= Ethen Beavers =

American comic book artist

- Area: Artist
- Notable works: Mutation; Justice League Unlimited; Star Wars: Clone Wars; Six

Ethen Beavers is an American comic book artist from Modesto, CA.

Beavers' comic industry work includes titles as Justice League Unlimited, Teen Titans Go!, Legion of Super Heroes in the 31st Century, Six, Noble Causes: Distant Relatives #4, as well as pin ups in Savage Dragon #112 and Hellhounds #3.

He has also done logo design as well as freelance illustration for various advertising agencies. Beavers worked as a storyboard artist for Warner Bros. Justice League Unlimited animated show on Cartoon Network. He illustrated the series N.E.R.D.S. by Michael Buckley and created comic art for George Lucas works such as Star Wars: Clone Wars Adventures and Indiana Jones.

== Mutation ==
In 2004, Beavers began working with writer George T. Singley on Mutation for Speakeasy Comics. Due to major complications with the now defunct Speakeasy Comics, neither writer nor artist received compensation for their work and the book was published months behind schedule. Several completed issues of the series were not published.

Mutation was picked up by Markosia and published (with the missing issues) in trade paperback format. Comics Bulletin commented on Beavers' work, stating:

Beavers is indeed a student of Kirby and the Bruce Timm stable of artists. Beavers captures Kirby's frenetic motion and truly dynamic anatomy so that Mutation seems to hit bad guys, all imaginatively designed, save for the opening Kalibak-clone, off the pages. The women have that highly stylized hourglass figure so prevalent in Batman: The Animated Series, Superman and to a lesser extent Justice League. The blustery nature of the fights and the painfully hot female background players are in fact very sly clues to the surprise conclusion.

== N.E.R.D.S. ==
In January 2009, author Michael Buckley walked into a Brooklyn New York comic shop to hand pick an illustrator for his new book series N.E.R.D.S. Buckley and creative director Chad Beckerman selected 10 candidates to submit to their editor as potential artists for the project. Out of that process, Beavers was selected as the illustrator for the N.E.R.D.S. book series. Four projects have been completed to date, N.E.R.D.S. (2009), M is for Mama's Boy (2010), The Cheerleaders of Doom (2011), and The Villain Virus (2012). Since the first installment, the N.E.R.D.S. series has gone on to become a New York Times best seller. Movie rights for the series were purchased by Elton John. Commenting about Beavers' illustrations in the N.E.R.D.S. series, Beckerman stated:

Again this [is] a series that I always wanted as a kid. Nerds that are superhero spies, sold! But what really sells me is Ethen Beavers' insanely amazing illustrations that cover this book to create the world of NERDS.

== Influences ==
Beavers' artistic influences include Jack Kirby, Darwyn Cooke, and Bruce Timm.

== Selected bibliography ==
- DC Comics
  - Justice League Unlimited #2, #7, #18
  - Legion of Super Heroes in the 31st Century #7, #9, #12, #18
- Image Comics
  - Six (written by Michael Avon Oeming)
- Speakeasy Comics
  - Mutation #1-3
- Markosia
  - Mutation Volume 1
- Dark Horse Comics
  - Star Wars: Clone Wars Adventures Volume 7
  - Indiana Jones Adventures Volume 1
  - Indiana Jones Adventures Volume 2
