= Puck (folklore) =

Fairy from English folklore

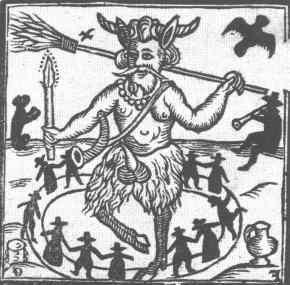
Illustration from the title page of Robin Goodfellow: His Mad Pranks and Merry Jests (1629)

In English folklore, The Puck (/ˈpʌk/), also known as Goodfellows, are demons or fairies which can be domestic sprites or nature sprites.

== Origins and comparative folklore ==
=== Etymology ===
The etymology of puck is uncertain. The present-day English word is attested already in Old English as puca (with a diminutive form pucel). Similar words are attested later in Old Norse (púki, with related forms including Old Swedish puke, Icelandic púki, and Frisian puk) but also in the Celtic languages (Welsh pwca, Cornish bucca and Irish púca). Most commentators think that the word was borrowed from one of these neighbouring north-west European languages into the others, but it is not certain in what direction the borrowing went, and all vectors have been proposed by scholars. The Oxford English Dictionary favoured a Scandinavian origin, while the scholarly study by Erin Sebo of Flinders University argues for an Irish origin, on the basis that the word is widely distributed in Irish place-names, whereas puck-place-names in English are rare and late in the areas showing Old Norse influence, and seem rather to radiate outwards from South West England, which she argues had Irish influence during the Early Middle Ages.

=== Alternative names ===
Puck may also be called The Goodfellows or Hobgoblin, in which Hob may substitute for Rob or Robin. This goes back to the character "Robin Goodfellow" and his name. The name Robin is Middle English in origin, deriving from Old French Robin, the pet form for the name Robert. Similar to the use of "the good folk" in describing fairies, it reflected a degree of wishful thinking and an attempt to appease the fairies, recognizing their fondness of flattery despite their mischievous nature.

The earliest reference to "Robin Goodfellow" cited by the Oxford English Dictionary is from 1531. Anthony Munday mentions Robin Goodfellow in his play The Two Italian Gentlemen, 1584, and he appears in Skialtheia, or a Shadowe of Truth in 1598. William Shakespeare may have had access to the manuscript of Lewes Lewkenor's translation of The Spanish Mandevile of Miracles, or, The Garden of Curious Flowers (1600), a translation of Antonio de Torquemada's Jardín de Flores Curiosas. The following passage from The Spanish Mandeville discusses the mischievous spirits:

Luduvico: I pray you let me somewhat understand your opinion as concerning Robingoodfellowes and Hobgoblins, which are said to be so common, that there is scarcely any man but will tell you one tale or other of them, of which for my own part, I believe none, but do make reckoning that every man forgeth herein, what pleaseth him.

Antonio: Many of them without doubt are forged, and many also true, for these kinds of Spirits are more familiar and domestical than the others, and for some causes to us unknown, abide in one place, more than in another, so that some never almost depart from some particular houses, as though they were their proper mansions, making in them sundry noises, rumours, mockeries, gawdes and jests, without doing any harm at all: and though I am not myself witness thereof, yet I have heard many persons of credit affirm that they have heard them play as it were on Gyterns & Jews Harps, and ring Bells, and that they answer to those that call them, and speak with certain signs, laughters and merry gestures, so that those of the house come at last to be so familiar and well acquainted with them that they fear them not at all. But in truth, as I said before, if they had free power to put in practice their malicious desire, we should find these pranks of theirs, not to be jests, but earnest indeed, tending to the destruction of both our body and soul, but as I told you before, this power of theirs is so restrained and tied, that they can pass no farther than to jests and gawdes: and if they do any harm or hurt at all, it is certain very little, as by experience we daily see.

After Giacomo Meyerbeer's successful opera Robert le Diable (1831), neo-medievalists and occultists began to apply the name Robin Goodfellow to the Devil, with appropriately extravagant imagery.

Bwbach or, diminutive, bwrbachyn, has also been used in Welsh Mythology.

== Characteristics ==
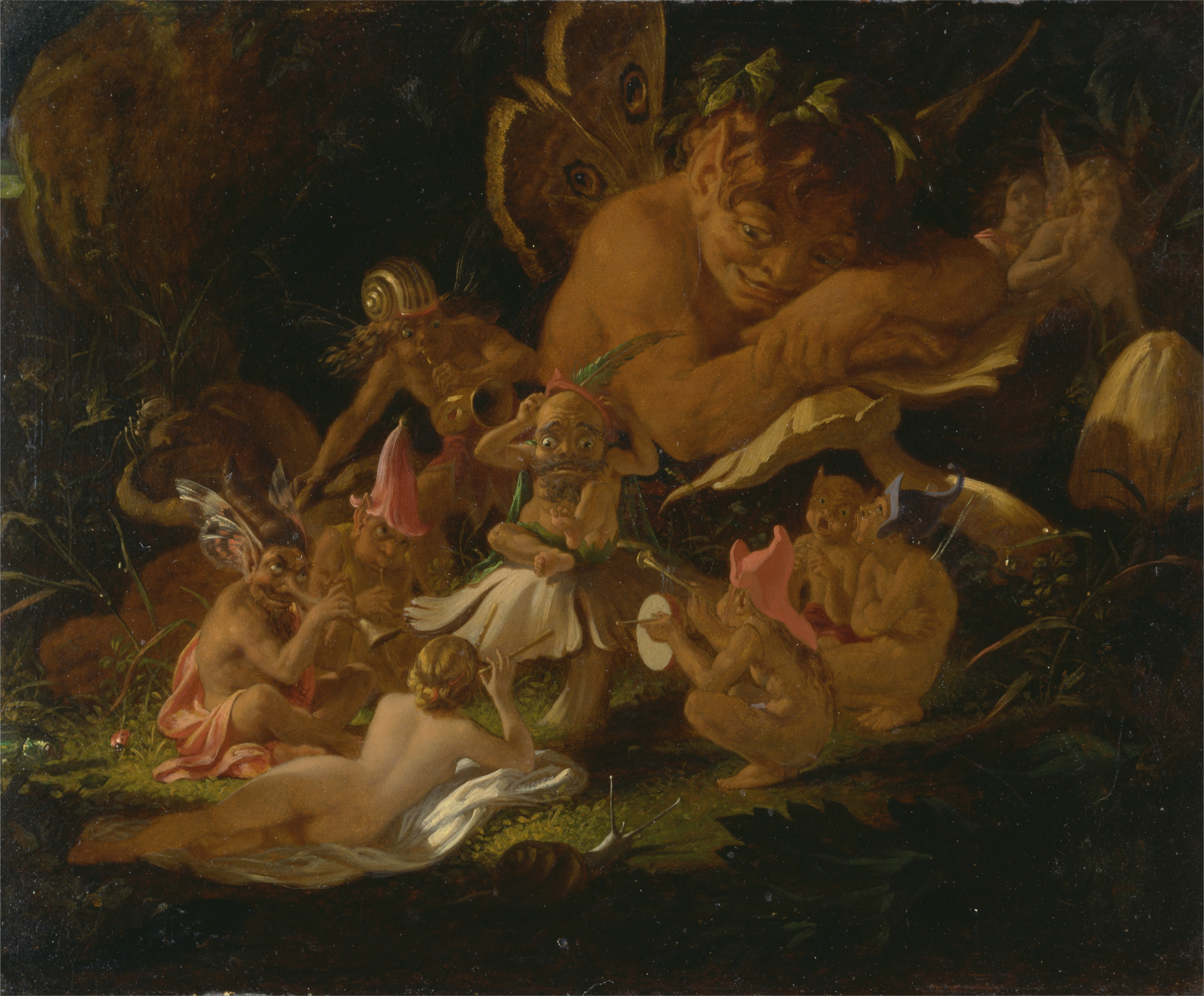
Joseph Noel Paton, Puck and Fairies, detail from A Midsummer Night's Dream.

According to Brewer's Dictionary of Phrase and Fable (1898):

[Robin Goodfellow is a] "drudging fiend", and merry domestic fairy, famous for mischievous pranks and practical jokes. At night-time he will sometimes do little services for the family over which he presides. The Scots call this domestic spirit a brownie; the Germans, Kobold or Knecht Ruprecht. Scandinavians called it Nissë God-dreng. Puck, the jester of Fairy-court, is the same.

Puck might do minor housework, quick fine needlework or butter-churning, which could be undone in a moment by his knavish tricks if displeased. A domestic spirit, he would assist housewives with their chores, in expectation of an offering of white bread and milk. If this were neglected he would steal that which he believed was owed.

Pucks are also known to be inherently solitary creatures. Shakespeare's characterization of "shrewd and knavish" Puck in A Midsummer Night's Dream may have revived flagging interest in Puck.

== Notable cultural references ==
This list excludes Shakespearean references. They may be found at Puck (A Midsummer Night's Dream).

=== 16th–17th century ===
- The character appears in Grim the Collier of Croydon (1660, but perhaps based on an earlier play).
- A Robin Goodfellow play was performed at Hampton Court on 1 January 1604, followed by The Masque of Indian and China Knights.
- An early 17th century broadside ballad The Mad Merry Pranks of Robin Goodfellow describes the character as the emissary of Oberon, the Fairy King of the Night, inspiring night-terrors in old women but also carding their wool while they sleep, leading travellers astray, taking the shape of animals, blowing out the candles to kiss the girls in the darkness, twitching off their bedclothes, or making them fall out of bed on the cold floor, tattling secrets, and changing babes in cradles with elflings.
- Robin Goodfellow is the main speaker in Jonson's 1612 masque Love Restored.
- John Milton, in L'Allegro tells "how the drudging Goblin swet / To earn his cream-bowle" by threshing a week's worth of grain in a night, and then, "Basks at the fire his hairy strength." Milton's Puck is not small and sprightly, but nearer to a Green Man or a hairy woodwose. An illustration of Robin Goodfellow from 1639 represents the influence of Pan imagery, giving Puck the hindquarters, cloven hooves and horns of a goat.

=== 19th century ===
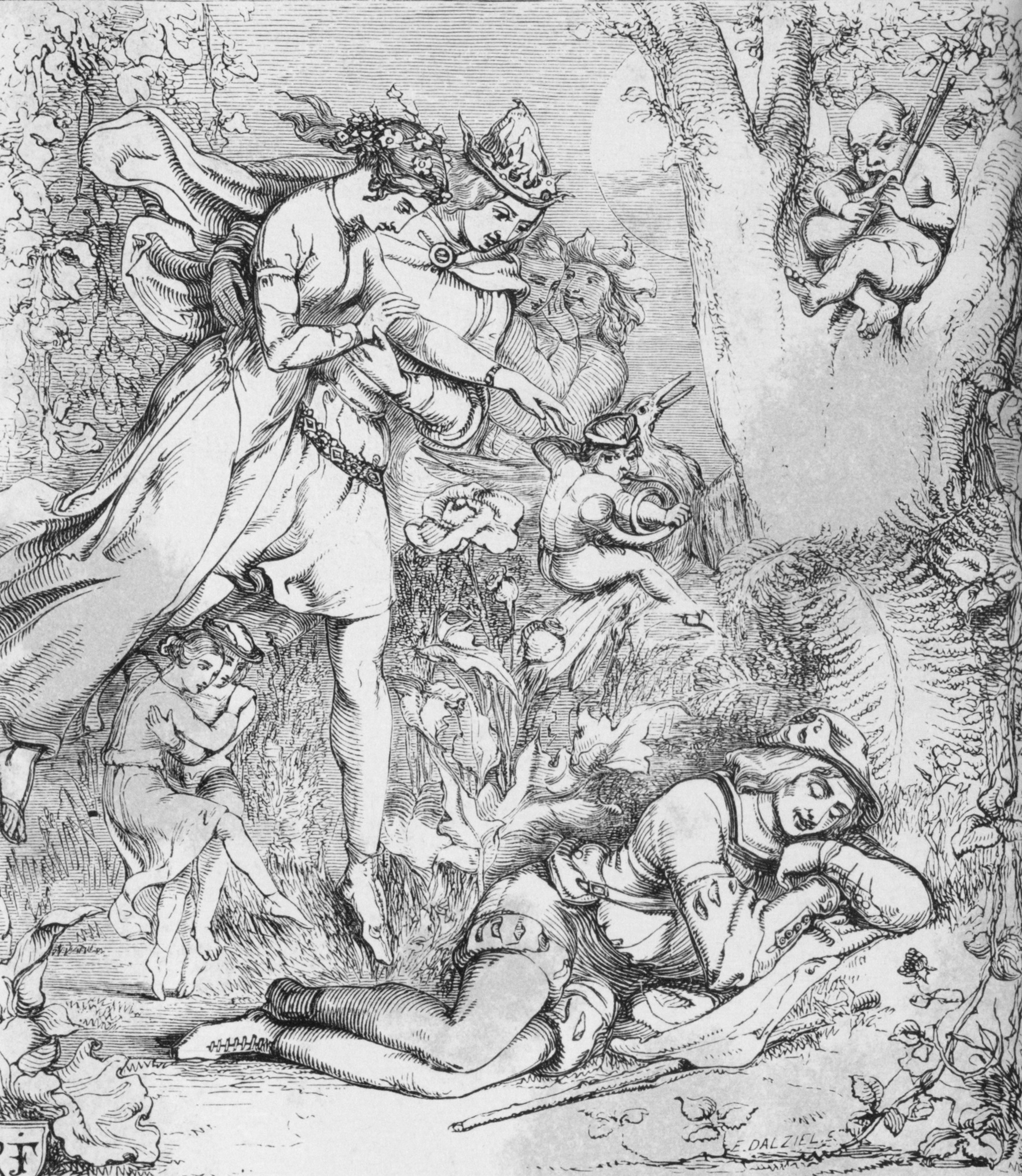
The Mad Pranks of Robin Goodfellow, by John Franklin, engraving by Edward Dalziel, 1845

- Robin Goodfellow appears in "The Mad Pranks of Robin Goodfellow", Gammer Gurton's Pleasant Stories of Patient Grissel, The Princess Rosetta, & Robin Goodfellow, and Ballads of the Beggar's Daughter, The Babes in the Wood, and Fair Rosamond, 1845.
- Robin Goodfellow appears in an 1856 speech by Karl Marx: "In the signs that bewilder the middle class, the aristocracy and the poor profits of regression, we recognize our brave friend Robin Goodfellow, the old mole that can work the earth so fast, that worthy pioneer – the Revolution."

=== 20th century ===
- The character of Puck frames the tales in Rudyard Kipling's short story cycles Puck of Pook's Hill (1906) and Rewards and Fairies (1910).
- Puck appears in Raymond E Feist’s ‘Faerie Tale’ (1988) as a more dark and sadistic devient.
- In the seinen manga Berserk by Kentaro Miura, the elf named Puck displays a propensity for mischief and sardonic humor. Physically he resembles a traditional fairy or sprite.
- The Sandman and The Sandman: The Kindly Ones by Neil Gaiman includes Puck as a significant character.
- There is a hero named Puck appearing in Marvel Comics' team Alpha Flight.

=== 21st century ===
- Puck is a major character in Michael Buckley's 2005–2012 book series The Sisters Grimm and its animated adaptation (2025).
- Puck (Robin Goodfellow) is a character in Rob Thurman's Cal Leandros series of novels (2006–).
- Puck appears in Diana Wynne Jones's novel Enchanted Glass (2010).
- Puck is a major character in Chris Adrian's 2011 novel The Great Night.
- In the 2019 Amazon series Carnival Row, the Puck are a race of fae.
- Puck (also known as Robin Goodfellow) joins the series Chilling Adventures of Sabrina in its third and fourth seasons (2019–2020) portrayed by Jonathan Whitesell.
- 'Robyn Goodfellowe' is a young English girl in the Irish animated feature Wolfwalkers (2020).
- Puck/Robin Goodfellow played by Jack Gleeson is a character in The Sandman season 2 (2025).
- Mimir from God of War 2018 and God of War: Ragnarok states that his original name before moving to the Nine Realms was 'Robin Goodfellow'

== See also ==
- Puck (A Midsummer Night's Dream)
- Puck (other uses)
- Niß Puk (also Nis Puk), a being from Danish-German folklore which also might be referred to as Puck
- Púca
- Bucca
- Portunes
