= Beowulf (disambiguation) =

Beowulf is an Old English epic poem.

Beowulf may also refer to:

== Arts and entertainment ==
=== Fictional characters ===
- Beowulf (hero), the main character of the poem
- Beowulf (DC Comics), a DC Comics character
- Beowulf (Dune), a character in the Dune book series
- Beowulf Shaeffer, a character in the works of Larry Niven in his Known Space universe
- Beowulf (Devil May Cry), a demon guardian in Devil May Cry 3: Dante's Awakening
- Beowulf, a playable character in the video game Skullgirls

=== Media ===
- Beowulf (1999 film), a science fiction fantasy action film
- Beowulf & Grendel, a 2005 film
- Beowulf (2007 film), an animated picture by Robert Zemeckis
  - Beowulf (soundtrack), the soundtrack album to 2007 film
  - Beowulf: The Game, a video game based on the 2007 film
- Beowulf: The Legend, a 2005 board game
- Beowulf: Return to the Shieldlands, a 2016 British TV series
- Beowülf, a 1980s thrash metal band based in Venice, California, US

== Other uses ==
- .50 Beowulf, a high-power round used mainly in modified AR-15 rifles
- Beowulf cluster, a high-performance computing cluster built from commodity hardware
- Beowulf Mining, a Sweden-focused exploratory mining company
- Operation Beowulf, two German plans to occupy the Moonsund archipelago during World War II
- SMS Beowulf, a German Siegfried-class coastal defense ship built around 1890

== See also ==
- List of artistic depictions of Beowulf
