= Beowulf (comics) =

Beowulf, in comics, may refer to:

- Beowulf (DC Comics), a DC Comics character and eponymous series origins
- Beowulf, a 1984 graphic novel, First Graphic Novel #1, from First Comics
- Beowulf, a 2005 series from Speakeasy Comics
- Beowulf, a 2006 series from Antarctic Press
- Beowulf, a 2007 mini-series, and film adaptation, from IDW Publishing
- Beowulf, a 2007 graphic from HarperCollins
- Beowulf: The Graphic Novel, a 2007 graphic novel from Markosia
- Gods of War, A 2016 Marvel series where Beowulf appears.

== See also ==
- List of artistic depictions of Beowulf § Comics
- Beowulf (disambiguation)
