= The Sisters Grimm (TV series) =

American animated streaming television series

- Promotional poster
- Genre: Adventure; Fantasy; Mystery
- Based on: The Sisters Grimm by Michael Buckley
- Developed by: Amy Higgins; Erica Rothschild
- Showrunner: Amy Higgins
- Directed by: Eden Riegel (voiceover director)
- Voices of: Ariel Winter; Leah Newman
- Composer: Leo Birenberg
- Country of origin: United States
- Original language: English
- No. of seasons: 2
- No. of episodes: 12

Production
- Executive producers: Amy Higgins; Elliot Blake; Philip Alberstat; Steven Amato; Theresa Park; Michael Buckley; Chris Prynoski; Shannon Prynoski; Ben Kalina; Antonio Canobbio
- Production companies: Titmouse, Inc.; Apple Studios

Original release
- Network: Apple TV+
- Release: October 3, 2025
- Network: Apple TV
- Release: October 2, 2026

The Sisters Grimm is an American animated television series based on Michael Buckley's novel of the same name. The first season premiered on October 3, 2025. The second season premiered on October 2, 2026.

== Premise ==
Two orphaned sisters navigate a town full of people torn straight from fantasy and fairy tales, confronting heroes and villains alike, while investigating the mystery of their missing parents.

== Cast and characters ==
=== Main ===
- Ariel Winter as Sabrina Grimm
- Leah Newman as Daphne Grimm

=== Supporting ===
- Laraine Newman as Relda Grimm
- Abubakar Salim as William Charming and Anansi
- Billy Harris as Puck
- JB Blanc as Canis, Seven, Principle Hamelin
- Kimberly Brooks as Ms. Smirt, Jailbird Granny, Princess Beauty, Briar Rose, the Queen of Hearts and Natalie
- Harry Trevaldwyn as the Magic Mirror
- Dylan Llewellyn as Jack the Giant Killer
- Keith Ferguson as Hamstead of the Three Pigs, Ichabod Crane, the Beast, and the White Rabbit
- Cia Court as Snow White, the Three Blind Mice and Bella
- Kestrel Riegel as Kelly
- Henry Watts as Jordy

== Episodes ==
=== Season 1 (2025) ===
No. overall	No. in season	Title	Directed by	Written by	Storyboard by	Original release date
1	1	"Relda"	Katie Aldworth	Erica Rothschild; Amy Higgins	MJ Barros; Gerald Kaye; Niki Yang	October 3, 2025
2	2	"Puck"	Hilary Florido	Story by : Erica Rothschild; Teleplay by : Amy Higgins	Joe Johnston; Jona Li; Christian Pincheira	October 3, 2025
3	3	"Jack"	Nathanael H Jones	Amy Higgins	Alex Nyerges; Mickey Quinn; Colin Shi	October 3, 2025
4	4	"Prince Charming"	Hilary Florido	Todd Casey	Joe Johnston; Jona Li; Christian Pincheira	October 3, 2025
5	5	"The Giant, Part 1"	Katie Aldworth	Bryan Caselli	MJ Barros; Gerald Kaye; Niki Yang	October 3, 2025
6	6	"The Giant, Part 2"	Nathanael H Jones; Liza Singer	Todd Casey; Amy Higgins	Alex Nyerges; Mickey Quinn; Colin Shi	October 3, 2025

=== Season 2 (2026) ===
No. overall	No. in season	Title	Directed by	Written by	Storyboard by	Original release date
7	1	"Bella"	Hilary Florido	Amy Higgins	Joe Johnston; Jona Li; Christian Pincheira	October 2, 2026
8	2	"Anansi"	Katie Aldworth	Bryan Caselli	MJ Barros; Gerald Kaye; Niki Yang	October 2, 2026
9	3	"Charlie"	Liza Singer; Nathanael H Jones	Michael Buckley	Alex Nyerges; Mickey Quinn; Colin Shi	October 2, 2026
10	4	"Wendell"	Hilary Florido	Brittany Jo Flores	Joe Johnston; Jona Li; Christian Pincheira	October 2, 2026
11	5	"The Pied Piper"	Katie Aldworth	Todd Casey	MJ Barros; Gerald Kaye; Niki Yang	October 2, 2026
12	6	"Rumpelstiltskin"	Nathanael H Jones	Amy Higgins	Alex Nyerges; Mickey Quinn; Colin Shi	October 2, 2026

== Production ==
=== Development ===
The Sisters Grimm author Michael Buckley originally conceived the concept for the book series as a pitch for a TV series, but decided to turn it into a book series instead at the encouragement of his friends. Following the books' success, Buckley received offers to adapt the books into a TV series, which he rejected due to the ideas suggesting changes he felt missed the books' "heart and soul". He ultimately agreed to adapt the series after meeting Amy Higgins, who he felt understood the source material.

A series based on the Sisters Grimm book series was first announced to be in development in May 2023. In August 2025, Amy Higgins was announced as the series' showrunner and executive producer alongside Buckley. Additional executive producers include Elliot Blake, Philip Alberstat, Steven Amato, Theresa Park, Chris Prynoski, Shannon Prynoski, Ben Kalina, and Antonio Canobbio, while Sage Cotugno serves s supervising director. Titmouse, Inc. was also announced as the series' production company. Erika Rothchild originally developed the series, before being replaced by Higgins during production; Rothchild received a co-developer credit in the series. In September 2025, Buckley said it was possible for the series to get renewed for a second season. 12 episodes were produced, released as the series' first two seasons.

=== Writing ===
In addition to executive-producing the series, Buckley serves as a writer alongside Higgins and story editor Todd Casey. Buckley said the series includes departures from the book that were decided according to what the writers' room felt were the best ideas for the series.

Higgins said she wanted the series to have an optimistic message, having started development shortly after the COVID-19 pandemic, with the series' main theme being that "you can help make your own story" as a reflection of that. The first season adapts the book series' first entry, The Fairy-tale Detectives.

=== Casting ===
In August 2025, the series' main cast was announced, with Ariel Winter and Leah Newman cast as the titular sisters, and Abubakar Salim, Billy Harris, and Harry Trevaldwyn starring in additional main roles.

=== Animation ===
The series' animation was produced by Titmouse, Inc, which made use of the Toon Boom software for the series; production for each episode of the series lasted over a year. Higgins wanted the animation to have a "storybook quality" through its use of colors and lighting, while also wanting characters such as Prince Charming to look like regular persons that expressed "these very human emotions".

== Release ==
The Sisters Grimm was released on Apple TV+ on October 3, 2025.

== Reception ==
On review aggregator Rotten Tomatoes, 100% of 5 critics gave the series a positive review.
