= Robot Comics =

Spanish comic book publishing company

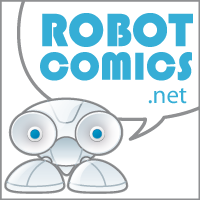
- Industry: Publishing
- Founded: 2009
- Founder: Hermes Pique
- Headquarters: Barcelona, Spain
- Products: Comics
- Website: Official website

Robot Comics is an independent publisher of mobile comics, founded in 2009 and based in Barcelona, Spain. It has published original mobile comics and adaptions for Android, iPhone, iPod Touch, Amazon Kindle and Nintendo DSi, many of them under a Creative Commons license.

== Titles ==
Their titles include:

- American Terror (by Jeff McComsey)
- Bear Beater Bunyan (by Josh Hechinger and Jorge Muñoz)
- Cory Doctorow's Futuristic Tales of the Here and Now (by Cory Doctorow and various, Creative Commons)
- Dracula's Guest (by Stephen L. Antczak, James C. Bassett, Steven Sanders)
- Erfworld (by Rob Balder and Jamie Noguchi, Creative Commons)
- ghostboy (by Jason James)
- Jesus Hates Zombies (by Stephen Lindsay and various)
- Light Apprentice Nate (by Igor Noronha)
- Misery Depot (by Hermes Pique and Juan Romera, Creative Commons)
- Phantom Jack (by Michael San Giacomo, Mitchell Breitweiser and various)
- Robot 13 (by Thomas Hall and Daniel Bradford)
- The Desert Peach (by Donna Barr)
- The Eternal City (by Sergio Carrera)
- Thunder Road (by Sean Demory and Steven Sanders)
- Ubunchu! (by Hiroshi Seo, Creative Commons)
- Valentine (by Alex de Campi and Christine Larsen, Creative Commons)

== Awards and nominations ==
- 2011: Publishing Innovation Award for Robot 13
