= Vito Delsante =

American comic book writer (born 1973)

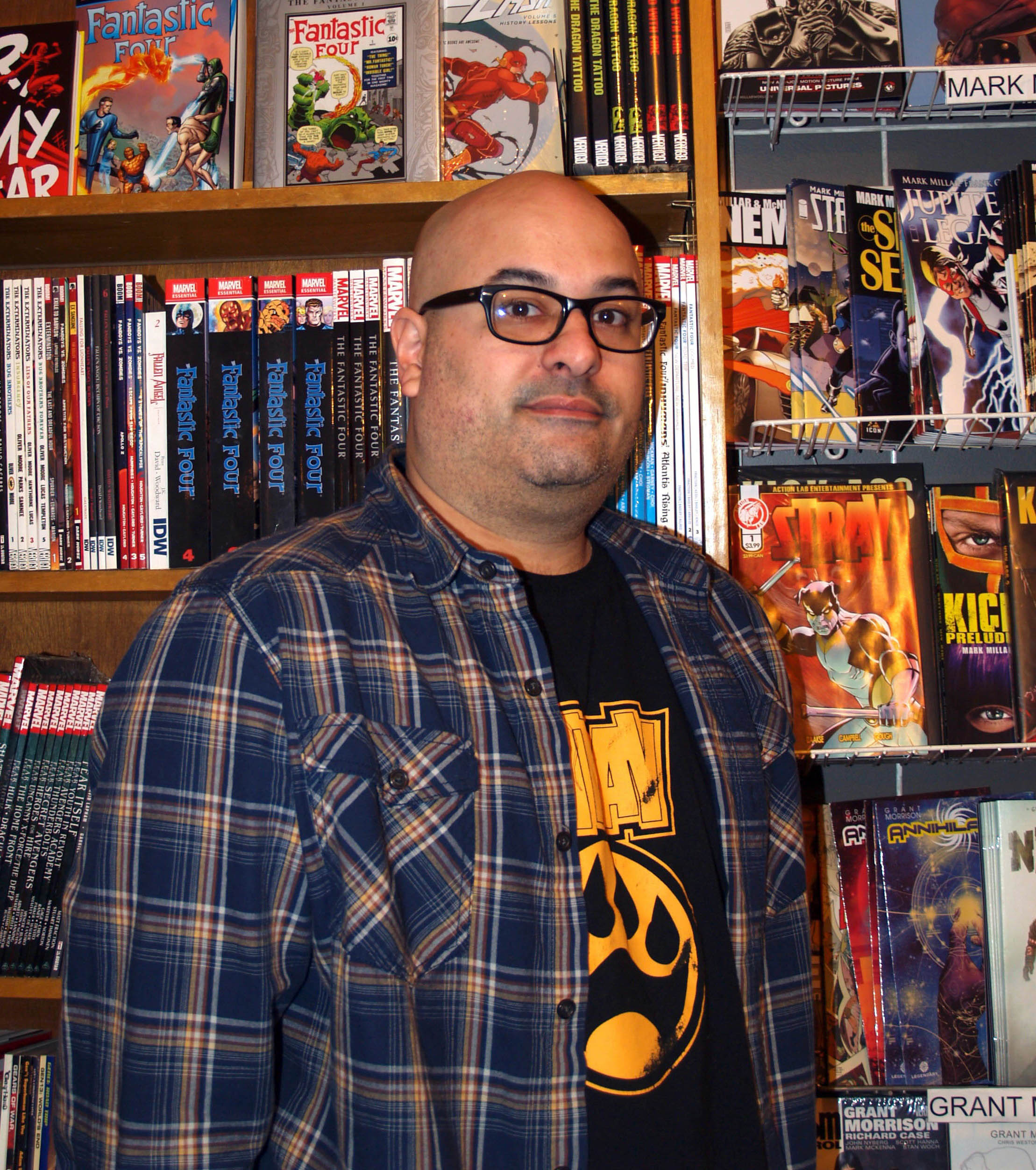
- Delsante at a 2015 signing for Stray #1 at JHU Comics in Manhattan.
- Born: 1973 (age 52–53) Staten Island, New York, U.S.
- Area: Writer

Vito Delsante (born 1973) is an American comic book writer, known for his work on characters such as Batman, Wolverine and Scooby-Doo.

== Early life ==
Vito Delsante was born in 1973 in Staten Island, New York, United States. He attended high school in Ford City, Pennsylvania, and the University of Pittsburgh. He now resides in Brooklyn, New York.

== Career ==
Delsante worked for the Canadian comics company Speakeasy Comics in a public relations capacity prior to their closing doors in the Spring of 2006, and was seen by some as the only public face in the company's final days. He was also a creator at Speakeasy, with part one of the six part series Fallout with Dean Haspiel printed as a back-up to Beowulf #7 before the series was cancelled as a result of the publisher's closing. With the closing of the publisher, the future for Fallout is uncertain.

His first major creator-owned title, The Mercury Chronicles with artist Mike Lilly, was rumored for publication in 2007.

In March 2006, Delsante began a weekly column called Random Shuffle on Comicon.com's comics news website The Pulse. He is a store manager at one of New York's largest comic book retailers, Jim Hanley's Universe.

In August 2006 The Chemistry Set, a webcomics collective of which Delsante is a member, launched. He produces the comic Stuck with Thomas Williams and is currently writing FCHS, a "semi-autobiographical look" at his high school days, with artist Rachel Freire.

In 2007, Delsante was slated to write a three-issue JSA Classified arc with artist Eric Wight. He has written a graphic novel for Simon & Schuster based on the childhood of Albert Einstein. The book, Before They Were Famous, was due out in July 2008. It never was published, but in February 2009, Aladdin published Delsante's biography of Babe Ruth, illustrated by Andrés Vera Martínez, part of the same Before They Were Famous series.

== Bibliography ==
- Batman Adventures #9 ("The Couch", with Dean Haspiel)
- X-Men Unlimited #5 ("Bar Stools", with Lee Ferguson)
- Reflux Comics #3 ("I Love Her Madly", with Michel Fiffe)
- in Beowulf #7 (backup "Fallout, Pt. 1", with Dean Haspiel)
- Scooby-Doo #109-110, 126, 128
- Stuck (The Chemistry Set, with Thomas Williams)
- Superman #676 (Originally Superman Confidential #9; later changed to #8; subsequently canceled by the publisher; now resolicited as stated.)
- Cartoon Network Block Party #42
- Savage Tales #'s 7 & 8
- The Mercury Chronicles #0 (with artist, Mike Lilly)
- FCHS (The Chemistry Set, with artist Rachel Freire)
- Before They Were Famous: Babe Ruth (with artist Andrés Vera Martínez, 2009)
- Twisted Savage Dragon Funnies in Savage Dragon #163, August 2010, with artist Rachel Freire.
