= Brodie's Law =

Brodie's Law may refer to:

- The Crimes Amendment (Bullying) Act 2011, a law in the Australian state of Victoria
- Brodie's Law (comics), a comic book series
