= Grimoire (disambiguation) =

A grimoire is a textbook of magic.

Grimoire may also refer to:

- Grimoire, a collection of packages or "spells" in the Source Mage operating system
- Grimoire: Heralds of the Winged Exemplar, a 2017 video game
- The Grimoire, a Canadian comic book series
- The Grimoire (Shadowrun), a 1990 role-playing game supplement
- Detective Grimoire, a video game series and its titular protagonist
- Harry Grimoire, the protagonist of the television series Darkstalkers
