= The Eternal City =

The Eternal City may refer to:

== Cities referred to as such ==
- Eternal City in Samarkand
- The city of Rome
- The city of Jerusalem (referred to as "the eternal capital")
- The city of Kyoto, Japan, specifically the historical Heian-kyō, dubbed Yorozuyo no Miya (万代宮, "The Eternal City")

== Popular culture ==
=== Films ===
- The Eternal City (1915 film), a film based on the 1901 novel
- The Eternal City (1923 film), 1923 lost film directed by George Fitzmaurice based on the novel
- The Eternal City (2008 film), a 2008 film
- My Spy: The Eternal City, a 2024 film

=== Other ===
- The Eternal City, a 1901 novel by Hall Caine
- The Eternal City, a 2009 comic by Sergio Carrera published by Robot Comics
