= Bayou Arcana =

Graphic novel anthology

- First edition
- Author: Various male writers, various female artists
- Language: English
- Genre: Horror fiction, Southern Gothic
- Publisher: Markosia
- Publication date: 2012
- Publication place: United Kingdom
- Media type: Print (hardback & paperback)
- Pages: 128
- ISBN: 978-1-905692-75-0

Bayou Arcana: Songs of Loss and Redemption is a graphic novel anthology of 11 stories created by a team of male writers and female artists, first published in 2012. It draws heavily on the United States' 'Southern Gothic' tradition of mysticism in both the storytelling themes and visual art. Much of the stories' content is also related to cultural issues of oppression and retribution in the context of the history of the Southern United States.

== Stories ==
- The Tale of Ol' Mercy - story: Jimmy Pearson, art: Valia Kapadai (10 pages)
- Comfort and Joy - story: Darren Ellis, art: Davina Unwin (11 pages)
- Irons in the Fire - story: Corey Brotherson, art: Jennie Gyllblad (11 pages)
- True Reflections - story: Steve Tanner, art: Alex Thompson (10 pages)
- Tohopoka - story: Alexi Conman, art: Vicky Stonebridge (12 pages)
- Promises - story: Matt Gibbs, art: Sara Dunkerton (6 pages)
- Small World - story: Matthew Craig, art: Dani Abram (14 pages)
- Grinder Blues - story: Jimmy Pearson, art: Lynsey Hutchinson (11 pages)
- Swamp Pussy and the Hanged Man – story: Cy Dethan, art: Nic Wilkinson (12 pages)
- Six Bullets - story: Jimmy Pearson, art: Patricia Echavarri-Riego (12 pages)
- The 'Skeeter - story: Jimmy Pearson, art: Jenny Clements (12 pages)

== Themes ==
Bayou Arcana is an attempt to increase gender equality in the comic industry. According to The Guardian "the anthology is the product an experiment that brings together an all-female team of artists with an all-male team of writers and it is an illustration of how a new generation of female artists and readers is radically changing the face of comics".

Five of the artists and three of the writers attended the Kapow 2012 comic convention as members of an interview panel which has been commented on by the press as another positive step for women in the comic industry.
