= Strangeways (comics) =

Publication information
- Publisher: Highway 62 Press
- Format: Graphic novel
- Genre: Weird Western, horror, science fiction
- Publication date: 2008–present
- No. of issues: Serialized online

Creative team
- Created by: Matt Maxwell

Matt Maxwell at the 2026 World Fantasy Convention

Strangeways is a weird western/Western comic book miniseries created and written by Matt Maxwell. Published in a graphic novel format instead of single issues, it is currently appearing in a serial version at Comic Book Resources.

The story is set in the Western United States after the end of the Civil War but before the closing of the frontier. It is an example of Weird West fiction, combining elements of horror (especially werewolves) and science fiction within a Western setting.

== Publication history ==
Originally solicited for publication by Speakeasy Comics in 2005, Strangeways was pulled from their schedule by the author when it became clear that Speakeasy's financial troubles would shut the company down before completion of even the first story arc. Resolicited by Highway 62 Press, the first Strangeways graphic novel, Strangeways: Murder Moon (ISBN 978-0-9796957-0-4) was published in 2008.

The second story Strangeways: The Thirsty was serialized at Blog@Newsarama.com and then at Robot6 at Comic Book Resources.

== See also ==
- High Moon
- Dead Irons
