= Gatesville Company =

Gatesville Company was an ongoing comic book series created by writer Marc Bryant and artist Patrick McEvoy. A supernatural drama composed of self-contained issues, it started publication in July 2005 from Speakeasy Comics. Two issues were published before Speakeasy went out of business.

== Bibliography and synopses ==
- Gatesville Company #1: Gatesville is a ghost town, where the souls of killers go to meet their last trial before they move on to their afterlife. The souls are from all over the world, in every era of history. Gatesville is their final chance to slay their dragons.
- Gatesville Company #2: A professional interrogator, skilled in the art of torture comes to town for her final session, but her subject may give her more answers than she ever bargained for.
