= List of adaptations of Beowulf =

Beowulf is an Old English heroic epic poem of anonymous authorship. Its creation dates from between the 8th and the 11th century, the only surviving manuscript dating from circa 1010. At 3182 lines, it is notable for its length. Since the 18th century, when modern scholarship about the poem was established, Icelandic, Danish, Scandinavian, German, and English scholars have all suggested the poem as a national epic for their respective languages.

Beowulf has been adapted many times in verse, in prose, on the stage, visual works, and in film. In 2003, the Arizona Center for Medieval and Renaissance Studies published Marijane Osborn's annotated list of over 300 translations and adaptations, withdrawn in 2019. By 2020, the Beowulf's Afterlives Bibliographic Database listed some 688 translations and other versions of the poem, from Thorkelin's 1787 transcription of the text, and in languages including Afrikaans, Albanian, Arabic, Basque, Belarusian, Catalan, Chinese, Czech, Danish, Dutch, English, Estonian, French, Ganda, German, Greek, Gujarati, Hungarian, Icelandic, Italian, Japanese, Korean, Latvian, Macedonian, Persian, Portuguese, Polish, Punjabi, Russian, Serbo-Croat, Slovenian, Somali, Spanish, Swedish, Tamil, Turkish, Uighur, and Urdu.

The poet John Dryden's categories of translation have influenced how scholars discuss variation between translations and adaptations. In the Preface to Ovid's Epistles (1680) Dryden proposed three different types of translation:

metaphrase [...] or turning an author word for word, and line by line, from one language into another; paraphrase [...] or translation with latitude, where the author is kept in view by the translator so as never to be lost, but his words are not so strictly followed as his sense, and that, too, is admitted to be amplified but not altered; and imitation [...] where the translator – if he has not lost that name – assumes the liberty not only to vary from the words and sense, but to forsake them both as he sees occasion; and taking only some general hints from the original, to run division on the ground-work, as he pleases.

The works listed below are novels and other works that take more "latitude" than pure "translations". Those are listed at List of translations of Beowulf.

== Novels based on Beowulf ==
=== Novels and short stories ===
- 1949: Silverlock, a novel by John Myers Myers. In one scene the protagonist attends the celebration in Heorot after Beowulf kills Grendel. Beowulf only appears in this scene, but he has a profound effect on the motivations of the protagonist.
- 1958: The Ring-givers, a novel by W. H. Canaway. It is historical novel based closely on the poem.
- 1961: As a children's story by Rosemary Sutcliff.
- 1966: in The Green Man, a novel by Henry Treece, Beowulf is a minor character, who travels with his own bard, who is making the story about him.
- 1968: Beowulf: A New Telling, an adaptation for children by Robert Nye.
- 1971: Grendel, the Beowulf story is retold from Grendel's point of view in this novel by John Gardner.
- 1976: Eaters of the Dead: The Beowulf story, in combination with a fictionalized 10th century Arabic narrative of Ahmad ibn Fadlan created by the author Michael Crichton, was used as the basis for this novel. This story is portrayed in the movie The 13th Warrior.
- 1987: The Heorot series: science-fiction novels, by Steven Barnes, Jerry Pournelle, and Larry Niven, is named after the stronghold of King Hrothgar and partly parallels Beowulf.
- 1996: Whose Song is Sung, a novel by Frank Schaefer. The narrative is told from the point of view of a dwarf named Musculus, who becomes an advisor to Emperor Heraclius in the last days of the Roman Empire. Eventually, he makes his way north and becomes a traveling companion to Beowulf.
- 1998: Bay Wolf: a poem by Neil Gaiman which retells the Beowulf story and appears in Smoke and Mirrors.
- 1999: Beowulf, an illustrated version by Kevin Crossley-Holland and Charles Keeping.
- 2006: The Monarch of the Glen, a novella Neil Gaiman published in his anthology Fragile Things involves "modernized Beowulf characters."
- 2007: As a tie-in with the Beowulf film by Robert Zemeckis, a novelization of the film by Caitlin R. Kiernan was published in September of that year.
- 2008: The Saga of Beowulf, a novel by R. Scot Johns.
- 2009: Grendel's Mother, a novel by Ralph Bourne.
- 2009: Beowulf, an adaptation for children by Rob Lloyd Jones.
- 2013: Beowulf, an adaptation for children by Michael Morpurgo, with illustrations by Michael Foreman.
- 2015: Grendel's Mother: The Saga of the Wyrd-Wife, a novel by Susan Signe Morrison, portrays Grendel's Mother as being human, washed upon the shores of Denmark, with the character representing an integration between the old ways of the Scandinavian/Germanic tribes, and early Christianity. This novel has won a number of awards.
- 2016: Grendel's Mother, a novel by Diana Stout.
- 2018: The Mere Wife, a novel by Maria Dahvana Headley, retells the story from the point of view of Grendel's Mother, set in contemporary, suburban America.
- 2020: Beowulf, an illustrated adaptation for children by Nick Holt and John Howe
- 2022: Grendel's Mother, a novel in verse, by Jane Gardner.
- 2023: Shield Maiden, a novel, by Sharon Emmerichs, that reconsiders the Beowulf story from the perspective of King Beowulf's niece, Fryda, who was injured during childhood, but is now coming into her own power just in time—Guests are come to celebrate his 50-year reign which bring more than gifts & good-tidings to celebrate, & which only she may be able to overcome.
- 2023: Beowulf: In a Free Modern Retelling, by Ethan Mordden.

=== Graphic novels and comics ===
M J Weller's Beowulf Cartoon, (Writers Forum/Visual Associations, 2004).

- 1975–1976: Beowulf Dragon Slayer, published by DC comics and edited by Dennis O'Neil, written by Michael Uslan and primarily illustrated by Ricardo Villamonte. Later, Beowulf appears in Wonder Woman #20 (2008).
- Issue #49 of the Animaniacs comic book featured a Pinky and the Brain story featuring Brain as Brainwulf, who, accompanied by Pinknarf (Pinky), attempts to defeat Grendel so that he can take over Denmark afterwards.
- 1999–2000:The Collected Beowulf: by Gareth Hinds & Leslie Siddeley.
- Beowulf by Gareth Hinds, Published by TheComic.com (2000) and Candlewick Press (2007). A faithful adaptation with historically detailed, fully painted illustrations.
- 2005: Speakeasy Comics: this series debuted a Beowulf monthly title featuring the character having survived into the modern era and now working alongside law enforcement in New York City to handle superpowered beings.
- 2006: Antarctic Press ran a manga adaptation of the Beowulf legend, written and drawn by David Hutchison.
- 2007: Beowulf: The Graphic Novel by Stephen L. Stern and Christopher Steininger, released by AAM/Markosia.
- Beowulf Cartoon: Bookwork by Michael J. Weller with introduction by Bill Griffiths.
- Biowulf by David Hutchinson. "A cyberpunk adaptation of the classic tale of Beowulf." Published by Antarctic Press in 2007.
- 2007, Neil Gaiman and Roger Avary, a graphic novel version of their screenplay of the Beowulf film, published by IDW Publishing.
- 2008: Kid Beowulf, by Alexis E. Fajardo. A series of eight graphic novels, that depict the characters of Beowulf in the years leading up to the epic poem. Published by Bowler Hat Comics
- 2008: Beowulf: Monster Slayer, by Paul D. Storrie and Ron Randall.
- Stephen Notley's weekly strip Bob the Angry Flower ran a 10-part series entitled Rothgar. Bob attempted to take the place of Beowulf, using modern technology to help Hroðgar defeat Grendel; the ancient epic changed when Grendel was revealed as a sympathetic character.
- 2013: Beowulf by Santiago Garcia and David Rubín, published in English in 2017 by Image Comics.
- 2023: Bea Wolf, by Zach Weinersmith; illustrated by Boulet. "A modern middle-grade graphic novel retelling of Beowulf, featuring a gang of troublemaking kids who must defend their tree house from a fun-hating adult who can instantly turn children into grown-ups." Published by First Second Books.
- 2024: García and Rubín's version was republished, including 22 pages of an unfinished earlier album by García illustrated by Javier Olivares.

== Music ==
- 1925: The Lament for Beowulf, op. 25, by American composer Howard Hanson. Large-scale work for chorus and orchestra. Translation by W. Morris and A. Wyatt.
- 1982: Grendel, a song by Marillion, B side to their first single, "Market Square Heroes". The recorded version of the song is 17:40 long, while the live versions regularly ran to over 20 minutes.
- 1994: Grendel's Mother, a song by The Mountain Goats from their debut studio album "Zopilote Machine". The song is written from the point of view of Grendel's mother lamenting her son's death at the hands of Beowulf.
- 2000: Beowulf: A Suite for Ancient Instruments, by American composer John Craton. A multi-movement work depicting the life and exploits of Beowulf, scored for ancient instruments. The composer also created a version for modern orchestra in 2005.
- 2009: Beowulf: Scyld's Burial, by composer Ezequiel Viñao. For SATB and percussion quartet. Translation by E. Viñao.
- 2010: Beowulf by historyteachers. Set to the tune of "99 Luftballoons" by Nena

== Opera and theatre ==
- 1974: Beowulf: A Musical Epic: a rock opera by Victor Davies (music) and Betty Jane Wylie (libretto), with Chad Allen as Beowulf.
- 1984: Beowulf: adapted for live performance by the founding members of Theatre in the Ground.
- 1990s Beowulf one-man shows in modern English by Julian Glover
- 1993. Beowulf, op. 17, chamber opera (or dramatic cantata) in one act for a chorus of young voices, light soprano, light tenor and baritone soli, by Richard Lambert.
- 2005: Beowulf: rock opera composed by Lenny Picket, lyrics by Lenny Pickett and Lindsey Turner, produced October–November 2005 by the Irish Repertory Theatre, directed by Charlotte Moore
- 2006: Grendel: an opera composed by Elliot Goldenthal, directed by Julie Taymor, and commissioned by Los Angeles Opera; it was given its world premiere at the Dorothy Chandler Pavilion on 8 June 2006, with bass Eric Owens starring in the title role.
- 2007: Beowulf: The Heart Off Guard Theatre Company produced a musical adaptation for children of the Beowulf story at the Edinburgh Fringe. Directed by Guy Jones with a score by Michael Betteridge.
- 2007: Beowulf, a DVD release of a performance of Beowulf by Benjamin Bagby in the original Old English
- 2008: Beowulf – A Thousand Years of Baggage: a SongPlay by Banana Bag & Bodice. Text by Jason Craig, Music by Dave Malloy
- 2016: Beowulf. An adaptation for chamber opera. Libretto and music by Hannah Lash. Commissioned by Guerilla Opera and premiered in May 2016.
- 2016: Beowulf, an opera commissioned by Cantata Dramatica, composed by Louis Mander, with libretto by Nick Pitts-Tucker.
- 2017: Beowulf, a one-person musical adaptation by Chris Thorpe, produced for the Unicorn Theatre, London, with all roles played by Debbie Korley.
- 2019: 'Beowulf (and the Bard)" by Vidas Barzdukas and Christopher R. Bartlett. A comedic play that updates the Old English poem and turns Beowulf into an out-of-shape prince hoping to fulfill the heroic code who travels with a bard struggling with a nasty case of writer's block. Published by Dramatic Publishing.
- 2024: Beowulf the Musical, a musical theatre adaptation by Umay Acar-Sümer performed at the Edinburgh Fringe Festival.

== Cinema and television adaptations ==
- 1981: Grendel Grendel Grendel, an animated film based on the novel Grendel by John Gardner which tells the story of Beowulf from Grendel's perspective.
- 1995: "Heroes and Demons", an episode of Star Trek: Voyager. The central plot revolves around a fictional virtual reality adaption of Beowulf taken over by a lifeform accidentally trapped on Voyager.
- 1998: Animated Epics: Beowulf, featuring the voices of Derek Jacobi, Joseph Fiennes and Michael Sheen.
- 1999: Beowulf, a science-fiction/fantasy film starring Christopher Lambert.
- 1999: The 13th Warrior, action movie directed by John McTiernan mixing Beowulf with the travels of Ibn Fadlan; based on Crichton's Eaters of the Dead.
- 2005: Beowulf & Grendel, starring Gerard Butler and directed by the Icelandic-Canadian Sturla Gunnarsson.
- 2007: Grendel, a made-for television movie on the Sci Fi Channel (United States).
- 2007: Beowulf, an animated film directed by Robert Zemeckis starring Ray Winstone and created through motion capture. The manuscript was written by Roger Avary and Neil Gaiman. It deviates significantly from the original poem, most notably by making the dragon fought in the finale the offspring of Beowulf and Grendel's mother, whom he did not slay.
- 2007: Beowulf: Prince of the Geats
- 2008: Outlander, a science fiction film starring James Caviezel.
- 2016: Beowulf: Return to the Shieldlands, an ITV adaptation – starring Kieran Bew as Beowulf.

== Games ==
=== Board games ===
- Beowulf: The Legend is a board game by Reiner Knizia with artwork by John Howe, based on the events of Beowulf.

=== Video games ===
- Beowulf: Viking Warrior: action adventure game based on the original story, by 4HEAD Studios; cancelled after Ubisoft announced Beowulf: The Game
- Beowulf: The Game: action adventure game based on the 2007 film, developed by Ubisoft coming for PC, PS3, Xbox 360 and PSP.
- Grendel's Cave: a MUD role playing fantasy game based on the original story.
