= N.E.R.D.S. =

Children's book series by Michael Buckley

- Cover of the first book NERDS: National Espionage, Rescue, and Defense Society
- National Espionage, Rescue, and Defense Society; M is for Mama's Boy; The Cheerleaders of Doom; The Villain Virus; Attack of the Bullies
- Author: Michael Buckley
- Illustrator: Ethen Beavers
- Country: United States
- Language: English
- Genre: Children, spy, adventure
- Publisher: Amulet Books
- Published: 2009–2013
- Media type: Print (hardcover and paperback)

N.E.R.D.S. is a children's spy pentalogy written by Michael Buckley and illustrated by Ethen Beavers. The series tells the story of a fictional spy agency and its agents—children who have their "nerdy" characteristics upgraded into a tool that they can use to fight crime. The series includes five books, each told from a different agent's perspective. The series lasted from 2009 to 2013. As of 2022, an animated show based on the series is in development with Lisa Zusmer DelPrete, DelZus Productions LLC.

== Overview ==
The book series centers around National Espionage, Rescue, and Defense Society, or N.E.R.D.S., a spy agency that contains children with considerably "nerdy" upgrades. It is mentioned that all N.E.R.D.S. are automatically retired when they turn eighteen, which is the legal consent age for adults. The headquarters is located in Arlington, Virginia in Nathan Hale Elementary in the first three books and Thomas Knowlton Middle School in the last two books.

== Books ==
1. N.E.R.D.S.: National Espionage, Rescue, and Defense Society (2009)
2. N.E.R.D.S.: M is for Mama's Boy (2010)
3. N.E.R.D.S.: The Cheerleaders of Doom (2011)
4. N.E.R.D.S.: The Villain Virus (2012)
5. N.E.R.D.S.: Attack of the B.U.L.L.I.E.S. (2013)

== Characters ==
=== Current agents ===
- Jackson "Braceface" Jones - A formerly popular football star who's the protagonist of the first book. He comes off as cocky and arrogant, but is actually very insecure and craves acceptance. His upgrades have enhanced his braces, allowing them to transform into any gadget he can think of, the downside being they stay attached to his teeth the entire time. There also seems to be a mutual attraction between him and Mindy "The Hyena".
- Duncan "Gluestick" Dewey - A chubby African-American boy who is friendly to most people and is the protagonist of the second book. His main trait is that he loves eating paste, a habit that started after he was dared into drinking a jar of paste in art class. His upgrades have enhanced the paste he loves to eat, enabling him to stick to any surface, and shoot glue from his hands. He is shown to love technology, even using it in his family.
- Matilda "Wheezer" Choi - A spunky Korean-American tomboy with a unibrow who's the protagonist of the third book. She suffers from bronchial asthma and cannot even walk around the block without getting winded; as such, her upgrades are two nano-enhanced inhalers that enable her to fly and blast enemies, along with blowtorches. During the third book she received two other inhalers, one to increase her jumping height while using stealth, the other to allow her to breathe underwater. She is also proficient in fighting, as she loves professional wrestling and can use anything as a weapon. She has a small crush on her teammate Gluestick.
- Julio "Flinch" Escala - A hyperactive Mexican-American boy who's the protagonist of the fourth book. Described as a walking ball of energy spiked by the large numbers of sugary items he consumes everyday, his upgrade is a special harness that converts his hyperactive energy into superhuman speed and strength; without the harness he is visibly shaking non-stop. His catchphrase is "I am mighty!" and usually following this he is banging his fists on his chest.
- Ruby "Pufferfish" Peet - A stubborn but smart Jewish girl who is the protagonist of the last book. She suffers from a wide variety of allergies; as such her upgrades have enhanced her allergies to the point where they border on psychic abilities, allowing her to detect danger, dishonesty, etc. She is the current leader of the team.

=== Other agents ===
- Agent Alexander Brand - Known as one of the best secret agents in the world and the leader of the N.E.R.D.S. Brand has a fake job as a janitor to cover up being a N.E.R.D.S. Member. He has a white cane because of an injury from a mission that left him partially crippled. He often doubts that the team can do the job right and has threatened to disband the team several times, however he is ultimately proud of the team. He had a romantic relationship with his assistant Ms. Holiday. He quit the team by the end of the fourth book after Ms. Holiday was revealed to be a spy, but was subsequently reinstated by Pufferfish during the climax of the fifth book.
- The Lunch Lady - A man disguised as a lunch lady who flies the N.E.R.D.S. rocket/jet, dubbed "The School Bus." He is extremely loyal to the N.E.R.D.S., going as far as to lock himself up when he believed he was being affected by the Villain Virus. He became the de facto leader of the group at the start of the fifth book.
- Benjamin - A blue floating orb that is the N.E.R.D.S. supercomputer. He takes on the holographic form of Benjamin Franklin, one of the world's earliest spies. He is the one who gives the N.E.R.D.S. their upgrades and briefs them on missions.
- Mindy "The Hyena" Beauchamp - A former junior beauty pageant queen, and skilled martial artist who wanted to become a professional assassin. She works for N.E.R.D.S. on a currently classified project and is the leader of the Troublemakers, a group of boys who formerly bullied Flinch. She does not have an upgrade, but she naturally possesses an obnoxious laugh that causes anyone that hears it to laugh as well. She seems to have a romantic interest in Braceface.
- Gerdie "Mathlete"/"Lilly" Baker a former member of N.E.R.D.S. and a prodigy at math. Her upgrades allow her to process complex problems at lightning speed. In the third book she was able to create a machine that takes her to other worlds for ten minutes, which she uses to her advantage. She then helped Heathcliff travel to a different dimension, where he proceeded to trap her after receiving new upgrades. After this, she started working with that dimension's Benjamin to save that Earth's population from aliens.

=== Antagonists ===
- Heathcliff "Choppers/Simon/Screwball/Brainstorm" Hodges - A very intelligent but frequently bullied boy who is the main antagonist of the series. His upgrade in the first two books is a specially designed psycho-hallucinogenic whitening treatment which is further enhanced by a special toothpaste that allows him to hypnotize people with his buck teeth. He betrays the group at the end of the first book, stating that he wants to rule a world where knowledge and learning is important stemming from a hatred for bullies and the years of humiliation that he suffered under Jackson, who formerly bullied him when he was still popular. He is eventually defeated, but he continued to cause trouble for the team throughout the series. His two front teeth were knocked out in the second book; however, in an alternate dimension he was able to receive new upgrades which increased the size of his brain and skull, affording him psychokinetic powers including telekinesis and heat vision. He used this upgrade to disable the N.E.R.D.'s upgrades saved for Wheezer, who proceeded to knock him unconscious. After Flinch disabled his upgrades, which had created a virus that corrupted people, Heathcliff woke up with amnesia, and was subsequently reinstated to the team even though he later regained his memory (abandoning his goals of world domination). His final upgrade was never officially revealed, although it is implied that it helped his parents remember him after the agents removed Heathcliff from their memories.
- Ms. Lisa Holiday/Miss Information/Viktoriya Deprankova - The librarian at Nathan Hale Elementary who was Agent Brand's assistant and the main antagonist of the fifth book. She is known to bake awful-tasting cookies for the children, and is surprisingly useful for combat. In The Villain Virus she was the only person who remained evil after the virus was destroyed. It was later revealed that she was actually a spy from Siberia named Viktoriya Deprankova. She became the leader of the B.U.L.L.I.E.S. and traveled back in time to destroy the N.E.R.D.S. once and for all, but was stopped by Agent Brand, Pufferfish, and Heathcliff, who fixed the corrupted timeline and changed Ms. Holiday back into an ally.
- Dr. Jigsaw - A mad scientist who was the main antagonist of the first book. He wished to recreate Pangaea because he believed it would help create unity, and he worked together with Simon to create a tractor beam. At the end of the book, he was killed as his lair fell apart.
- Dumb Vinci/The Antagonist - A goon who worked for Dr. Jigsaw and Simon. He lost his hand in the first book and had it replaced with a hook. In the third book, he is sprayed with poison in the face by a giant grasshopper, severely damaging his face; as a result, after he was corrupted by the Villain Virus, he dons a mask and calls himself "The Antagonist".
- Albert Nesbitt/Captain Justice/Captain Upgrade - A 37-year-old overweight computer genius who is solely interested in comic books and superheroes. He becomes one of Simon's minions in the second book, and received upgrades that gave him new powers by adapting technology implanted into his body. He was eventually defeated by Gluestick, who overloaded his brain.
- Gertrude "Mama" Nesbitt - Albert's 67-year-old mother who encourages him to become a scientist despite his comic book addiction. Whenever he became a villain, she went with the idea, and tried to help him by nearly killing Duncan when she rammed her car into him. She fell from a rocket at the end of the second book and was presumably killed.

=== Other characters ===
- General Savage - A general described as a hulk of muscle who had fought in 14 wars, starting ten of them just to stay in shape. He was the one who introduced Agent Brand to the N.E.R.D.S.
- Principal Dehaven - The Nathan Hale Elementary principal who dislikes Braceface because of his delinquency.
- Ms. Dove - The former principle of Thomas Knowltown Middle School who took a disliking to Flinch, who she classified as a juvenile delinquent and tried to expel. She became infected with the Villain Virus and called herself Colonel Cuckoo. At the end of the epidemic, she returned to normal and was ironically transferred to another school in Siberia.
- Brett Bealer - A popular kid who was formerly one of Jackson's best friends. His betrayal helped introduce Jackson to the N.E.R.D.S.
- Dr. Lunich - A brave athlete and scientist. He stood up to Dr. Jigsaw when he was creating a superweapon, but Dr. Jigsaw killed him by making him fall into a fire pit. Dr. Lunich also made a tractor beam that Dr. Jigsaw was very interested in.

== Plot synopses ==
=== N.E.R.D.S.: National Espionage, Rescue, and Defense Society (2009) ===
Dr. Jigsaw and Simon or Heathcliff "Choppers" hatches a plot to change the surface of the earth. Newly recruited Jackson "Braceface" and the rest of the N.E.R.D.S. have to stop him before it is too late.

=== N.E.R.D.S.: M is for Mama's Boy (2010) ===
Duncan "Gluestick " Dewey and the rest of the team are going up against rogue agent Heathcliff "Choppers" Hodges, computer genius Albert, and an army of squirrels who are planning to sterilize worldwide computers. Things get more complicated when the team are stripped of their powers and have to rely on their resources to save the day.

=== N.E.R.D.S.: The Cheerleaders of Doom (2011) ===
When a device that can warp through alternate dimensions is built by cheerleader and former N.E.R.D.S. member Gerdie "Mathlete" Baker, Matilda "Wheezer" Choi, who has a hatred for anything girly must set that aside to infiltrate a cheerleading camp and root out Gerdie before worlds collide. In the end, Gerdie gets trapped in the multiverse when Heathcliff tries to take over the world.

=== N.E.R.D.S.: The Villain Virus (2012) ===
A deadly virus that turns people into villains spreads through Arlington, and Julio "Flinch" Escala, who is immune, must lead the team into stopping the virus while former goon Dumb Vinci has an agenda of his own. A virus is spread around the country and normal people are going berserk.

=== N.E.R.D.S.: Attack of the Bullies (2013) ===
Miss Holiday, who is now the evil Miss Information, has assembled her own team of kids with their own super nanobyte upgrades, naming them the Brotherhood of Unstoppable Liars, Lowlifes, and Intimidating Enemies of Society (aka the B.U.L.L.I.E.S.), who plan to go back in time and prevent N.E.R.D.S. from ever existing. Ruby "Pufferfish" Peet's teammates begin to vanish one by one, and she enlists Agent Brand and Heathcliff Hodges to go back to the 1970s and help the original nerdy secret agents make sure that the future is not erased from existence.

== Film ==
In January 2012 it was reported that Elton John's Rocket Pictures had acquired film rights to the series, to produce an animated family feature film. The film will be scripted by the series' creator, Michael Buckley, produced by Steve Hamilton Shaw and David Furnish, and executively produced by Elton John. As of 2024, however, there are no updates reported for the film.
