= Frank Espinosa =

American animator and cartoonist

- Areas: cartoonist, animator, contemporary artist
- Notable works: Rocketo

Frank Espinosa is an American animator and cartoonist. He has worked extensively for Disney and Warner Bros., having redesigned the Looney Tunes characters in 1992, fashioned a series of Looney Tunes U.S. postage stamps, and designed the Baby Looney Tunes characters, among other achievements.

In 2005–2006, Espinosa produced the comic book Rocketo, published by Speakeasy Comics and Image Comics. Espinosa's art can also be seen in a two-part back-up feature starring the Living Totem by writer Zeb Wells in Doc Samson (Marvel Comics) #4–5 (April–May 2006). In 2007, Espinosa drew the first two issues of the Image Comics series Killing Girl.

Espinosa began teaching Character and World Design as part of the Comparative Media Studies program at the Massachusetts Institute of Technology in fall 2006.

Espinosa was nominated for three 2006 Eisner Awards: Best New Series (Rocketo), Best Continuing Series (Rocketo), and Best Cover Artist.
