= Rocketo =

2006 comic book series by Frank Espinosa

- Art from the cover to Rocketo #1

Publication information
- Publisher: Speakeasy Comics; Image Comics
- Format: Ongoing series
- Genre: Science fiction
- Publication date: July 2005 – Sept. 2006
- No. of issues: 12
- Main character: Rocketo Garrison

Creative team
- Created by: Frank Espinosa
- Written by: Frank Espinosa, Marie Taylor
- Artist: Frank Espinosa

Rocketo is a comic book series by Frank Espinosa. Initially published by Speakeasy Comics, in 2006 Rocketo moved to Image Comics. Espinosa handled nearly every aspect of Rocketo's production (writing, art, color, lettering), with Marie Taylor credited as co-writer.

Rocketo follows the life and adventures of Rocketo Garrison, world-famous explorer and mapmaker. Set 2,000 years into a mythical future, the world has been destroyed in a catastrophe and its magnetic field is distorted. The only way for mankind to now navigate through the broken land masses is by the unique abilities of the Mappers, a genetically engineered group of men and women who act as human compasses.

Frank Espinosa was nominated for three 2006 Eisner Awards, for Best New Series (Rocketo), Best Continuing Series (Rocketo), and Best Cover Artist.

== Publication history ==
As a comic book series, Rocketo was initially planned to last 48 issues, with each twelve-issue series making up one book. There were four books planned:

- Book 1 - "Journey to the Hidden Sea"
- Book 2 - "Journey to the New World"
- Book 3 - "Journey to the Broken Moon"
- Book 4 - "Journey to Ultamo"

Ultimately, the series lasted 12 issues before ending in 2006.

=== Issues ===
- Rocketo #0 (Speakeasy Comics - July 2005), "The Siren's Call": The comic features an artwork by Frank Espinosa and "lyrics" by Marie Taylor. Issue #0 introduces Rocketo Garrison as a young boy on the Island of Kova where he lives with his mother and father, a maker of the specialized equipment the explorers use and a renowned Mapper himself. One day as Rocketo reads about the fabled land of Ultamo and the role it played in the world's destruction, the young boy is profoundly changed and his lifelong adventure as a Mapper begins.
- Rocketo #1 (Speakeasy Comics - August 2005), "Prosperity" ("Journey to the Hidden Sea" - part 1): When a living storm known as the Omerylla Coil devastates the Island of Kova, young Rocketo Garrison is saved by the Commonwealth. He is taken to live with Horace Voltea, an old Mapper of great renown, and under his guidance, Rocketo taps into the power of the Mappers for the first time. As time passes Rocketo grows up and explores the world, beginning his career as a Mapper and becoming friends with Spiro Turnstile, a genetic man. When a war breaks out between the Commonwealth and the Royalists, Rocketo is captured, imprisoned and tortured. When finally released he is a broken man and takes up residence at an abandoned lighthouse, Porto Logas.
- Rocketo #2 (Speakeasy Comics - September 2005), "Conflicts" ("Journey to the Hidden Sea" part 2): When a living storm known as the Omerylla Coil devastates the Island of Kova, young Rocketo Garrison is saved by the Commonwealth. He is taken to live with Horace Voltea, an old Mapper of great renown, and under his guidance, Rocketo taps into the power of the Mappers for the first time.
- Rocketo #3 (Speakeasy Comics - October 2005), "Departures" ("Journey to the Hidden Sea" part 3): At the end of the Solarium War, Rocketo Garrison is a broken man and his mapping abilities are useless. He takes a lowly job at Perdition's Point lighthouse but his lonely, self-imposed exile ends when former partner, Spiro Turnstile, suddenly appears. Spiro has the inside track on a rare treasure thought to be in The Hidden Sea, but unbeknownst to him, Spiro has been followed by members of The Hand, a secret criminal syndicate he has betrayed. A citywide chase through Sansebo ends when Rocketo is thrown unconscious into the Great Atlas Ocean.
- Rocketo #4 (Speakeasy Comics - December 2005), "Directions" ("Journey to the Hidden Sea" part 4): Rocketo Garrison wakes up on board a ship to discover he has been kidnapped by a band of treasure hunters led by Spiro Turnstile. When they later encounter the mighty King of the Atlas Ocean, they are given advice on how to navigate the Hidden Sea. Meanwhile, Jordan Scarletto has been called to a private audience with a Prince of Lucerne and given a top secret mission that can, if successful, change the balance of power in the New World. Finally, Spiro, Rocketo and the band of adventurers enter mysterious of Venedicto, travel down the River of Totems and are attacked by the hideous Harpies, creatures who patrol the access to the Hidden Sea.
- Rocketo #5 (Image Comics - March 2006), "Passages" ("Journey to the Hidden Seas" part 5): Not published as a monthly but is included in the TPB titled "Journey to the Hidden Seas" volume 1, published by Image comics in March 2006. Rocketo Garrison has been kidnapped by a band of treasure hunters led by Spiro Turnstile. Gordon Scarletto has a private audience with a Prince of Lucerne and is given a top secret mission that can change the world's balance of power. Spiro, Rocketo and the band of adventurers enter Venedicto and are attacked by hideous creatures.
- Rocketo #6 (Image Comics - March 2006), "Tempests" ("Journey to the Hidden Seas" part 6): Not published as a monthly but is included in the TPB titled "Journey to the Hidden Seas" volume 1, published by Image comics in March 2006. Scarletto leads a mutiny against the Prince of Lucerne triggering a ferocious storm in the Hidden Sea. Caught in the storm, Rocketo, Spiro and the crew battle against the sea creatures who have been unleashed. Violence rocks the Hidden Sea leaving a wake of broken ships and battered bodies hoping for rescue.
- Rocketo: Journey to the Hidden Seas - Volume 1 (Image Comics - March 2006): Published by Image comics in March 2006, it collects "Journey to the Hidden Seas" issues #1-6. It includes a large amount of extra material such as sketches, notes, pin-ups, and an introduction by renowned artist Alex Ross.
- Rocketo #7 (Image Comics - April 2006), "Reunions" ("Journey to the Hidden Seas" part 7): After surviving a crash landing in the Hidden Sea, Rocketo begins searching for his doomed crew only to encounter Gordon Scarletto. Later, a beautiful young woman holds the key to some astounding revelations.
- Rocketo #8 (Image Comics - May 2006), "Revelations" ("Journey to the Hidden Seas" part 8): After Rocketo is reunited with his crew, a mythical figure appears to reveal the true history of the Old World and the story of the Hidden Sea. Meanwhile, the villainous Scarletto finds the deadly Robot and makes his plans.
- Rocketo #9 (Image Comics - June 2006), "Resolutions" ("Journey to the Hidden Seas" part 9): Rocketo Garrison and the rest of the Hidden Sea expedition has just learned the true origins of the Hidden Sea, and the New World. They must prepare for war as Scarletto launches his attack on the Hidden city of the Mappers.
- Rocketo #10 (Image Comics - July 2006), "Conquests" ("Journey to the Hidden Seas" part 10): The fight for the future of the Hidden Sea begins, which also includes a conflict between Birdmen against Giant Robots. Rocketo and his team of explorers must once again do battle with the forces of Lucerne. As the giant army of Scarletto takes over the city in the Hidden Sea, Rocketo's life hangs in the balance.
- Rocketo #11 (Image Comics - August 2006), "Illumination" ("Journey to the Hidden Seas" part 11): The battle for the city deep within the Hidden Sea has ended with Scarletto in full control. The Royal Navy of Lucerne has crossed the Hidden Sea and is now poised to find the flower of mankind. Rocketo Garrison, beaten and half dead, must find the power within himself to ignite that which was lost.
- Rocketo #12 (Image Comics - October 2006), "Journeys" ("Journey to the Hidden Seas" part 12): In his race against time Rocketo must call on the deadly forces that killed his parents to rescue his friends from Scarletto. He confronts the gigantic Lucernean Armada that threatens all life in the Hidden Sea. As this epic comes to an end, the New World beckons Rocketo to further adventures.
