= Markosia =

British comic book publishing company

Markosia Enterprises Ltd
- Industry: Publishing
- Founded: 2005
- Founder: Harry Markos
- Area served: United Kingdom
- Key people: Harry Markos (publisher); Ian Sharman (editor-in-chief)
- Products: Comics
- Website: http://www.markosia.com/

Markosia is a British comic book publishing company.

== History ==
Markosia was founded by Harry Markos in 2004. He employed Richard Emms (previously of APC) as the editor-in-chief as well as lead designer. In 2005, Markosia had already published Harry Gallan's The Lexian Chronicles novel and the initial plan was to produce comic adaptations of novels, such as The Lexian Chronicles and G. P. Taylor's Shadowmancer. They subsequently secured the license to adapt Starship Troopers, leading to a broadening in the business plan. This would further expand when Markosia brought Chuck Satterlee on board as director of operations.

Satterlee moved over from Speakeasy Comics after their troubles in 2006 and he assisted in bringing over a number of titles with him, giving Markosia a range of original comic titles. These included The Hunger by creators Jose Torres and Chris Dibari and Chimaera Studios's with their eight titles.

In 2007 Markosia re-branded themselves for the comics Direct Market by merging with AAM (Associated Arts and Media) to form AAM Markosia.

In 2008 the company signed a number of properties such as The Boy Who Made Silence, Ritual, N-Guard, Serpent Wars and Eagle Award nominated anthology title Eleventh Hour.

== Publications ==
- Abiding Perdition (by Nick Schley and Pedro Delgado)
- Alpha Gods:
  - Alpha Gods: Emergence (by Ian Sharman and Ezequiel Pineda)
  - Alpha Gods: Betrayal (by Ian Sharman and Ezequiel Pineda)
  - Alpha Gods: Revelation (by Ian Sharman and JJ Alonso)
  - Alpha Gods: Omnibus (by Ian Sharman, Ezequiel Pineda and JJ Alonso)
- Anabasis (adapted from Xenophon by Petri Hiltunen)
- Beowulf (by Steve Stern and Chris Steininger)
- The Boy Who Made Silence (by Joshua Hagler)
- Breathe (by John Sheridan and Kit Wallis)
- Brodie's Law (by Alan Grant, David Bircham and Daley Osiyemi, issue #7 onwards and a trade paperback, August 2006, ISBN 0-9550082-0-4)
- Brothers - The Fall of Lucifer (by Tony Lee and Wendy Alec/Sam Hart)
- Chrono-Cat (by Stu Perrins and Armando Zanker)
- 'Chrono-Cat:There And Back Again!' (by Stu Perrins, Joe Covas and Ron Gravelle'
- Cosmic Debris (by Stu Perrins and John E. Murphy)
- Dark Mists (by Annika Eade and Lee Garbett, Markosia, 2005)
- Dryland Book One (2016) by Con Chrisoulis ISBN 978-1909276932
- Done to Death (by Andrew Foley and Fiona Staples, 5-issue miniseries, 2006)
- Eleventh Hour (anthology edited by Ian Sharman)
- The Hand of Glory (by Mark Bertolini and numerous artists), pulp anthology
- Hero: 9 to 5:
  - Hero: 9 to 5 (by Ian Sharman and David Gray)
  - Hero: 9 to 5 - Quietus (by Ian Sharman and David Gray)
  - Hero: 9 to 5 - Disposable Heroes (by Ian Sharman and David Gray)
- Hero Killer (by Tony McDougall and Martinho Abreu)
- Hollow Girl (by Luke Cooper)
- Hypergirl (by Ian Sharman and David Wynne)
- The Intergalactic Adventures Of Zakk Ridley (by Ian Sharman, Pete Rogers and Ewan McLaughlin)
- Kate and William: A Very Public Love Story (written by Rich Johnston, 60 pages, April 2011, ISBN 1-905692-45-5) collects:
  - William Windsor: A Very Public Prince (with art by Gary Erskine, 36 pages, April 2011, ISBN 1-905692-44-7)
  - Kate Middleton: A Very Private Princess (with art by Mike Collins, 36 pages, April 2011, ISBN 1-905692-43-9)
- Knowledge (by Mark Bertolini and Jerome Eyquem)
- Kong: King of Skull Island (by Joe DeVito, Andy Briggs, Chuck Satterlee, Dan O'Connor and Scott Larson)
- The Lady & The Lost World (by Ian Sharman, Hakan Aydın and Loles Romero)
- The Last Magician (by Sean Meighen and Thien Uncage)
- The Lexian Chronicles (by Harry Gallan with art by Inaki Miranda and Ryan Stegman)
- Long Gone (by Mark Bertolini, Ted Pogo, OGN)
- Megatomic Battle Rabbit (by Stu Perrins and Israel Huertas)
- Midnight Kiss (by Tony Lee and Ryan Stegman/Kieran Oats, 5-issue miniseries)
- Mutation (by George T. Singley and Ethen Beavers)
- N-Guard (by Jon Bryans and Philip Jackson)
- Of Bitter Souls (by Chuck Satterlee and Norm Breyfogle)
- Project Eon (by Brett Thompson, Freddie Williams II and Shawn McGuan)
- Pumpernickel (by Luke Cooper)
- Return Of The Son Of Eleventh Hour (anthology edited by Ian Sharman)
- Reya (by Morag and Sergei Lewis)
- Ritual (by Andy Briggs and Shawn McCauley)
- Scatterbrain (by Brendan Deneen and Szymon Kudranski)
- Serpent Wars (by Christian Rodríguez, Chris Campanozzi and Antonio Rojo)
- Seven Tales from King Arthur's Court by Edmund Dulac and John Erskine and editor Albert Seligman
- Shadowmancer (by Tony Lee and G. P. Taylor/Pedro Delgado, 10-issue adaptation)
- Silent Ghost (by George T. Singley, Thien Do and Brett Weldele)
- Smoke & Mirror (by Chuck Satterlee)
- SPIRALMIND:Pavane Mentis (by Benito F Perez & Matthew Rothblatt)
- Starship Troopers:
  - Blaze of Glory (by Tony Lee and Sam Hart, previously published through Mongoose Publishing)
  - Dead Man's Hand (by Tony Lee and Neil Edwards)
  - Damaged Justice (by Tony Lee and Shanth Enjeti)
  - Starship Troopers: Ongoing Series: Marooned #1-4 (by Tony Lee and Chris DiBari)
  - Starship Troopers: Ongoing Series: Bad Blood #5-8 (by Cy Dethan and Paul Green)
  - Starship Troopers: Ongoing Series: Triple Threat #9-10 (by Cy Dethan, Tony Lee, Christian Beranek - stories and Scott James, Jim Boswell, Neil Edwards - art)
  - Starship Troopers: Ongoing Series: Fool's Errand #11-14 (by Cy Dethan and Diego Simone)
  - Starship Troopers: Ongoing Series: War Stories - Vandals One Shots (by Cy Dethan and various)
- The Tizzle Sisters (by Tony Lee and G. P. Taylor, Dan Boultwood, graphic novel/prose hybrid, October 2006)
- The Flying Friar (by Rich Johnston and Thomas Nachlik)
- The Hill (by Sal Cipriano and Jok)
- Hope Falls (by Tony Lee and Dan Boultwood, 5-issue miniseries)
- Jazan Wild's Carnival of Souls (by Jazan Wild, Stefan Petrucha, and Kevin Conrad)
- Haven (by Leonardo Ramirez, ongoing series)
- Serpent Wars (by Christian Rodriguez and Chris Campanozzi/Antonio Rojo, graphic novel)
- The Dark (by Chris Lynch and Rick Lundeen, 4-issue miniseries)
- Cancertown: An Inconvenient Tooth (by Cy Dethan and Stephen Downey, 6-issue miniseries)
- The Indifference Engine: A Holographic Novel (by Cy Dethan and Rob Carey, 4-issue miniseries)
- The Great God Pan (adapted by Adam Fyda from the novel of Arthur Machen, graphic novel)
- Slaughterman's Creed (by Cy Dethan and Stephen Downey, 5-issue miniseries)
- Bayou Arcana (by various male writers and various female artists, graphic anthology)
- Urban Legends (by Steven Stone and various artists, graphic novel anthology)
- Voyaga (by Brandon Barrows, Ionic and Rudolf Montemayor, graphic novel, ISBN 978-1-905692-86-6, October 2012)
- Dark Lies, Darker Truths (by Dino Caruso and Sami Kivelä, graphic novel, ISBN 978-1-905692-88-0, October 2012)
- Words On A Wall (by Ian Sharman)
