= Speakeasy Comics =

Defunct Canadian comics and graphic novel publisher

- Status: Defunct
- Founded: 2004
- Founder: Adam Fortier
- Defunct: 2006
- Country of origin: Canada
- Headquarters location: Toronto, Ontario
- Publication types: Comics
- Official website: speakeasycomics.com

Speakeasy Comics was a Canadian publishing company of comic books and graphic novels which operated from 2004–2006. Based in Toronto, Ontario, Speakeasy published monthly comics, creator-owned independent series, original graphic novels, and collected out-of-print creator-owned comics series that had originated with other companies. Its best-known titles were Atomika, Beowulf, The Grimoire, and Rocketo.

Although Speakeasy made a big public relation splash and announced a large lineup of monthly titles, it had trouble almost from the beginning in following through with its plans. Warren Ellis characterized the short-lived company as "one publisher getting it wrong from start to finish: releasing too many books, without a support structure, releasing comics without a dedicated marketing plan".

== History ==
=== Beginnings ===
Adam Fortier founded Speakeasy Comics in August 2004. Previously, Fortier had worked for comics publishers Dreamwave Productions (where he revived the Transformers licence in comics), Devil's Due Publishing, UDON, and IDW Publishing.

In March 2005, the company published its first titles, the debut issues of Atomika and The Grimoire.

In a sign of trouble to come, however, that same month, Yoshitaka Amano's Hero, a highly anticipated graphic novel, was cancelled and postponed one year. The novel was eventually published by Boom! Studios in November 2006. In 2005, creator Frank Espinosa moved his Rocketo series to Image Comics.

In November 2005, Speakeasy concluded a financing deal with Los Angeles-based Ardustry Entertainment. The agreement included that Speakeasy would develop comics based on licenses brought by Ardustry, while Ardustry would represent Speakeasy's comics properties in the entertainment industry (films, videogames, etc.)

=== Troubles ===
Also in November 2005, Speakeasy-owned titles Beowulf, The Grimoire, and Spellgame went through several creative team changes. In that same period, only a few months after signing with the publisher, Atomika creator Sal Abbinanti split from Speakeasy to self-publish future issues Atomika under his own Mercury Comics label.

In December 2005, Speakeasy canceled orders on two months' of previously ordered comics. Creator allegations of non-payment and mismanagement of projects started circulating.

Speakeasy published no titles in January 2006. That month, creator Sal Cipriano cancelled Bio Boy series, but was keeping The Hill there. Creator Matt Maxwell left Speakeasy for his Strangeways series. Four issues had been solicited but never published.

Also in January, Chimaera Studios began moving their eight series — Mutation, Of Bitter Souls, Super Crazy TNT Blast (renamed Twilight Men), Smoke & Mirror, Lonebow, Wargod, Project Eon, and Silent Ghost — from Speakeasy to the British publisher Markosia. Creators Jose Torres and Chris Dibari were also moving their series The Hunger to Markosia.

In addition, Jonathan Martin's Speakeasy Comics Archive (a blog dedicated to Speakeasy-related news) was shut down, presumably under "trademark infringement" litigation.

The following month, creators of the series O.C.T. - the Occult Crimes Taskforce moved their title to Image Comics.

=== Closure ===
At the end of February 2006, Vito Delsante, Speakeasy's "unofficial" public relations director, announced via email the immediate closure of Speakeasy, with all March-solicited books still shipping, April and May's being tentative, and June's being cancelled. The company, however, did not file for bankruptcy, officially in order to try to pay its outstanding bills.

Comics reporter Tom Spurgeon characterized the company's demise this way: "... right now you have to have sustainable capital, publishing skill, marketing ability, something some people want, and enough perspective to let those factors and not personal ambition define the enterprise. I didn't see any of that with Speakeasy...."

It was later revealed (according to Ardustry Entertainment's business affairs manager, Wayne Williams) that the November 2005 deal between Speakeasy and Ardustry had only been an option to buy Speakeasy, which expired without materialization. Cash-flow problems led to Speakeasy's demise before they could materialize various potentially lucrative licensing deals, such as with HBO (The Sopranos and Deadwood).

Speakeasy intended to collect some series in trade paperbacks (such as Atomika, Grimoire, and Beowulf), but all solicited TPBs were eventually cancelled. In March 2006, only Beowulf #7 was published. In May 2006, Diamond Comic Distributors's monthly list of cancelled comics listed all the remaining unpublished Speakeasy comics, with the terminal cancel code 10 ("Supplier Out of Business").

== Publications ==
=== Monthly titles ===
- Athena Voltaire: Flight of the Falcon #1 (2006) — moved to APE Entertainment
- Atomika #1-4 (2005) — moved to Mercury Comics
- Beowulf #1–7 (2005–2006)
- The Adventures of Bio Boy #1–2 (2005)
- Butternutsquash #1 (Nov. 2005) — webcomic planned for quarterly publication
- Death Valley (2005) by Scott O. Brown and Horacio Lalia
- Elk's Run #4 — creator-owned series
- Gatesville Company #1-2 (2005)
- The Grimoire #1-7
- Helios: In With the New #1-2
- Hero@Large #1-2 (2005)
- The Hunger #1–5 (2005) — moved to Markosia
- Lonebow #1 (2005) — moved to Markosia
- Mutation #1–3 (2005) — moved to Markosia
- Of Bitter Souls #1–3 (2005) — moved to Markosia
- Rocketo #1–6 (2005–2006) — moved to Image Comics
- Seasons of the Reaper #1 (2005)
- Shotgun Wedding #1 (2005)
- Smoke & Mirror #1–2 (2005) — moved to Markosia
- Spellgame #1-3
- Super Crazy TNT Blast #1 (2005) — moved to Markosia as Twilight Men
- Wargod #1 (2005) — moved to Markosia

==== Cancelled/debuted with other publishers ====
- Hero by Yoshitaka Amano — TPB published by Boom! Studios in 2006
- The Hill by Sal Cipriano and Jok — TPB published by Markosia in 2006
- O.C.T.: Occult Crimes Taskforce – #1–4 published by 12 Gauge Comics and Image in 2006
- Phantom Jack: The Nowhere Man Agenda — TPB published by IDW Publishing in 2010
- Project Eon — #1–3 published by Markosia in 2006
- Silent Ghost — #1–2 published by Markosia in 2006
- Superunknown
- Strangeways — TPB published by Highway 62 Press in 2008

=== Graphic novels/graphic novellas ===
- The Flying Friar (2005) by Rich Johnston
- The Living And The Dead (2005) by Todd Livingston and Robert Tinnell
- Parting Ways: the Near Life Experiences of Peter Orbach (2005) by Andrew Foley
- Ravenous (2005) by Dawn Brown

=== Collections ===
- 2020 Visions — collects #1–12 previously serialized at DC/Vertigo
- Elk's Run Bumper Edition — collects #1–3 previously self-published
- Phantom Jack - The Collected Edition — collects #1–5 previously serialized at Image Comics

== Circulation ==
Based on pre-order sales through Diamond Comic Distributors reported by industry resource site ICv2, Speakeasy's top-selling monthly comics during its period of operation were:

- (2005.03) 7,756 copies (rank 190) for Atomika #1
- (2005.04) 6,116 copies (rank 187) for Atomika #2
- (2005.05) 3,305 copies (rank 213) for Grimoire #3
- (2005.06) 5,726 copies (rank 231) for Atomika #3
- (2005.07) 3,717 copies (rank 208) for Beowulf #3
- (2005.08) 6,381 copies (rank 203) for Atomika #4
- (2005.09) 2,019 copies (rank 251) for Smoke & Mirror #1
- (2005.10) 2,946 copies (rank 250) for The Grimoire #6
- (2005.11) 3,130 copies (rank 248) for Beowulf #5
- (2005.12) 2,463 copies (rank 273) for The Grimoire #7
- (2006.01) -- no comics published this month
- (2006.02) 2,718 copies (rank 246) for Beowulf #6
- (2006.03) -- one issue published but not ranked in Top 300 (i.e. less than 2,632 copies)
- (2006.04) -- no comics published this month
- (2006.05) -- no comics published this month
