= The Grimoire =

Publication information
- Publisher: Speakeasy Comics
- Format: Ongoing series
- Genre: Contemporary fantasy
- Publication date: Mar. – Dec. 2005
- No. of issues: 7
- Main character(s): Amandine, Chai, Louis Bigsky, Medea, Eric Faucon

Creative team
- Created by: Sebastien Caisse and Djief & Kness
- Written by: Sebastien Caisse
- Artist(s): Djief and Kness
- Editor(s): Chris Stone

The Grimoire is a comic book series published by Speakeasy Comics in 2005. A contemporary fantasy story, The Grimoire was created by writer Sebastien Caisse and art studio Grafiksismik.

== Publication history ==
The Grimoire went through a creative team change right after the completion of its first story-arc, which ended with issue #6. A creative difference between the creators and publisher, along with alleged problems over payments, put the collaboration to a halt during the summer of 2005.

Editor Chris Stone took over the writing chores for the series. Of the new team and storyline, only issue #7 was published before the publisher Speakeasy Comics closed in February 2006.

== Plot ==
The Grimoire is passed to Amandine from a mysterious masked stranger. The object's curse it that whoever holds it will find her fate bound to it. What begins as a walk to a friend's house becomes the first steps of an incredible adventure.

== Characters ==
- Amandine — the main character, she is a lonely girl surrounded by material wealth
- Medea — a powerful witch, she is Amandine's mother
- Eric Faucon — Amandine's father
- Chai — a magical, intelligent raccoon who speaks Faeric; he is Eric's former familiar
- Louis Bigsky — chieftain of the Western minotaur tribes
