= Phantom Jack =

- Cover of the first issue

Publication information
- Publisher: Image Comics; Speakeasy Comics
- First appearance: Phantom Jack #1 (2004)
- Created by: Michael San Giacomo

In-story information
- Alter ego: Jack Baxter
- Abilities: Invisibility

Phantom Jack is the eponymous character of a comic book series created by writer Michael San Giacomo. Its publication started in early 2004 as a monthly series at Image Comics, completing its first five-issues story-arc. After a creative team change and a creative difference with the publisher, the title moved to Speakeasy Comics where its first arc was collected in 2005 as a trade paperback.

== Synopsis ==
Newspaper reporter Jack Baxter can turn invisible. Not exactly a hero, Baxter uses his powers to scoop other reporters. His test of fire comes when his brother is captured in Iraq. Jack rescues his brother with the aid of the beautiful Madison Blue, an invisible secret agent for the group 'Miscellaneous'. Stories lean toward realistic portrayals of characters in modern world, not typical super-hero fare. The series ran in 2005 from Image Comics and returned in November 2007, from Atomic Pop Art Entertainment with Absolute Phantom Jack, which collects all the previous Image comics and about 80 pages of new stories. A sequel, Phantom Jack: The Nowhere Man Agenda, a 110-page collection of five stories, was released in August 2010 by IDW Publishing. In the novel, Jack confronts his evil opposite and faces his final fate.

== Bibliography ==
- 2003: Created by Michael San Giacomo as part of Marvel Comics' aborted revival of their "Epic" imprint.
- 2004: Phantom Jack #1-5 is a monthly series at Image Comics, with art by Mitchell Breitweiser and colors by Jaime Jones.
- 2005: Phantom Jack: The Collected Edition (Speakeasy Comics) collects the first series and adds six new stories with new artwork from Sean McArdle and Brett Barkley.
- 2007, January: Phantom Jack: The Absolute Edition collects all the stories in the trade paperback along with two new stories for Atomic Pop Art Entertainment.
- 2009, August: Visionary Comics began releasing the complete run of Phantom Jack through various digital venues. These versions are in standard comic page lengths, but include the short stories from the Absolute Edition TPB and has seven issues.
- 2010, Aug. 18: IDW Publishing released a 110-page graphic novel Phantom Jack: The Nowhere Man Agenda, with art by Sean McArdle, Andy Belanger and Andy Finlayson, inks by Tom Schloendorn, and colors and cover by Nathaniel Fairbairn. The novel features a battle between Jack and his evil, invisible counterpart, The Nowhere Man.
