= Brodie's Law (comics) =

Comic book series

- Brodie's Law cover

Publication information
- Publisher: Pulp Theatre Entertainment
- First appearance: Brodie's Law #1 (Aug. 2004)
- Created by: David Bircham; Daley Osiyemi

In-story information
- Abilities: Ability to steal his victims' souls and take on their appearance, memories and feelings.

Brodie's Law is a comic book series created by Daley Osiyemi and David Bircham which tells the story of antihero, Jack Brodie, East end Gangster, expert thief and professional killer, who in a twist of fate gains the ability to steal his victims' souls and take on their appearance, memories and feelings.

Brodie's Law takes place in the gritty underworld, nightclubs and dark alleys of the seedy metropolitan area of London.

== Plot ==
A criminal called Jack is sent by his contractor, the CEO and shareholder of the research company, Eugene Della Cruz, to break into a high tech lab and steal a disc that contains a top-secret experiment. A third party gets wind of the job and everything goes horribly wrong. Jack realizes that it was a set up and he escapes barely alive.

This makes front-page news and Brodie suddenly becomes the most wanted man in Britain. He goes underground, seeking refuge away from the world and for the first time he fails to see a way out. Things come apart fast as his son is kidnapped and he is framed for his ex-wife's murder. He begins to lose his sense of self-belief and everything Brodie ever valued is gone. Forced to live like an animal, his hideout becomes his new home, only stepping out of the shadows under the cover of darkness.

In a bid to fight back, Brodie does whatever it takes to find his son, clear his name and seek his revenge. With the help of Tomokai Yoshida, a genetic scientist, Brodie finds a way to turn the tables. The disc he stole earlier contains the blue print for a process called Psycho Metamorphosis or PM13, a compound that stimulates a human's latent ability to morph from one human likeness to another, male or female. Brodie realizes the power that comes with anonymity, without a fixed identity the law cannot track him. The compound was only a prototype and so is inherently unstable. Brodie never knows how long it will work and with each metamorphosis the process takes its toll. His victims once touched are left in a coma, helpless until their identity is returned. In essence Brodie becomes a soul reaper. The process of transformation is far from clean and Brodie partially retains the soul of each person he touches. Each journey into the body of another takes Brodie further into the darker recesses of the human mind. Brodie is no longer alone; with each passing day, the voices within grow louder.

== Tattoo ==
Brodie's unique tattoo which covers his back originates from a symbol called "Takai" which means "Face of Death". In ancient Japan it represented the mask worn by a samurai warrior called "Kayuma" who was head of the "Kabuki Death Seekers Clan". He was feared and revered by all. He was known for not sparing the lives of enemies captured in battle. It was claimed that he made a pact with the Devil, that if he collected the souls of the dead this would in turn make him stronger and more fearless in battle.

Jack Brodie came across the symbol when reading an earlier version of the "Hagakure" Way of the Samurai. The symbol immediately had a profound effect on him. He saw similarities between Kayuma and himself and started using the symbol as his calling card, a sign that spelt trouble for those who crossed him.

The symbol later came to have a different meaning to Brodie. After he gained his powers of transformation the symbol that spelt danger for others soon became a symbol that almost cost him his own life.

== Characters ==
=== Main characters ===
- JACK BRODIE

Boasting that he has never hurt a tax-paying citizen in his life, Jack views his 'career' as a community service. From the very beginning Jack wore a mask, deceiving himself that eliminating hard-nosed criminals was a moral crusade. Jack has always been on the wrong side of the law, as he felt that this lifestyle choose him rather than the other way around. Jack has an ex-wife Marla and a son Damien. His wife left him because of his criminal life style. Jack has a way of evaluating a job. He is a philosophical man, following an ancient Japanese Samurai code of loyalty, honour and trust.

- TOMOKAI YOSHIDA

Tomokai is an intelligent, beautiful young (Japanese) genetic scientist at P-FACT Research and daughter of a Japanese billionaire in the pharmaceutical industry. She was fired at P-FACT and kidnapped by Jack whom she falls in love with and helps him out of his predicament. She knows her love-hate relationship with Jack, is fraught with danger, but she sticks with him with the hopes of a better outcome. She has a brother back in Japan called 'Kenzo' who is the black sheep of the family and belongs to an organised crime syndicate.

- EUGENE DELLA CRUZ

Brodie's ultimate nemesis, utterly corrupt billionaire and puppet master Eugene is a man who sees the fun side of evil. Eugene is the man in the West End, a city high-flyer, businessman and property developer. He owns the media friendly conglomerate Della Enterprise that is situated in London Tower Bridge. A man driven by ambition, power and greed, Eugene has influential friends in high places. Dell Tilson is his nemesis, a business rival that he respects because of Dell's cold single- mindedness. Not at all sentimental, Eugene doesn't care who gets screwed over, just so long as he gets what he wants.

- HARRY WADE

Estranged friend of Brodie, detective Wade is the covert agent sent by Scotland Yard to track down Jack Brodie and retrieve the stolen formula. He goes about his job in a low-key fashion and gets results by whatever means necessary. He is an experienced tracker of wanted criminals, as they never see him coming. He has a history with Jack, as they were once childhood best friends. He rides around in his vintage Ford Capri and like Jack, he is quick, intelligent and able to get out of any situation. He is a man committed to his job and his motivation to see Jack captured was business as usual but his strong ties with Jack later made him see things differently.

=== Secondary characters ===
- STICKS

Curtly 'Sticks' Wilkins is a Rastafarian informant and small time dealer. A very close friend of Jack, he trusts Jack with his life, having been saved once by Jack. He got his name Sticks from his onetime occupation as drummer for a reggae band in the 1970s. He usually hangs out at his friend's barbershop called Krew Kuts. He is an informant for both the police and criminals alike. He has a wife called Rita who is a nurse and a daughter.

- DELBERT TILSON

Delbert Tilson (also known as Dell) is the local crime boss, entrepreneur and Lord of the Manor. He runs his business empire with brute force. He runs a legitimate chain of Bars, pool halls and a boxing gym in Bethnal Green, but these are only fronts for his real business, which are extortion, prostitution, protection and money laundering. He is a man driven by ambition and power. His heir to his empire is Jamie Tison, his only son, who tries hard to please his father. Dell is often seen in the company of his two trusted bodyguards, "The Barry brothers", Paul and Sean Barry.

- DR. RUPERT JAMESON

The creator behind Project Jameson, Dr. Rupert Jameson is a head of genetic research at P-FACT. He was approached with regards to finding new ways for top secret agents to infiltrate terrorist camps and enemy states, and he saw this as being an ideal opportunity to finance his most recent discovery of R.C.G.M or Rapid Controlled Genetic Mutation.

- TONY T.

Anthony Thomas, also known as Tony T. 'The Psychopathic killer', is the most feared around town, who gets an enormous amount of pleasure from torturing his victims. He is known as a 'Jack the Lad' character always seen in designer gear. He takes care of Eugene Della Cruz's dirty work behind the scenes and only a few know who he really works for.

- THE BARRY BROTHERS

Dell Tilson's loyal bodyguards, Paul and Sean Barry are step-brothers from the same father and different mother.

== Awards ==
Brodie's Law was nominated for an Eagle Award in 2006 for "Favourite Colour Comic book – British".

== Issues ==
After the initial volume, publication was taken over by Markosia, a new edition of the volume 1 trade paperback was released.

=== Vol. 1 Project Jameson ===
Vol. 1: is made up of six, first series issues:

- BRODIE'S LAW #1: Project Jameson
- BRODIE'S LAW #2: Close Encounter
- BRODIE'S LAW #3: Testing Times
- BRODIE'S LAW #4: Double Exposure
- BRODIE'S LAW #5: Blunted Reality
- BRODIE'S LAW #6: End Game

=== Trade paperback ===
Brodie's Law: Project Jameson (plot by Daley Osiyemi & David Bircham, Script by Alan Grant, art by David Bircham, cover by Simon Bisley, third edition: August 2006, Markosia, ISBN 0-9550082-0-4)

=== Vol. 2 ===
Vol. 2: is made up of five issues:

- BRODIE'S LAW #7: Hide 'n' Seek
- BRODIE'S LAW #8: Unexpected Visitor
- BRODIE'S LAW #9: Due East

== Adaptation ==
In February 2017, writer/director John Pogue had signed on to helm a film version of the comic, with a screenplay written by Kirsten McCallion.
