= The Sisters Grimm =

2005–2012 fantasy book series by Michael Buckley

- The Fairy-tale Detectives; The Unusual Suspects; The Problem Child; Once Upon a Crime; Magic and Other Misdemeanors; Tales from the Hood; The Everafter War; The Inside Story; The Council of Mirrors
- Author: Michael Buckley
- Illustrator: Peter Ferguson
- Country: United States
- Language: English
- Genre: Children's fantasy mystery novel
- Publisher: Abrams Books
- Published: 2005–2012
- Media type: Print (hardback)

The Sisters Grimm is a children's fantasy series written by Michael Buckley and illustrated by Peter Ferguson. The series is partially based on the works and lives of the Brothers Grimm, with the titular protagonists, Sabrina Grimm and Daphne Grimm, being their fictional descendants, and the supporting cast featuring many characters from the Grimms’ collection of fairytales.

As of 2023, an animated television series is in development for Apple TV+ by Per Capita Productions. The series, titled The Sisters Grimm, was released on October 3, 2025.

== Summary ==
After their parents disappear, sisters Sabrina and Daphne Grimm are sent to live with their grandmother, Relda Grimm, in the town of Ferryport Landing. As soon as the sisters arrive, they learn they are descendants of the Brothers Grimm, who were actually detectives of the magical phenomenon perpetrated by the Everafters, a parallel race of magical beings and creatures.

They soon discover it is the Grimm family's legacy to keep the Everafters in line and the two sisters are the sole heirs to this challenge. Working as detectives in their family business, the sisters Grimm solve mysteries possibly connected to the disappearance of their parents. While following their family traditions, they also must deal with Puck, a trickster fairy boy who lives with them. Unfortunately for the sisters, the Scarlet Hand, an evil group of Everafters, seeks to escape from the town and take over the world.

== Books ==
- The Fairy-tale Detectives: In the first book of the series, the Sisters Grimm are pitted against giants, who have been rampaging through Ferryport Landing in their search for an young Englishman named Jack who is in jail for an unspecified crime. Sabrina and Daphne discover the unusual truth about their paternal family from their eccentric grandmother, who instructs them in the ways of supernatural detectives, as they try to locate and rescue their parents from a rogue organization called the Scarlet Hand.
- The Unusual Suspects: The Sisters Grimm start school at Ferryport Landing Elementary. Daphne gets Snow White for a teacher, while Sabrina's stuck with Mr. Grumpner and a class of mildly psychotic sixth graders. When Mr. Grumpner is murdered in a particularly unusual way, it is up to the Grimms to find the Everafter who did it. A great friend turns into a great enemy, and when the school is blown up by Rumpelstiltskin, who turns into a human bomb, and Mr. Canis does not make it out in time.
- The Problem Child: The Sisters Grimm face their parents' kidnappers, an organization of Everafters who call themselves the Scarlet Hand. One of them turns out to be Little Red Riding Hood, and the other, the Jabberwocky, an unstoppable killing machine. The girls have little hope of rescuing their mother and father until their long-lost Uncle Jake returns home with stories of a weapon, now missing, that can kill the Jabberwocky. Sabrina, given a wand by Uncle Jake, gets a magic addiction. Only the Blue Fairy can put the pieces of the Vorpal Sword together.
- Once Upon a Crime: The girls and their friends must figure out who killed Puck's father, King Oberon, while coming to terms with their mother Veronica's secret life.
- Magic and Other Misdemeanors: Someone is stealing the magical possessions of the most powerful Everafters in town. Granny is distracted by Mayor Heart's campaigning against human residents, the girl detectives are on their own. Puss in Boots (now an exterminator), Cinderella (a radio relationship counselor), Briar Rose (owner of a coffee shop), and their old enemy, Prince Charming, are among the many suspects. The girls get sucked into the future and are surprised at what they see.
- Tales from the Hood: A kangaroo court of Everafters, led by the Queen of Hearts, is determined to find Mr. Canis guilty and force the Grimms out of Ferryport Landing. Meanwhile, Puck has decided to focus more on his mischievous ways, making a few new troublemaker friends to protect the family. It's up to Sabrina and Daphne to find evidence to save Mr. Canis.
- The Everafter War: Sabrina and Daphne's parents awake from their sleeping spell, but they are caught in the middle of a war between the Scarlet Hand and Prince Charming's Everafter army. As the family works to help the prince and protect their friends, Sabrina faces the family's deadliest enemy, the mysterious Master.
- The Inside Story: Picking up where the cliffhanger ending of book seven left off, this book follows Sabrina, Daphne, and Puck through the Book of Everafter, where all the fairy tales are stored and enchanted characters can change their destinies. The girls and Puck must chase the Master through a series of stories. Soon, however, they are confronted by The Editor - the book's guardian - who, along with an army of tiny monsters known as Revisers, threaten the children with dire consequences if they don't stick to the stories. They move from one legendary tale to the next doing their best to find the Master and stop his plan to steal and inhabit the child's body.
- The Council of Mirrors: The final battle has begun. Sabrina, Daphne and their family and friends must fight the Master, who has failed to escape Ferryport Landing. After his failure, the Master turns to plan B: kill every last member of the Grimm family until the barrier surrounding the town falls. The Grimm family and the Scarlet Hand must join hands against the Master.
- The Sisters Grimm: A Very Grimm Guide: Released in January 2012, the Guide contains extra information about Ferryport Landing, the characters and the series itself.

== Adaptations ==
=== Television Series ===
In May 2023, a series based on the Sisters Grimm book series was first announced to be in development. In August 2025, Amy Higgins was announced as the series' showrunner and executive producer alongside Buckley. Additional executive producers include Elliot Blake, Philip Alberstat, Steven Amato, Theresa Park, Chris Prynoski, Shannon Prynoski, Ben Kalina, and Antonio Canobbio, while Sage Cotugno serves s supervising director. Titmouse, Inc. was also announced as the series' production company. Erika Rothchild originally developed the series, before being replaced by Higgins during production; Rothchild received a co-developer credit in the series. In September 2025, Buckley said it was possible for the series to get renewed for a second season. 12 episodes were produced, released as the series' first two seasons.

== Awards ==
The Sisters Grimm series received many honors, including the Oppenheim Toy Portfolio Platinum Award and the Kirkus Reviews Best Fantasy Book award. The series is also a New York Times bestseller.
