= Ubunchu! =

Japanese manga series by Hiroshi Seo

- logo using Ubuntu colours

うぶんちゅ！ (Ubunchu!)
- Genre: Comedy
- Manga
- Written by: Hiroshi Seo
- Published by: ASCII Media Works
- Magazine: Weekly ASCII, Ubuntu Magazine Japan
- Original run: May 14, 2008 – June 7, 2013
- Volumes: 1

Ubunchu! (うぶんちゅ！) is a comedy manga serialized in ASCII Media Works' Weekly ASCII and Ubuntu Magazine Japan between May 2008 and June 2013. Its name is a play on words combining the Linux distribution Ubuntu and a Japanese onomatopoeia for a kiss, chu (ちゅ).

== Plot ==
The story follows the activities of the three members of the Ichinomiya Prefectural High School's system administration club (part of the wider IT club). Each chapter is focused on a certain aspect of the Ubuntu operating system or a related topic, such as command-line interfaces, input methods, Linux Mint, or software licensing.

== Characters ==
Akane Kisaragi (如月 あかね)
President of the system administration club, Akane is a *nix evangelist and very knowledgeable about network and Linux system administration.
Masato Midō (御堂 マサト)
Vice-president of the system administration club, Masato is a Windows user and very versed in internet culture.
Risa Shiina (椎名 里沙)
The system administration club's only regular member, Risa is a Mac user and not very skilled with computers except for media design.
Akiha Shinozaki (篠崎 あきは)
President of the computer science club, Akiha is in part responsible for the school's IT equipment and generally opposed to FLOSS solutions.

== Release ==
Besides print publication in ASCII Media Works' magazines, most of the manga's chapters are freely available online and released under a Creative Commons license. Furthermore, a tankōbon was published in 2012 containing the first eight chapters as well as two short extra stories.

Because of its release under a permissive license allowing use in derivative works, Ubunchu! has been translated to at least 17 different languages by fans.

Chapter	Original title	Translated title	Published online	Published in print	Magazine	Volume
1	うぶんちゅがやって来た！	"Ubunchu" has come along!	2008-11-25	2008-05-14	Weekly; ASCII	カンタンUbuntu!
2	CUIとコビトとお姉さま	CLI with gnomes!	2009-05-26	2008-07-29	Weekly; ASCII	カンタンUbuntu!2
3	フォーラムデビューはまだ早い？	Time for the Forums to debut?	2009-11-25	2008-11-26	Weekly; ASCII	らくちんUbuntu!
4	三匹のうさぎたち	The Three Bunnies	2009-11-30	2009-05-27	Weekly; ASCII	さくさくUbuntu!
5	ビッグシスター参上！	Big Sister Arrives!	2010-02-20	2009-09-29	Ubuntu; Magazine; Japan	1
6	コアラにうってつけの日	A Perfect Day for Koala	2011-05-27	2009-11-30	Ubuntu; Magazine; Japan	2
7	アルティメット・インストールフェスト！	The Ultimate Installfest!	2010-09-04	2010-02-23	Ubuntu; Magazine; Japan	3
8	今日はもうMooしましたか？	Have You Mooed Today?	2011-05-27	2010-05-31	Ubuntu; Magazine; Japan	4
9	日本語入力革命カナメ	Revolutionary IME Kaname	2012-06-10	2010-08-31	Ubuntu; Magazine; Japan	5
10	インターフェース戦争勃発！？	Outbreak of an interface war!?	2012-06-17	2011-12-10	Ubuntu; Magazine; Japan	6
11	お嬢様は老執事がお好き！？	My lady is fond of her old butler!?	2012-06-24	2012-03-09	Ubuntu; Magazine; Japan	7
12	妹系覇権ディストリ！ミントちゃん	Rule of a sister distro! Mint-chan	2012-09-11	2012-06-11	Ubuntu; Magazine; Japan	8
13	伝統ある文芸部の分裂	Break-up of a long-standing literature club	2013-03-08	2012-09-06	Ubuntu; Magazine; Japan	9
14	あなたのハードを動かし隊！	Smooth operators of hardware and hearts	2013-07-31	2012-11-30	Ubuntu; Magazine; Japan	10
15	Ubuntu Touchは見た！？	Have you seen Ubuntu Touch!?	-	2013-06-07	Ubuntu; Magazine; Japan	2013 Summer
