= Beowulf: The Game =

2007 action-adventure video game

- Developers: Tiwak; Ubisoft Shanghai; Virtuos (PSP)
- Publisher: Ubisoft
- Director: Gilles Matouba
- Composer: Cris Velasco
- Platforms: Microsoft Windows, PlayStation 3, Xbox 360, PlayStation Portable
- Release: Xbox 360: NA: November 13, 2007; EU: November 16, 2007; AU: November 22, 2007; PlayStation 3: NA: November 13, 2007; AU: November 22, 2007; EU: November 23, 2007; Microsoft Windows: NA: November 13, 2007; EU: November 16, 2007; AU: November 2007; PlayStation Portable: NA: December 4, 2007; AU: December 13, 2007; EU: December 14, 2007
- Genres: Action, hack and slash
- Mode: Single-player

Beowulf: The Game is a 2007 action-adventure video game developed by Tiwak and Ubisoft and published by Ubisoft. It was released for Microsoft Windows, PlayStation 3, PlayStation Portable and Xbox 360. It is based upon the 2007 motion-capture film Beowulf, which in turn was based upon the epic poem of the same name. The characters are voiced by the original actors who starred in the film.

== Plot ==
The story begins with Beowulf racing on a beach with a fellow Thane. On the beach they slay crabs and then Beowulf races with the Thane in the sea, where he is attacked by a sea serpent. He fights the serpent on a small rock structure but is defeated and thrown into the water; there, Grendel's mother appears and says he is her new hero, and grants him power. Beowulf defeats the sea serpent with his newfound power and returns to the beach where he was racing with the Thane.

Afterward, having heard the problem the Danes are facing, he goes to help King Hrothgar to stop Grendel, gaining Heroic powers on the journey. Afterwards, the player plays through the thirty years of Beowulf's life as king of the Danes, which was not seen in the movie. Beowulf gets to journey from Heorot to Iceland, defeating demons and large creatures, from a giant hellhound to trolls.

== Reception ==
Reception

Aggregate scores
Aggregator	Score			
Aggregator	PC	PS3	PSP	Xbox 360
GameRankings	44.95%	54.45%	47.67%	54.02%
Metacritic	44/100	51/100	44/100	51/100

Review scores
Publication	Score			
Publication	PC	PS3	PSP	Xbox 360
Edge	N/A	N/A	N/A	5/10
Eurogamer	N/A	N/A	N/A	5/10
Game Informer	5.75/10	5.75/10	N/A	5.75/10
GamePro	N/A	3/5	N/A	3/5
GameRevolution	N/A	D	N/A	D
GameSpot	5/10	5/10	3.5/10	5/10
GameSpy	N/A	2.5/5	N/A	2.5/5
GameZone	N/A	N/A	N/A	5/10
IGN	4/10	4/10	N/A	4/10
Official Xbox Magazine (US)	N/A	N/A	N/A	6/10
PC Gamer (US)	49%	N/A	N/A	N/A
PlayStation: The Official Magazine	N/A	2.5/5	N/A	N/A

The game met with mixed reception. GameRankings and Metacritic gave it a score of 55% and 51 out of 100 for the PlayStation 3 version; 54% and 51 out of 100 for the Xbox 360 version; 48% and 44 out of 100 for the PSP version; and 45% and 44 out of 100 for the PC version.
