= Michael Buckley (author) =

American writer

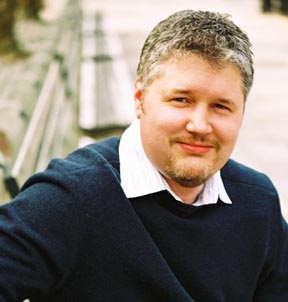
- Buckley in 2007
- Born: Michael Buckley; August 16, 1969 (age 57); Akron, Ohio
- Education: Ohio University; University of Akron
- Occupation: Author
- Children: Finn Buckley
- Writing career
- Period: 2004–present
- Genres: Children's literature and Young Adult
- Notable works: N.E.R.D.S.; The Sisters Grimm; Undertow trilogy; Robotomy
- Website: michaelbuckleywrites.com

Michael William Buckley (born August 16, 1969) is an American children's author whose works include The Sisters Grimm, the N.E.R.D.S. book series, and Finn and the Intergalactic Lunchbox. He is also the co-creator of the animated TV series Robotomy.

== Early life ==
Born in Akron, Ohio, Michael Buckley attended Ohio University, where he graduated with honors. Shortly after graduating from Ohio University in 1986, Buckley moved to New York City.

== Career ==
Sometime after college Buckley moved to New York City to start an internship with the Late Show with David Letterman, then moved into a television production job where he worked on documentaries. His books are published by Harry N. Abrams. Buckley worked as a stand-up comic as well as a TV copywriter before he started to write The Sisters Grimm series. Buckley had originally planned for The Sisters Grimm to be a television series until his wife suggested turning it into a book.

In 2010, Buckley and his writing partner, Joe Deasy, created an animated series for Cartoon Network called Robotomy, which lasted one season. Buckley and Deasy executive produced as well as wrote the first season that starred Patton Oswalt and Dana Snyder (Master Shake from Aqua Teen Hunger Force). The series aired in CN's prime time block.

He is currently writing the screenplay for a N.E.R.D.S. animated feature developed by Elton John's Rocket Pictures. He also recently finished his new series, Undertow.

Michael Buckley has a son, Finn.

== Bibliography ==
=== The Sisters Grimm ===
1. The Fairy-Tale Detectives (2005)
2. The Unusual Suspects (2005)
3. The Problem Child (2006)
4. Once Upon a Crime (2007)
5. Magic and Other Misdemeanors (2007)
6. Tales from the Hood (2008)
7. The Everafter War (2009)
8. The Inside Story (2010)
9. The Council of Mirrors (2012)
  - The Sisters Grimm: A Very Grimm Guide (2012)

=== N.E.R.D.S. ===
1. N.E.R.D.S.: National Espionage, Rescue, and Defense Society (2009)
2. N.E.R.D.S.: M is for Mama's Boy (2010)
3. N.E.R.D.S.: The Cheerleaders of Doom (2011)
4. N.E.R.D.S.: The Villain Virus (2012)
5. N.E.R.D.S.: Attack of the Bullies (2013)

=== Undertow ===
1. Undertow (2015)
2. Raging Sea (2016)
3. Heart of the Storm (2017)

=== Other ===
- Kel Gilligan's Daredevil Stunt Show (2012)
- Robotomy
