= Beowulf (2007 film) =

Film by Robert Zemeckis

- Theatrical release poster
- Directed by: Robert Zemeckis
- Screenplay by: Neil Gaiman; Roger Avary
- Based on: Beowulf by Anonymous
- Produced by: Steve Starkey; Robert Zemeckis; Jack Rapke
- Starring: Ray Winstone; Anthony Hopkins; John Malkovich; Robin Wright Penn; Brendan Gleeson; Crispin Glover; Alison Lohman; Angelina Jolie
- Cinematography: Robert Presley
- Edited by: Jeremiah O'Driscoll
- Music by: Alan Silvestri
- Production companies: Shangri-La Entertainment; ImageMovers
- Distributed by: Paramount Pictures (North America); Warner Bros. Pictures (International)
- Release dates: November 5, 2007 (Westwood); November 16, 2007 (United States)
- Running time: 114 minutes
- Country: United States
- Language: English
- Budget: $150 million
- Box office: $196.4 million

Beowulf is a 2007 American adult animated epic medieval fantasy action film produced and directed by Robert Zemeckis, and written by Neil Gaiman and Roger Avary, loosely based on the Old English poem Beowulf. It features the voices of Ray Winstone, Anthony Hopkins, Robin Wright Penn, Brendan Gleeson, John Malkovich, Crispin Glover, Alison Lohman, and Angelina Jolie. The film depicts a modern interpretation of the poem, with certain changes to aspects of its story. It was produced by Shangri-La Entertainment and Zemeckis's ImageMovers and features characters animated using motion-capture animation, which was previously used in The Polar Express (2004) and Monster House (2006).

Beowulf premiered at Westwood, Los Angeles on November 5, 2007, and was released theatrically in the United States on November 16 by Paramount Pictures, with Warner Bros. Pictures handling international distribution. It grossed over $196 million and was generally well received by critics, though there was criticism towards its deviations from the original poem.

== Plot ==
In 507, Geatish warrior Beowulf travels to Denmark with his band of soldiers, to slay Grendel, a creature that killed King Hrothgar's people during a celebration in the mead hall Heorot. Beowulf becomes attracted to Hrothgar's wife Queen Wealtheow.

To lure out Grendel, the men loudly celebrate in Heorot while, to ensure a fair and equal fight, Beowulf strips naked and relaxes. Grendel arrives and as they fight, Beowulf discovers that Grendel has hypersensitive hearing and ruptures the creature's eardrum. After Beowulf severs his arm, Grendel escapes back to his cave and dies. Grendel's mother swears revenge. In thanks for defeating the monster, Hrothgar gives Beowulf his golden drinking horn, which commemorates Hrothgar's victory over the dragon Fafnir.

Grendel's mother travels to Heorot and slaughters Beowulf's men in the night. Hrothgar informs Beowulf and Beowulf's best friend Wiglaf that Grendel's mother is the last of the Water Demons. Hrothgar's adviser, Unferth, offers Beowulf his sword Hrunting to slay Grendel's mother. Beowulf and Wiglaf travel to the demon's cave, where Beowulf enters alone and confronts the demon, who takes the form of a beautiful, gold-covered naked woman. He tries to kill her but she uses magic to melt Hrunting, after which she seduces Beowulf and promises to make him king in exchange for the horn and a son. Beowulf accepts the deal and they kiss.

Beowulf returns to Heorot with Grendel's head and announces that he has killed Grendel's mother. He recounts embellished stories of a fight, claiming that he left Hrunting impaled in Grendel's mother and lost the horn in the battle. In private, Hrothgar asks Beowulf if he truly killed Grendel's mother. Despite Beowulf's calling her a hag, Hrothgar is not fooled. The king indirectly reveals that he had also been seduced by the demon, their tryst resulting in Grendel. As a shocked Beowulf realizes the implication that the curse of Grendel's mother has now been passed on to him, Hrothgar declares Beowulf to be king upon his death. He then jumps from the castle parapet onto the sea below to his death. Grendel's mother claims Hrothgar's corpse and the crowd kneels to the newly crowned King Beowulf, fulfilling their bargain.

Fifty years later, the elderly Beowulf is the estranged husband of Wealtheow, who has converted to Christianity. Beowulf has a mistress, Ursula, but his tryst with Grendel's mother has left him sterile. On the anniversary of his victory against Grendel, Unferth returns the horn, which was found on the moors. That night, a nearby village is razed by a dragon. It transforms into a golden humanoid figure, who gives a message to Beowulf: the sins of the father have returned to him (referencing the Faustian bargain with Grendel's mother that he agreed to). Beowulf confesses to Wealtheow about his affair with Grendel's mother and they reconcile.

Beowulf and Wiglaf go to the cave, and Beowulf enters alone. When Grendel's mother appears, Beowulf throws her the horn, but she refuses it. The dragon attacks Beowulf's castle, threatening Wealtheow and Ursula. Beowulf arms himself and confronts the dragon. After a grueling fight, Beowulf kills the dragon by ripping its heart out, severing his own arm and losing his sword in the process. The dragon transforms into its golden humanoid form, before being washed out to sea. A dying Beowulf reveals to Wiglaf his affair with Grendel's mother and his son's identity, but Wiglaf insists on keeping his legacy intact.

As the new king, Wiglaf gives Beowulf a Norse funeral. Wiglaf finds the horn and sees Grendel's mother give Beowulf a final kiss as his burning ship sinks into the sea. Grendel's mother floats on the water's surface and seductively beckons Wiglaf towards her. He wades into the sea with the horn, before pausing halfway in the surf. They both stare at each other with Grendel's mother waiting and Wiglaf tempted, but showing resistance.

== Cast ==
- Ray Winstone as Beowulf, the title character. Zemeckis cast Winstone after seeing his performance as the title character of the 2003 ITV serial Henry VIII. On the topic of the original poem, Winstone commented during an interview, "I had the beauty of not reading the book, which I understand portrays Beowulf as a very one-dimensional kind of character; a hero and a warrior and that was it. I didn't have any of that baggage to bring with me." Winstone enjoyed working with motion-capture, stating that "You were allowed to go, like theater, where you carry a scene on and you become engrossed within the scene. I loved the speed of it. There was no time to sit around. You actually cracked on with a scene and your energy levels were kept up. There was no time to actually sit around and lose your concentration. So, for me, I actually really, really enjoyed this experience." Unlike some of his castmates, Winstone's animated counterpart bears little resemblance to the actor who was in his early 50s when he filmed the role; Winstone noted that his computer-generated counterpart resembled himself at the age of eighteen, although the filmmakers did not have a photo for reference. Winstone also played a dwarf performer, and the "Golden Man"/Dragon.
- Crispin Glover and Angelina Jolie as Grendel and his mother, the antagonists. Glover had previously worked with Zemeckis in Back to the Future when he portrayed George McFly. Zemeckis had found Glover tiresome on set, because of his lack of understanding of shooting a film, but realized this would not be a problem as on a motion-capture film he could choose his angles later. Glover's dialogue was entirely in Old English. Jolie had wanted to work with Zemeckis, and had read the poem years before but could not remember it well until she read the script and was able to recall basic themes. The actress recounted her first impression of her character's appearance by saying "... I was told I was going to be a lizard. Then I was brought into a room with Bob, and a bunch of pictures and examples, and he showed me this picture of a woman half painted gold, and then a lizard. And, I've got kids and I thought 'That's great. That's so bizarre. I'm going to be this crazy reptilian person and creature.'" Jolie filmed her role over two days when she was three months pregnant. She was startled by the character's nude human form, stating that for an animated film "I was really surprised that I felt that exposed."
- Anthony Hopkins as King Hrothgar. Hopkins noted in an interview that since Zemeckis is an American, he was not certain what accent Hopkins should use for the role of Hrothgar. Hopkins told him, "Well, Welsh would be my closest because that's where I come from." It was also his first time working with motion-capture technology. Hopkins noted, "I didn't know what was expected. It was explained to me, I'm not stupid, but I still don't get the idea of how it works. I have no idea [...] you don't have sets, so it is like being in a Brecht play, you know, with just bare bones and you have nothing else." When asked if he had to read the original poem of Beowulf in school, Hopkins replied: "No, I was hopeless at school. I couldn't read anything. I mean I could read, but I was so inattentive. I was one of those poor kids, you know, who was just very slow, didn't know what they were talking about... So I tried to get around to reading Beowulf just before I did this movie, and it was a good modern translation. It was Trevor Griffiths, I'm not sure, but I couldn't hack it, and I tend to like to just go with the script if it's a good script."
- John Malkovich as Unferth. Malkovich became involved in the project because one of his friends, who had worked with Zemeckis, "spoke very highly of him. I had always found him a very interesting and innovative filmmaker. I liked the script very much and I liked the group involved and the process interested me a great deal also." He found the experience of working with motion capture to be similar to his experiences working in the theater. He also found the process intriguing: "Say you do a normal day of filmmaking. Sometimes that's 1/8 of a page, sometimes it's 3/8th of a page, normally let's say it's 2½ pages, maybe 3. Now it's probably a little more than it used to be but not always. So you may be acting for a total of 20 minutes a day. In this, you act the entire day all the time except for the tiny amount of time it takes them to sort of coordinate the computer information, let's say, and make sure that the computers are reading the data and that you're transmitting the data. It interests me on that level because I'm a professional actor so I'd just as soon act as sit around." Malkovich also recalled that he studied the original poem in high school, and that "I think we got smacked if we couldn't recite a certain number of stanzas. It was in the Old English class and I think my rendition was exemplary."
- Brendan Gleeson as Wiglaf, Beowulf's lieutenant
- Robin Wright as Queen Wealtheow
- Alison Lohman as Ursula, Beowulf's concubine when he is an old king
- Costas Mandylor as Hondshew
- Sebastian Roche as Wulfgar
- Greg Ellis as Garmund
- Tyler Steelman as Young Cain, Unferth's disabled slave which he continually abuses for the slightest mistake.
- Dominic Keating as Adult Cain
- Rik Young as Eofor
- Charlotte Salt as Estrith
- Leslie Harter Zemeckis as Yrsa
- Fredrik Hiller as Finn of Frisia

== Production ==
=== Development ===
Author Neil Gaiman and screenwriter Roger Avary wrote a screen adaptation of Beowulf in May 1997 (they had met while working on a film adaptation of Gaiman's The Sandman in 1996 before Warner Bros. Pictures canceled it). The script had been optioned by ImageMovers in the same year and set up at DreamWorks Pictures with Avary slated to direct and Robert Zemeckis producing. Avary stated he wanted to make a small-scale, gritty film with a budget of US$15–20 million, similar to Jabberwocky or Excalibur. The project eventually went into turnaround after the option expired, to which the rights returned to Avary, who went on to direct an adaptation of The Rules of Attraction.

In January 2005, producer Steve Bing, at the behest of Zemeckis who was wanting to direct the film himself, revived the production by convincing Avary that Zemeckis' vision, supported by the strength of digitally enhanced live action, was worth relinquishing the directorial reins. Zemeckis did not like the poem, but enjoyed reading the screenplay. Because of the expanded budget, Zemeckis told the screenwriters to rewrite their script, because "there is nothing that you could write that would cost me more than a million dollars per minute to film. Go wild!" In particular, the entire fight with the dragon was rewritten from a talky confrontation to a battle spanning the cliffs and the sea.

=== Animation and visual effects ===
Zemeckis drew inspiration for the visual-effects of Beowulf from experience with The Polar Express, which uses motion-capture technology to create three-dimensional CGI images of characters. Appointing Jerome Chen, whom Zemeckis worked with on The Polar Express, the two decided to chart realism as their foremost goal.

Animation supervisor Kenn MacDonald explained that Zemeckis used motion capture because "Even though it feels like live-action, there were a lot of shots where Bob cut loose. Amazing shots. Impossible with live-action actors. This method of filmmaking gives him freedom and complete control. He doesn't have to worry about lighting. The actors don't have to hit marks. They don't have to know where the camera is. It's pure performance." A 25 × 35-foot stage was built, and it used 244 Vicon MX40 cameras. Actors on set wore seventy eight body markers. The cameras recorded real-time footage of the performances, shots which Zemeckis reviewed. The director then used a virtual-camera to choose camera angles from the footage which was edited together. Two teams of animators worked on the film, with one group working on replicating the facial performances, the other working on body movement. The animators said they worked very closely on replicating the human characters, but the character of Grendel had to be almost reworked, because he is a monster, not human.

Over 450 graphic designers were chosen for the project, the largest team ever assembled for a Sony Pictures Imageworks-produced movie as of 2007. Designers at Imageworks generated new animation tools for facial, body and cloth design especially for the movie, and elements of keyframe animation were incorporated into the film in order to capture the facial expressions of the actors and actresses. The mead hall battle scene near the beginning of the film, among others, required numerous props that served as additional markers; these markers allowed for a more accurate manifestation of a battlefield setting as the battle progressed. However, the data being collected by the markers slowed down the studios' computer equipment and five months were spent developing a new save/load system that would increase the efficiency of the studios' resources. To aid in the process of rendering the massive quantities of information, the development team used cached data. In the cases that using cached data was not possible, the scenes were rendered using foreground occlusion, which involves the blurring of different overlays of a single scene in an attempt to generate a single scene film.

Other elements of the film were borrowed from that of others created by Imageworks: Spider-Man 3 lent the lighting techniques it used and the fluid engine present in the Sandman, while the waves of the ocean and the cave of Grendel's mother were modeled after the wave fluid engine used in Surf's Up. The 2007 film Ghost Rider lent Beowulf the fluid engine that was used to model the movements of protagonist Johnny Blaze. Jerome Chen worked to process large crowd scenes as early as possible, as additional time would be needed to process these scenes in particular. As a result, the film's development team designed a priority scale and incorporated it into their processors so graphic artists would be able to work with the scenes when they arrived.

So much data was produced in the course of the creation of the film, the studio was forced to upgrade all of its processors to multicore versions, which run quicker and more efficiently. The creation of additional rendering nodes throughout Culver City, California was necessitated by the movie's production. Mark Vulcano, who had previously worked on VeggieTales and Monster House, served as Senior Character Animator for the film.

In designing the dragon, production designer Doug Chiang wanted to create something unique in film. The designers looked at bats and flying squirrels for inspiration, and also designed its tail to allow underwater propulsion. As the beast is Beowulf's son with Grendel's mother, elements such as Winstone's eyes and cheekbone structure were incorporated into its look. The three primary monsters in the film share a golden color scheme, because they are all related. Grendel has patches of gold skin, but because of his torment, he has shed much of his scales and exposed his internal workings. He still had to resemble Crispin Glover though: the animators decided to adapt Glover's own parted hairstyle to Grendel, albeit with bald patches.

Zemeckis insisted that the character Beowulf resemble depictions of Jesus, believing that a correlation could be made between Christ's face and a universally accepted appeal. Zemeckis used Alan Ritchson for the body model for the title character of Beowulf. Avary had the idea to make Beowulf fight Grendel naked as a reference to Richard Corben's comic book Den, while also taking inspiration from legendary berserkers, who purportedly fought in battles while naked.

== Music ==
Beowulf Original Soundtrack

Soundtrack album by Alan Silvestri
- Released: November 20, 2007
- Recorded: 2007
- Genres: Score, vocal
- Length: 46:52
- Label: WEA / Warner Bros. Records
- Producers: Glen Ballard and Alan Silvestri

The music for Beowulf was composed and conducted by Alan Silvestri and performed by the Hollywood Studio Symphony. A soundtrack was released November 20, 2007. Silvestri was largely responsible for the production of the soundtrack album, although actresses Robin Wright Penn and Idina Menzel performed several songs in the soundtrack's score.

=== Track listing ===
No.	Title	Performer	Length
1.	"Beowulf Main Title"		0:54
2.	"First Grendel Attack"		1:50
3.	"Gently as She Goes"	Robin Wright	1:36
4.	"What We Need Is a Hero"		1:40
5.	"I'm Here to Kill Your Monster"		1:47
6.	"I Did Not Win the Race"		2:16
7.	"A Hero Comes Home" (in-film version)	Robin Wright	1:08
8.	"Second Grendel Attack"		4:02
9.	"I Am Beowulf"		4:32
10.	"The Seduction"		4:03
11.	"King Beowulf"		1:44
12.	"He Has a Story to Tell"		2:42
13.	"Full of Fine Promises"		1:11
14.	"Beowulf Slays the Beast"		6:01
15.	"He Was the Best of Us"		5:23
16.	"The Final Seduction"		2:52
17.	"A Hero Comes Home" (end credits version)	Idina Menzel	3:13
Total length:			46:52

=== Score credits ===
- Music Composed and Conducted by: Alan Silvestri
- Score Produced by: Alan Silvestri and David Bifano
- Orchestrated by: John Ashton-Thomas and Alan Silvestri
- Music Performed by: The Hollywood Studio Symphony
- Score Contracted by: Sandy DeCrescent and Peter Rotter
- Choir Performed by: Page LA Studio Voices and Hollywood Film Chorale
- Vocal Contracting: Bobbi Page and Sally Stevens
- Score Coordination: David Bifano
- Score Preparation: JoAnn Kane Music Services
- Recorded and Mixed by: Dennis Sands
- Digital Recording by: Erik Swanson
- Recordists: Tom Hardisty and Adam Olmsted
- Score Recorded at: Todd-AO Scoring Stage
- Music Editor: Ryan Rubin
- Assistant Music Editor: Jeannie Marks
- Supervising Music Editor: Kenneth Karman

=== Instrumentation ===
- Strings: 28 violins, 12 violas, 10 violoncellos, 8 double basses
- Woodwinds: 3 flutes, 3 oboes, 3 clarinets, 3 bassoons
- Brass: 8 French horns, 4 trumpets, 4 trombones, 2 tubas
- Percussion: 7 players
- 2 harps, 2 pianos
- Choir: 38 singers

=== Songs credits ===
==== Tracks 3, 7, 17 ====
- Written and Produced by: Glen Ballard and Alan Silvestri
- Strings Arranged and Conducted by: Alan Silvestri
- Recorded by: Scott Campbell
- Additional Engineer: Bill Malina
- Mixed by: Scott Campbell at Pacifique Studios, Hollywood CA
- Contractor for Glen Ballard: Jolie Levine
- Aerowave Coordinators: Stephanie Kubiak and Angela Vicari
- Recorded at: The High Window, Hollywood CA

==== "A Hero Comes Home" (End credits version) ====
- Performed by: Idina Menzel
- Guitar: Tim Pierce
- Drums: Blair Sinta
- Programming, Keys and Guitar: Glen Ballard

=== Soundtrack album credits ===
- Album Mastered by Stephen Marcussen at Marcussen Mastering

== Differences from the poem ==
There are a lot of questions. For example, Grendel is described as half-man, half-demon. The mother is described as a water-demon. So who's Grendel's father? Grendel's always dragging men off alive to the cave. Why? Why is he never attacking Hrothgar? […] And if Hrothgar is Grendel's father, then what happens to Beowulf when he goes into that cave? Did he kill the monster? Did he kill Grendel's mother? Or did he make a pact with the demon? It was those kinds of questions that allowed us to explore deeper into the myth, and in a way that I don't think bastardizes the original myth; I think it actually is a deeper examination of it.

— Roger Avary

One objective Zemeckis, Gaiman and Avary shared was to expand on the original poem as it has been recorded. Beowulf is generally considered to be a pagan tale written down by Christian monks, which for Zemeckis and Avary represented the possibility that the original story had been tampered with in order to better fit Christian sensibilities. They found this to be a reasonable explanation for critical elements to the story that are absent from the poem, such as the identity of Grendel's father, why he abstains from attacking Hrothgar, and the lack of proof that Grendel's mother had been slain.

In order to restore those points, they offered their own interpretation for motivations behind Grendel's behavior and for what happened in the cave of Grendel's mother, justifying it by arguing that Beowulf acts as an unreliable narrator in the portion of the poem in which he describes his battle with Grendel's mother. Avary said their goal was "to remain truer to the letter of the epic but to read between the lines and find greater truths that had been explored before", while Gaiman commented, "the glory of Beowulf is that you are allowed to retell it" due to the presence of many other adaptations that offered their own take on it.

These choices also helped them to better connect the third act to the second of their screenplay, which is divided in the poem by a 50-year gap.

Some of the changes made by the film as noted by scholars include:

- The portrayal of Beowulf as a flawed man
- The portrayal of Hrothgar as a womanizing alcoholic
- The portrayal of Unferth as a Christian
- The portrayal of Grendel as a sickly-looking and child-like creature (somewhat similar to Tolkien's Gollum character), rather than a savage demon-monster
- Beowulf's funeral
- The portrayal of Grendel's mother as a beautiful seductress, more of a succubus rather, who bears Grendel as Hrothgar's child and the dragon as Beowulf's child (this is also the case in the plot of the 1999 film Beowulf, with the exception that the dragon is entirely absent there)
- The fact that Beowulf becomes ruler of Denmark instead of his native Geatland

This is not the first time that the theme of a relationship between Beowulf and Grendel's mother was explored by Gaiman. In his 1998 collection of short stories, Smoke and Mirrors, the poem Bay Wolf is a retelling of Beowulf in a modern-day setting. In this story, Beowulf as the narrator is ambiguous about what happened between Grendel's mother and himself.

== Themes ==
Drawing extensively on the theories of Freud, Kristeva, Lacan and Jung, as well as Žižek, many scholars have discussed the themes of the film. In particular, the portrayal of Grendel and his kin appeals to multiple forms of sexual unease, among them the castration anxiety, the monstrous feminine and the challenging of traditional gender roles. According to Nickolas Haydock, the film reflects the "American obsession with sex as the root of all evils", to the extent to compare Beowulf's and Hrothgar's portrayals to Bill Clinton and the history of sexual misconduct that caused his political decline. Nadine Farghaly also argues the story makes the point that unbridled desire only causes ruin.

Grendel's mother is represented in the film as a castrating, monstrous female who threatens masculinity. While Beowulf embodies phallic power through his physical strength, recurrent nudity and usage of a sword, all those prove useless against her, as she symbolically emasculates him by subsuming his phallus into the feminine power. This is metaphorized by Beowulf being seduced in her womb-like cave, where his sword strike magically fails at harming her body. After copulating with Grendel's mother, both Hrothgar and Beowulf find themselves unable to maintain fulfilling sexual relationships with Wealtheow or other women, becoming aged, bitter and even feminized in their impotency. In turn, Grendel's mother remains immortal and young, and through her offspring she proves capable to wield herself the robbed phallus. Grendel and the dragon act as extensions of her will, "mindless embodiments of feminine aggressiveness" who represent their fathers' emasculation and loss of patriarchal power.

Later Beowulf claims to have vanquished the mother, having supposedly rendered her dead with his sword in her cave, but the falsity of this only translates as a wishful, pretended triumph of the male over the female. His defeat to her, as well as his bargain for prestige and glory, transmits that male power "not only comes from the feminine, but remains eternally subject to it". However, authors have noted that he ultimately breaks the Oedipian triangle caused by his destructive son, as he manages to kill the dragon and seemingly thwart the cycle at the cost of his life. This has been interpreted as a last exaltation of masculinity, electing to die in self-sacrifice rather than living in his impotent, feminized state. He already refers to himself as "dead long time ago" in a previous scene. The film still underlines the irresistibility of female power, as even Wiglaf, who had been shown to be abstinent from lust in contrast to his partners, is hinted to be similarly seduced by Grendel's mother.

The film contrasts those points to the original poem, using the "postmodern techniques of metatextuality and deconstruction". Whereas in the poem the heroic values of ancient warrior culture is reaffirmed, in the film it is shown to be in decline, even explicitly failing along with Beowulf. In the film, the character laments the old, heroic pagan religion is being replaced by Christianity, which encourages weakness in his view. In the poem Beowulf slays Grendel's mother and defeats her challenge on gender roles, but her film version is victorious over him, also using seduction instead of strength, which updates the ways in which the story views female power. The gold covering her skin and the Faustian bargain she offers embody similar modern views on the relationship between wealth and sex, particularly societal compulsions to enjoy them at the fullest, "not prohibited but demanded, which becomes a postmodern variation of Freud's death wish".

However, the main difference from the poem is portraying Beowulf as a flawed hero destroyed by his own negative qualities, like lust for power and unchecked male desire, which raises questions about the morality underlying heroism. Despite the superficial characterization of the Water Demons as Others, the film blurs the line between heroes and monsters, as Grendel can talk, and the dragon's human form resembles Beowulf himself, representing his repressed wishes. In turn, Beowulf and Hrothgar are rendered impotent just like Grendel, who lacks genitalia altogether, and then Beowulf ends up losing an arm like Grendel does. At the end, although the men from the film pretend to be champions against demonkind, they are ultimately revealed to be only its very originators.

== Release ==
At San Diego Comic-Con in July 2006, Gaiman said Beowulf would be released on November 22, 2007. The following October, Beowulf was announced to be projected in 3D in over 1,000 theaters for its release date in November 2007. The studios planned to use 3D projection technology that had been used by Monster House (another motion-captured animated film that Zemeckis was involved on, but only as an executive producer), Chicken Little and the 3D re-release of The Nightmare Before Christmas, but on a larger scale than previous films. Beowulf would additionally be released in 35 mm alongside the 3D projections.

Originally, Columbia Pictures (which also distributed Monster House) was set to distribute the film, but Steve Bing did not finalize a deal and instead arranged with Paramount Pictures for North American distribution and Warner Bros. Pictures for international distribution. Beowulf was also set to premiere at the 2007 Venice Film Festival, but was not ready in time. Instead, the film's world premiere was held in Westwood, Los Angeles on November 5, 2007.

Critics and even some of the actors expressed shock at the British Board of Film Classification rating of the film—12A—which allowed children under twelve in Britain to see the film if accompanied by their parents. Angelina Jolie called it "remarkable it has the rating it has", and said she wouldn't be taking her own children to see it. In the United States, the Motion Picture Association of America gave the film a PG-13 rating for "intense sequences of violence including disturbing images, some sexual material and nudity".

=== Marketing ===
To promote the film, a novelization of the film, written by Caitlín R. Kiernan, was published in September 2007. The novelization includes Sigga, a fortune teller who reveals to Unferth about Beowulf and Hrothgar's affairs with Grendel's mother, and implies Grendel's mother to have been the mermaid. Kiernan's novel also expands on the film's ambiguous ending, with Wiglaf having successfully resisted Grendel's mother and putting an end to her curse cycle. This was followed by a four-issue comic book adaptation by IDW Publishing released every week in October 2007.

A video game based on the film entitled Beowulf: The Game was released on Xbox 360, PlayStation 3, PC and PSP formats. The game was announced by Ubisoft on May 22, 2007, during its Ubidays event in Paris. It was released on November 13, 2007, in the United States. The characters are voiced by the original actors who starred in the film, with the exception of John Malkovich, Robin Wright, Alison Lohman Crispin Glover and Angelina Jolie. On November 1, 2007, Beowulf: The Game was released for mobile phones. The side-scrolling action video game was developed by Gameloft.

Several cast members, including director Robert Zemeckis, gave interviews for the film podcast "Scene Unseen" in August 2007. This is noteworthy especially because it marks the only interview given by Zemeckis for the film.

=== Home media ===
Beowulf was released for Region 1 on DVD February 26, 2008. A director's cut was also released as both a single-disc DVD and two-disc HD-DVD alongside the theatrical cut. The theatrical cut includes A Hero's Journey: The Making of Beowulf while the single disc director's cut features four more short features. The HD DVD contains eleven short features and six deleted scenes.

The director's cut was released on Blu-ray Disc in the United Kingdom on March 17, 2008, and in the United States on July 29, 2008. The Blu-ray edition includes a "picture-in-picture" option that allows one to view the film's actors performing their scenes on the soundstage, before animation was applied (a notable exception to this is Angelina Jolie, whose scenes are depicted using storyboards and rough animation rather than the unaltered footage from the set).

== Reception ==
=== Box office ===
Beowulf ranked #1 in the United States and Canada box office during its opening weekend date of November 18, grossing $28.1 million in 3,153 theaters.

At the end of its theatrical run, the film had grossed an estimated domestic total of $82.3 million and a foreign box office total of $114.1 million for a worldwide gross of $196.4 million.

=== Critical response ===
On the review aggregator website Rotten Tomatoes, Beowulf has received an approval rating of 71% based on 194 reviews, with an average score of 6.50/10. The website's consensus reads, "Featuring groundbreaking animation, stunning visuals, and a talented cast, Beowulf has in spades what more faithful book adaptations forget to bring: pure cinematic entertainment." On Metacritic, the film has a weighted average score of 59 out of 100 based on 35 reviews, indicating "mixed or average" reviews. Audiences polled by CinemaScore gave the film an average grade of "B−" on an A+ to F scale.

Giving Beowulf three out of four stars, Roger Ebert commented that the film is a satire of the original poem. Time magazine critic Richard Corliss described the film as one with "power and depth" and suggested that the "effects scenes look realer, more integrated into the visual fabric, because they meet the traced-over live-action elements halfway. It all suggests that this kind of a moviemaking is more than a stunt. By imagining the distant past so vividly, Zemeckis and his team prove that character capture has a future." Corliss later named it the tenth-best film of 2007. Rolling Stone critic Peter Travers praised the motion capture used in the film and argued that "The eighth-century Beowulf, goosed into twenty-first century life by a screenplay from sci-fi guru Neil Gaiman and Pulp Fiction's Roger Avary, will have you jumping out of your skin and begging for more... I've never seen a 3-D movie pop with this kind of clarity and oomph. It's outrageously entertaining."

Tom Ambrose of Empire gave the film four out of five stars. He wrote that Beowulf is "the finest example to date of the capabilities of this new technique [...] Previously, 3D movies were blurry, migraine-inducing affairs. Beowulf is a huge step forward [...] Although his Cockney accent initially seems incongruous [...] Winstone's turn ultimately reveals a burgeoning humanity and poignant humility." Ambrose also argues that "the creepy dead eyes thing has been fixed". Justin Chang of Variety thought that the screenwriters "have taken some intriguing liberties with the heroic narrative [... the] result is, at least, a much livelier piece of storytelling than the charmless Polar Express". He also stated that "Zemeckis prioritizes spectacle over human engagement, in his reliance on a medium that allows for enormous range and fluidity in its visual effects yet reduces his characters to 3-D automatons. While the technology has improved since 2004's Polar Express (particularly in the characters' more lifelike eyes), the actors still don't seem entirely there."

Kenneth Turan of NPR criticized the film, writing: "It's been 50 years since Hollywood first started flirting with 3-D movies, and the special glasses required for viewing have gotten a whole lot more substantial. The stories being filmed are just as flimsy. Of course Beowulf does have a more impressive literary pedigree than, say, Bwana Devil. But you'd never know that by looking at the movie. Beowulf's story of a hero who slays monsters has become a fanboy fantasy that panders with demonic energy to the young male demographic." Manohla Dargis of The New York Times compared the poem with the film, stating that "If you don't remember this evil babe from the poem, it's because she's almost entirely the invention of the screenwriters Roger Avary and Neil Gaiman and the director Robert Zemeckis, who together have plumped her up in words, deeds and curves. These creative interventions aren't especially surprising given the source material and the nature of big-studio adaptations. There's plenty of action in Beowulf, but even its more vigorous bloodletting pales next to its rich language, exotic setting and mythic grandeur."

Diana F. Ye gave the film three out of five, praising the effects and action scenes, Peter Bradshaw, reviewing for The Guardian criticized the effects and sexual jokes but praised the story. Bradshaw rated the film 3 stars out of 5. Ted Alvarez criticized the story, gags and motion effects.

=== Academic response ===
Scholars and authors criticized the changes made to the poem's story. Southern Methodist University's Director of Medieval Studies Bonnie Wheeler is "convinced that the new Robert Zemeckis movie treatment sacrifices the power of the original for a plot line that propels Beowulf into seduction by Angelina Jolie—the mother of the monster he has just slain. What man doesn't get involved with Angelina Jolie?' Wheeler asks. 'It's a great cop-out on a great poem.' ... 'For me, the sad thing is the movie returns to... a view of the horror of woman, the monstrous female who will kill off the male,' Wheeler says. 'It seems to me you could do so much better now. And the story of Beowulf is so much more powerful.'" Other commentators pointed to the theories elucidated in John Grigsby's work Beowulf and Grendel, where Grendel's mother was linked with the ancient Germanic fertility goddess Nerthus.

However, there were also positive academic reviews. Philosophy professor Stephen T. Asma argued that "Zemeckis's more tender-minded film version suggests that the people who cast out Grendel are the real monsters. The monster, according to this charity paradigm, is just misunderstood rather than evil (similar to the version presented in John Gardner's novel Grendel). The blame for Grendel's violence is shifted to the humans, who sinned against him earlier and brought the vengeance upon themselves. The only real monsters, in this tradition, are pride and prejudice. In the film, Grendel is even visually altered after his injury to look like an innocent, albeit scaly, little child. In the original Beowulf, the monsters are outcasts because they're bad (just as Cain, their progenitor, was outcast because he killed his brother), but in the film Beowulf the monsters are bad because they're outcasts [...] Contrary to the original Beowulf, the new film wants us to understand and humanize our monsters."

Andrew E. Larsen criticized the film for its changes from the poem, criticizing the characters of Hrothgar and Beowulf as well as Wealtheow and Grendel's mother, and felt the script to be "misogynistic".

== See also ==
- Epic film
- Germanic Heroic Age
- Lists of historical films
- Late antiquity

== Bibliography ==
- Ashton, Gail (2015). Medieval Afterlives in Contemporary Culture. Bloomsbury Publishing. ISBN 978-1-44116068-3.
- Clark, David (2019). Beowulf in Contemporary Culture. Cambridge Scholars Publishing. ISBN 978-1527544062.
- Farghaly, Nadine (2015). Beyond the Night: Creatures of Life, Death and the In-Between. Cambridge Scholars Publishing. ISBN 9781443881364.
- Fugelso, Karl (2014). Ethics and Medievalism. Boydell & Brewer. ISBN 9781843843764.
- Haydock, Nickolas; Risden, E. L. (2013). Beowulf on Film: Adaptations and Variations. McFarland. ISBN 9780786463381.
- Kline, Daniel T. (2013). Digital Gaming Re-imagines the Middle Ages. Routledge. ISBN 978-1-13622183-5.
- McDonald, Kathleen (2010). Americanization of History: Conflation of Time and Culture in Film and Television. Cambridge Scholars Publishing. ISBN 9781443826242.
