= Translating Beowulf =

Challenges of translating the Old English poem Beowulf

Beowulf was traditionally believed to have been composed for performance and chanted by a scop to musical accompaniment. Illustration by Joseph Ratcliffe Skelton, c. 1910

The difficulty of translating Beowulf from its compact, metrical, alliterative form in a single surviving but damaged Old English manuscript into any modern language is considerable, matched by the large number of attempts to make the poem approachable, and the scholarly attention given to the problem.

Among the challenges to the translator of Beowulf are whether to attempt a verse or prose rendering; how closely to stick to the original; whether to make the language archaic or to use distinctly modern phraseology; whether to domesticate or foreignize the text; to what extent to imitate the original's laconic style and understatement; and its use of intentionally poetic language to represent the heroic from what was already an ancient time when the poem was composed.

The task of the poet-translator in particular, like that of the Anglo-Saxon poet, is then to assemble multiple techniques to give the desired effects. Scholars and translators have noted that it is impossible to use all the same effects in the same places as the Beowulf poet did, but it is feasible, though difficult, to give something of the feeling of the original, and for the translation to work as poetry.

== Context ==
=== Poem ===
Beowulf is an Old English heroic epic poem of some 3182 lines of alliterative verse, of anonymous authorship. It was composed sometime between the 8th and the 11th century; the only surviving manuscript was written in or around the year 1010.

=== Translations ===
Beowulf has been translated many times in verse and in prose, and adapted for stage and screen. By 2020, the Beowulf's Afterlives Bibliographic Database listed some 688 translations and other versions of the poem, in at least 38 languages.

== Challenges ==
Among the challenges noted by the translator Michael J. Alexander are whether to attempt a verse or prose rendering; how closely to stick to the original; and whether to make the language archaic, as indeed the original was, or to use distinctly modern phraseology. In addition, the original is both laconic and full of understatement. He wrote that "the blend of metre, syntax, diction and idiom in the artistic economy of the original can only be [achieved] by redistributing the rarer effects. Each line and sentence necessarily sacrifices some quality in the original. What you lose here, you hope to restore there."

=== Verse or prose ===
From the start, translators had reasons to put their versions of Beowulf into prose. The scholar of Old English literature Hugh Magennis writes that this was often but not always to aid study. John Mitchell Kemble's "literal" 1837 prose, forming the first complete version in modern English, was, like many that followed it, meant to assist readers in interpreting the Old English text that it accompanied. Magennis notes that Kemble stressed the "differentness" of Beowulf as a reason for not attempting to make his translation smoother.

Grendel reaches Heorot
Beowulf 710–714 (Note: Citations from Beowulf are from Electronic Beowulf 4.0 edited by Kevin Kiernan, using the "Traditional" numbering option.)

Ða com of more | under misthleoþum
Grendel gongan, | godes yrre bær.
mynte, se manscaða | manna cynnes,
sumne besyrwan | in sele þam hean·

John Mitchell Kemble's 1837 prose

Then under veils of mist came Grendel
from the moor; he bare God's anger,
the criminal meant to entrap some one
of the race of men in the high hall.

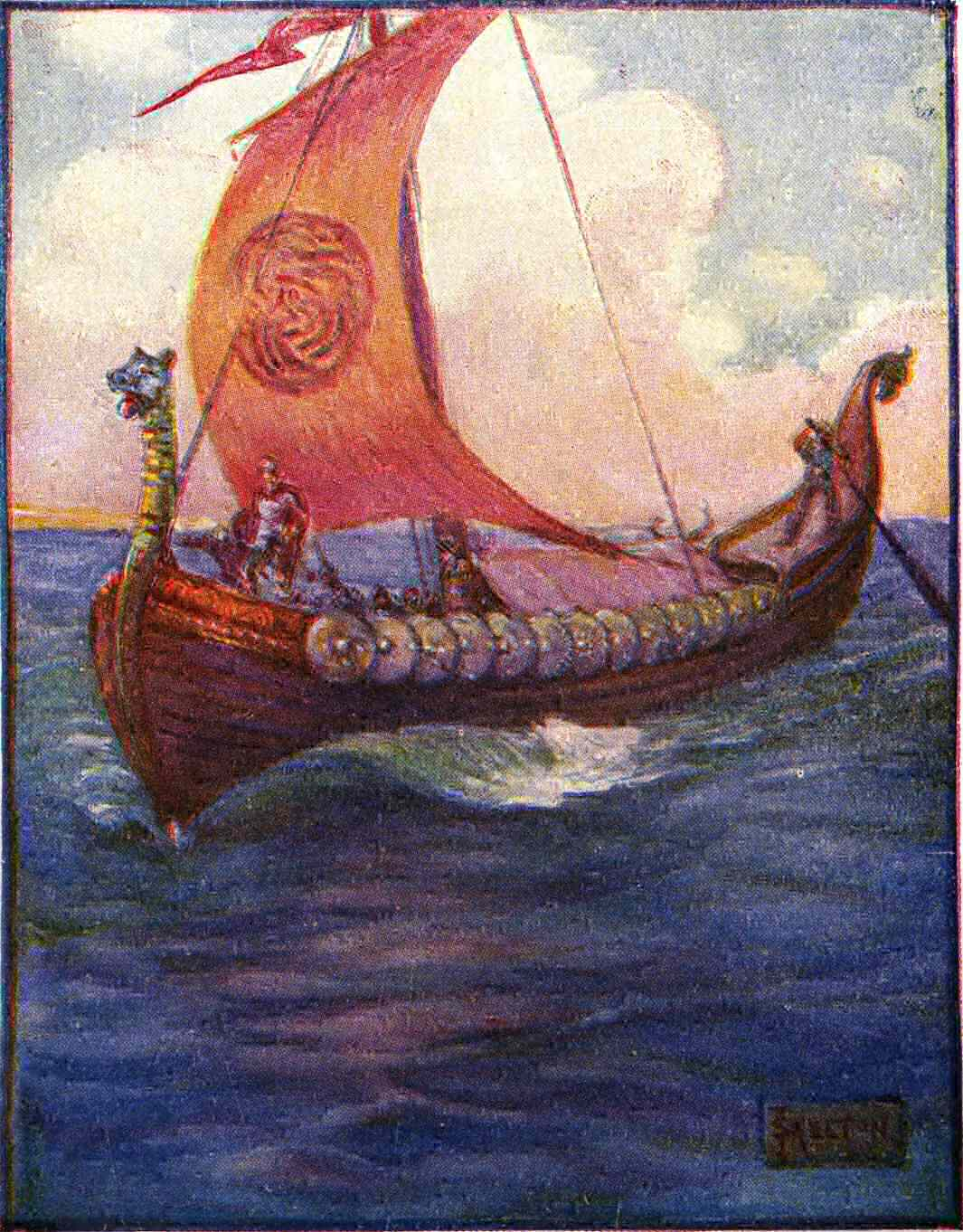
Beowulf sails for Heorot. Illustration by J. R. Skelton

Old English verse has rules very unlike those of modern verse. Its pattern is made up of half-lines, each of which contains two stresses, but not a fixed number of syllables, with a caesura between the halves; a sentence may end mid-line. Lines do not rhyme; internal rhyme is a rare device for special effect. Stressed words alliterated, but not in the modern sense. All vowels were considered to alliterate with each other, so the modern English word 'old' would alliterate with 'eager'. Further, the whole sound of the word should join in the alliteration, not just the first letter, so in Oft Scyld Scefing || sceaþena þreatum, the "she..." sounds echo each other across the central caesura. There had to be at least one alliterating stress in each half-line. The compact half-line phrases are often made indirect with kennings like banhus, "bone-house", meaning "body", but also implying the brief span of life while the soul is housed in the body. These can be mapped on to modern kennings, preserving the Beowulf poet's indirectness, or translated to unpack the kenning and render the meaning more or less directly:

Imagery or directness: translating kennings
Line	Beowulf	Unpacked meaning	Alexander 1973, literal	Heaney 1999, rather literal	Wright 1957, unpacking
200	swanrade	sea	swan's riding	swan's road	sea
208	sundwudu	ship	sound-wood	boat	ship
1523	beadoleoma	sword	battle-flame	battle-torch	flashing blade
3116	isernscure	shower of arrows	iron shower	arrow-storm	rain of steel

Evidently, imitating all these features at once, and the aesthetically desired and intentional compactness of Old English verse, in any modern language, is problematic. On the other hand, abandoning the attempt and translating into prose at once loses much of the appeal of the original, though this has not deterred many authors from using the approach. J. R. Clark Hall produced first a translation in prose, in 1901, and then one in verse, in 1914.

Here, Beowulf sets sail for Heorot in the poet David Wright's popular and frequently reprinted Penguin Classics prose version, and in Seamus Heaney's prize-winning verse rendering, with word-counts to indicate relative compactness:

Beowulf sails for Heorot, in verse and prose
Beowulf folio 137r

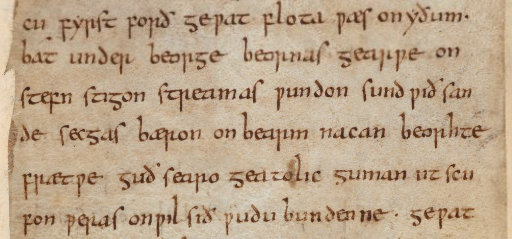

Beowulf lines 210–216

Fyrst forð gewat; | flota wæs on yðum,
bat under beorge. | Beornas gearwe
on stefn stigon, — | strēamas wundon,
sund wið sande; | secgas bæron
on bearm nacan | beorhte frætwe,
guðsearo geatolic; | guman ut scufon,
weras on wilsīð | wudu bundenne.

(37 words)
David Wright's 1957 prose

Soon the boat was launched and afloat
below the headland. The soldiers, in
full harness, came aboard by the prow
and stowed a cargo of polished armour
and magnificent war-equipment amidships,
while the sea churned and surf beat
against the beach. Then the adventurers,
bound on the voyage they had eagerly
desired, pushed off their well-braced
vessel.

(57 words)
Seamus Heaney's 1999 verse

Time went by, the boat was on water,
in close under the cliffs.
Men climbed eagerly up the gangplank,
sand churned in surf, warriors loaded
a cargo of weapons, shining war-gear
in the vessel's hold, then heaved out,
away with a will in their wood-wreathed ship.

(46 words)

Magennis writes that Wright's justification for prose, that the essence of Beowulf was its story and that the job of a translation was to put this across plainly, was soon agreed by critics to be incorrect, and his version was superseded by translations such as Alexander's that captured more of the poem's feeling and style.

Alexander observed that the question of whether to translate into prose or verse is intertwined with that of freedom versus closeness to the original, writing that "Scholars who find [my verse] version too free have to consider whether literal prose does not too freely discard the potential advantages of verse." He remarked that whereas he once thought prose renderings of poetry "useless", and most prose translations "drab", experience with several verse translations, and especially George N. Garmonsway's (Note: Garmonsway's life and work is briefly summarized at the Jisc archive.) prose with its "dignity and rhythmical shape", changed his mind; and in any case in his view a poetic translation "is an equivalent, not a substitute". Noting that the Old English was chanted to a string accompaniment, Alexander concluded by hoping that his readers would read his verse aloud.

Nicholas Howe suggested three types of modern version: "high poetic translation", where literal accuracy is sacrificed to the spirit of the original and the presence of the poet/translator, as in William Morris, Edwin Morgan, Burton Raffel, and Seamus Heaney; "verse translation", somewhat faithful to Old English technique, with the translator much less visible, as in Charles Kennedy, Marijane Osborn, Stanley Greenfield and Roy Liuzza; and "prose translation", accurate to the narrative and parts of the poetic technique "while sacrificing most of its poetic spirit", as in John R. Clark Hall and E. Talbot Donaldson.

=== Faithful or free ===
In 1680, the poet John Dryden proposed that translations could be classified according to how faithful or free they set out to be:

metaphrase [...] or turning an author word for word, and line by line, from one language into another; paraphrase [...] or translation with latitude, where the author is kept in view by the translator so as never to be lost, but his words are not so strictly followed as his sense, and that, too, is admitted to be amplified but not altered; and imitation [...] where the translator – if he has not lost that name – assumes the liberty not only to vary from the words and sense, but to forsake them both as he sees occasion; and taking only some general hints from the original, to run division on the ground-work, as he pleases.

Dryden's metaphrase, "word for word" translation, has long been a contentious issue in the case of Beowulf. In the 19th century, William Morris attempted to render each word of the original with a word or phrase, even if this was archaic or unfamiliar. For instance, he translates sceaþena as "scathers":

William Morris's word for word rendering. The poet recalls Scyld Scefing.
Beowulf 4–5

Oft Scyld Scefing | sceaþena þreatum,
monegum mægþum, | meodosetla ofteah

William Morris's archaizing 1910 verse.

Oft then Scyld the Sheaf-son from the hosts of the scathers,
From kindreds a many the mead-settles tore

J. R. R. Tolkien, in his 1940 essay "On Translating Beowulf", stated that it was not possible to translate each Old English word by a single word and create a readable modern English text. He gave the example of eacen, which might mean 'stalwart', 'broad', 'huge', or 'mighty' according to the context, whereas the word's connotations are of superhuman power, having the strength of 30 men: "not 'large' but 'enlarged'".

Burton Raffel writes in his essay "On Translating Beowulf" that the poet-translator "needs to master the original in order to leave it", meaning that the text must be thoroughly understood, and then boldly departed from. His own effort to do this created what Marijane Osborn calls "the liveliest translation of Beowulf". Magennis writes that this produces "an extremely free imitative verse", at the cost of often misrepresenting the poem, in Raffel's 1963 translation. Magennis describes the version as highly accessible and readable, using alliteration lightly, and creating a "vivid and exciting narrative concerned with heroic exploits ... in a way that [the modern reader] can understand and appreciate. Clarity, logic and progression are hallmarks of this treatment of narrative in Raffel's translation, producing a satisfying impression of narrative connectedness". In contrast, John Porter's 1991 translation is avowedly "literal", published by Anglo-Saxon Books in a facing-page translation to facilitate the study of the original.

"Literal" and free translations. Battle is joined.
Beowulf 1285–1287

þonne heoru bunden, | hamere geþruen,
sweord swate fāh | swin ofer helme
ecgum dyhtig | andweard scireð.

John Porter's "literal" 1991 translation

when blade bound, | by hammer forged,
sword with blood-stained | swine upon helmet
with edges tough | opposite shears.

Burton Raffel's free 1963 verse

Smashing their shining swords, their bloody,
Hammer-forged blades onto boar-headed helmets,
Slashing and stabbing with the sharpest of points.

=== Archaic or modern ===
Several 19th-century translations into English used deliberately archaic diction, in line with the then popular standard approach to medieval literature. William Morris's 1910 The tale of Beowulf is described by Magennis as "a striking experiment in literary medievalism" even by Morris's standards. In Magennis's view, even if Morris's version is considered unsuccessful, it "must be seen as a major artistic engagement with the Old English poem". A. Diedrich Wackerbarth's 1849 version followed the familiar Victorian era convention of Walter Scott-like romance language with "Liegeman true" and "princely Wight", and using rhyme and modern metre (iambic tetrameters) in place of any attempt to imitate the Old English alliterative metre. Here, the Danish watchman challenges Beowulf and his men as they arrive at Heorot:

Wackerbarth's and then Morris's archaic, but not Anglo-Saxon, diction. The coastguard sees Beowulf's men.
Beowulf 331–337

... ... | þa ðær wlonc hæleð
ōretmecgas | æfter æþelum frægn:
'Hwanon ferigeað ge | fætte scyldas,
grǣge syrcan, | ond grimhelmas,
heresceafta heap ? | Ic eom Hroðgares
ar ond ombiht. | Ne seah ic elþeodige
þus manige men | mōdiglīcran.'

A. Diedrich Wackerbarth's
1849 romance verse

A Hero proud, of th' valiant Men:
'Whence bring ye solid Shields away.
And Helmets grim, and Hawberks grey.
And Sheaf of spears ? I pray explain,—
I Hróth-gár's Herald am and Thane:—
And Strangers have I never seen
So many of so noble Mien.'

William Morris's
1910 The tale of Beowulf

... ... There then a proud chief
Of those lads of the battle speer’d after their line:
Whence ferry ye then the shields golden-faced,
The grey sarks therewith, and the helms all bevisor’d,
And a heap of the war-shafts? Now am I of Hrothgar
The man and the messenger: ne’er saw I of aliens
So many of men more might-like of mood.

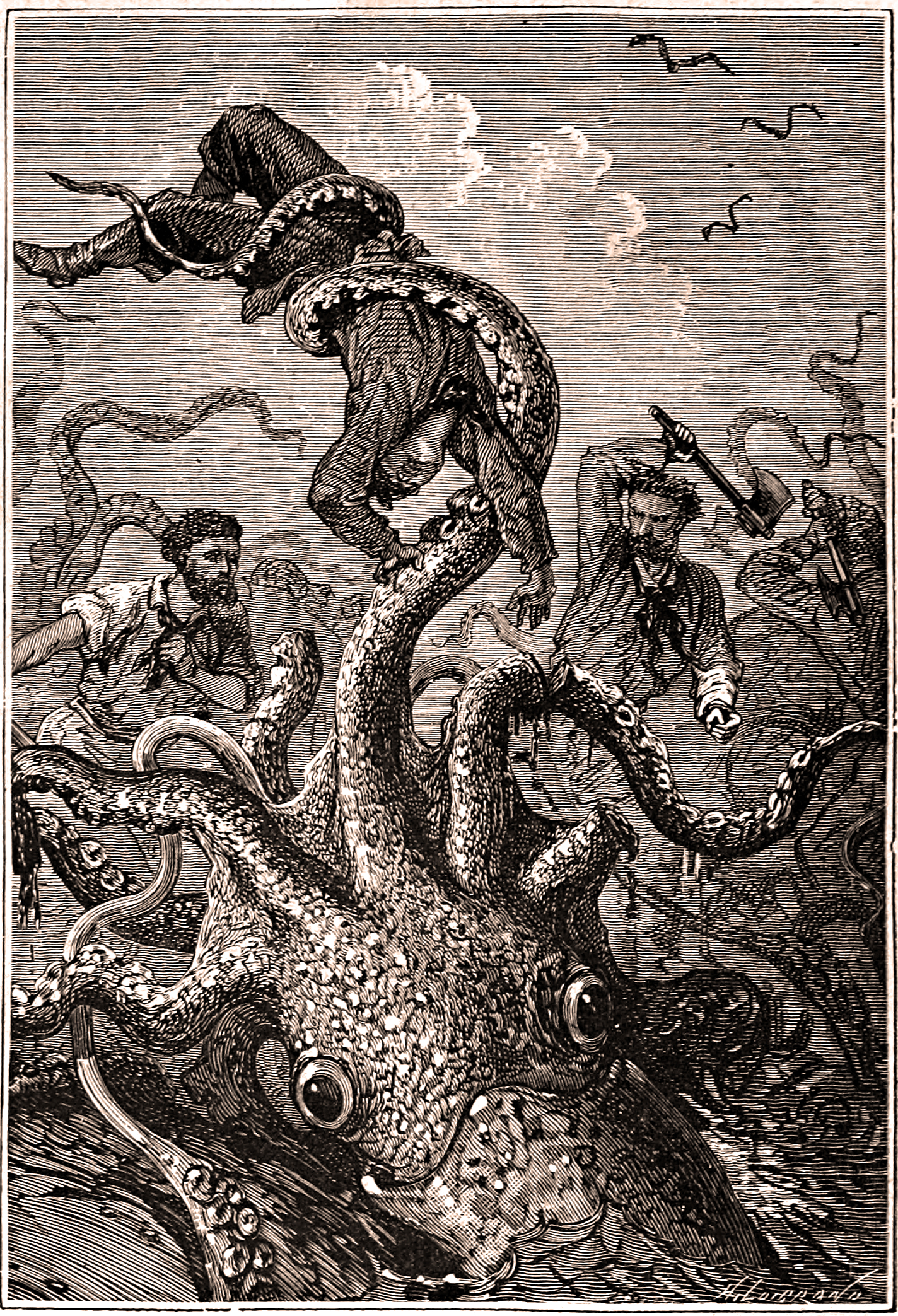
Updated monsters: Edwin Morgan translated nicera not as "necks" or "nixies" but as "krakens". 1870 illustration for Twenty Thousand Leagues Under the Seas

The poet and Beowulf translator Edwin Morgan stated that he was seeking to create a rendering in modern English that worked as poetry for his own age, while accurately reflecting the original. He used inventive compounds to represent Old English kennings, and sometimes incorporated alliteration. Magennis described Morgan's 1952 version "as being on a different level poetically from any translation of the poem that had been produced up until that time and a very significant piece of work in its own right", and "varied, graceful, intelligent and at times exciting". Morgan defined poetry as "the manifestation of energy in order"; in Magennis's view, this can best be seen in Morgan's "scenes of lively action and description", such as when Beowulf tracks the bleeding and mortally-wounded Grendel to his lair. In the passage, Morgan translated nicera not as the cognate "necks" or "nixies" but as "krakens". Magennis describes the rendering of the passage as "sweeping steadily onwards", but "complicated by intricate grammatical development and abrupt oppositions, dense imagery and varied rhythmical effects and ... an insistently mannered diction", reflecting the original:

Morgan's modern "energy in order" as Beowulf tracks Grendel
Beowulf 841–852

... ... | Nō his līfgedāl
sarlic þuhte | secga ænegum
þara þe tīrlēases | trode sceawode,
hu he werigmod | on weg þanon,
niða ofercumen, | on nicera mere
fǣge ond geflymed | feorhlastas bær.
Ðær wæs on blode | brim weallende,
atol yða geswing | eal gemenged,
haton heolfre, | heorodrēore weol;
deaðfæge deof; | siððan dreama lēas
in fenfreoðo | feorh alegde,
hæþene sawle; | þær him hel onfeng.

Edwin Morgan's modern 1952 verse

... Ungrievous seemed
His break with life to all those men
Who gazed at the tracks of the conquered creature
And saw how he had left on his way from that place –
Heart-fatigued, defeated by the blows of battle,
Death-destined, harried off to the tarn of krakens -
His life-blood-spoor. There the becrimsoned
Waters were seething, the dreadful wave-sweep
All stirred turbid, gore-hot, the deep
Death-daubed, asurge with the blood of war,
Since he delightless laid down his life
And his heathen soul in the fen-fastness,
Where hell engulfed him.

Tolkien noted that whatever a translator's preferences might be, the ancients such as the Beowulf poet had chosen to write of times already long gone by, using language that was intentionally archaic and sounding poetic to their audiences. Thus, Tolkien explains, the poet uses beorn and freca to mean "warrior" or "man", this last a usage already then restricted to heroic poetry; at the time, beorn was a variant of the word for bear, just as freca was another word for wolf, and the audience expected and enjoyed hearing such words in the special circumstance of a performance by a scop. The poet used high-sounding language to represent the heroic in the distant past. Tolkien therefore advised the translator to do the same, choosing verbs like "strike" and "smite" rather than "hit" or "whack", nouns like "guest" rather than "visitor", adjectives like "courteous" instead of "polite". His versions of Beowulf's voyage to Heorot in prose and verse, the latter in strictest Anglo-Saxon alliteration and metre (Note: The metrical scheme is explained at On Translating Beowulf § Metre.) (with Tolkien's markup of metrical stresses), are:

Tolkien's high-sounding language, meant to echo the Beowulf poet's diction. Beowulf's ship reaches Denmark.
Beowulf 217-227

Gewat þa ofer wǣgholm | winde gefysed
flota famiheals | fugle gelicost,
oð þæt ymb antid | oþres dogores
wundenstefna | gewaden hæfde,
þæt ða liðende | land gesawon,
brimclifu blican, | beorgas steape,
side sænæssas; | þa wæs sund liden,
eoletes æt ende. | þanon up hraðe
Wedera lēode | on wang stigon,
sæwudu sældon,— | syrcan hrysedon,
guðgewædo;

Tolkien's 1940 verse in
"On Translating Beowulf" (Note: Tolkien translated some 600 lines of Beowulf into verse, but other than this sample, it has (as of 2024) not been published.)

She wènt then over wáve-tòps, | wínd pursúed her,
fléet, fóam-thròated | like a flýing bírd;
and her cúrving prów | on its cóurse wáded,
till in dúe séason | on the dáy áfter
those séafàrers | sáw befóre them
shóre-cliffs shímmering | and shéer móuntains,
wíde cápes by the wáves: | to wáter's énd
the shíp had jóurneyed. | Then ashóre swíftly
they léaped to lánd, | lórds of Góthland,
bóund fást their bóat. | Their býrnies ráttled,
grím géar of wár.

Tolkien's 1926 prose (176–185) in
Beowulf: A Translation and Commentary

Over the waves of the deep she went sped by the wind,
sailing with foam at throat most like unto a bird,
until in due hour upon the second day her curving beak
had made such way that those sailors saw the land,
the cliffs beside the ocean gleaming,
and sheer headlands and capes thrust far to sea.
Then for that sailing ship the journey was at an end.
thence the men of the Windloving folk climbed swiftly up the beach,
and made fast the sea-borne timbers of their ship;
their mail-shirts they shook, their raiment of war.

=== Domesticating or foreignizing ===
Magennis examines the question of domesticating or foreignizing translations of Beowulf, noting that the translation theorist Lawrence Venuti thought any domesticating translation (of any text) "scandalous". Magennis explains that the distinction follows the philosopher Friedrich Schleiermacher's 1813 analysis of whether a translation is bringing the reader to the original, i.e. foreignizing the text, or bringing the text to the reader, i.e. domesticating it. Like Venuti, Schleiermacher favoured foreignizing, but English translators have in Magennis's view for over a century preferred domesticating.

Morris's Beowulf is one of the few distinctively foreignizing translations. It has been poorly received by critics including Morgan, who called it "disastrously bad" and "often more obscure than the original", but later scholars such as Roy Liuzza, whose translation of Beowulf is much admired, are more accepting; Liuzza writes that Morris was "trying to recreate the experience of reading Beowulf in the depth of its history".

Wright's 1957 prose translation is somewhat modernising, aiming for a plain "middle style" between archaism and colloquialism under the banner "better no colours than faked ones", but striving to be as faithful as possible. The novelist Maria Dahvana Headley's 2020 translation is relatively free, domesticating and modernising, though able to play with Anglo-Saxon-style kennings, such as rendering aglæca-wif as "warrior-woman", meaning Grendel's mother. Her feminism is visible in her rendering of the lament of the Geatish woman at the end of the poem: (Note: Maryann Corbett analyses Headley's approach in more detail.)

Modernising approaches in prose and verse. A Geatish woman laments for Beowulf.
Beowulf 3148–3155

... | Higum unrōte
modceare mændon, | mondryhtnes cwealm;
swylce giōmorgyd | Geatisc meowle
æfter Biowulfe | bundenheorde
song sorgcearig, | sæde geneahhe,
þæt hio hyre hearmdagas | hearde ondrede,
wælfylla worn, | wīgendes egesan,
hynðo ond hæftnyd. | Heofon rece swealg.

David Wright's 1957 prose

Sadly they complained of their grief
and of the death of their king.
A Geat woman with braided hair keened a dirge
in Beowulf's memory, repeating again and again
that she feared bad times were on the way,
with bloodshed, terror, captivity, and shame.
Heaven swallowed up the smoke.

Maria Dahvana Headley's 2020 verse

Then another dirge rose, woven uninvited
by a Geatish woman, louder than the rest.
She tore her hair and screamed her horror
at the hell that was to come: more of the same.
Reaping, raping, feasts of blood, iron fortunes
marching across her country, claiming her body.
The sky sipped the smoke and smiled.

A complicating factor is that Beowulf scholarship has been affected by nationalist thinking in various countries. Heaney, a Catholic poet from Northern Ireland (often called "Ulster"), could domesticate Beowulf to the old rural dialect of his childhood family only at the risk of being accused of cultural appropriation. Howell Chickering, for example, who made a verse translation of Beowulf in 1977, wrote that Heaney's use of "Ulsterisms" in the translation, like "hirpling", "keshes", "[a] wean", "reavers", and "bothies", was "a signal of cultural difference", incomprehensible to many readers, and rightly glossed in footnotes. He called Heaney's use of two "different Englishes" "bad cultural and linguistic history", and that it placed the poem as his work rather than as a translation.

Luis Lerate, creating the first complete verse translation in Spanish in 1974, faced the challenge of introducing both an unfamiliar story and an unknown verse-form to his audience. He opted to re-create the cadences of Old English, seeking in María José Gómez-Calderón's view to "reproduce the dignified, elevated tone" and "remarkabl[y]" keeping the number of syllables down to fit the metre convincingly, as shown by the sombre conclusion of the poem:

Imitating medieval cadences in modern Spanish
Beowulf 3180–3184

Swa begnornodon | Geata leode
hlafordes hryre, | heorðgeneatas.
Cwædon þæt he wære | wyruldcyning,
manna mildust | ond monðwærust,
leodum liðost, | ond lofgeornost.

Luis Lerate's verse

La muerte del principe | mucho apenó
A los gautas que un dia | en su sala moraron;
Afirmaban que fue | de entre todos los reyes
El más apacible | y amante del pueblo
El más amigable | y ansioso de gloria.

English (from the Spanish)

The death of the prince | greatly saddened
the Geats who one day | in his room dwelt;
They claimed that he was | of all the kings
The most peaceful | and lover of the people
The friendliest | and [most] eager for glory.

Translating into a language much closer to Old English, Icelandic, the poet Halldóra B. Björnsson had to contend with the possibility of a translation that simultaneously preserved the original's semantics, syntax, and phonology (meaning, function, and form), in what Pétur Knútsson calls a "transliteration", as in "Það var góður konungur!" for "þat wæs god cyning" ("That was a good king!") in line 11. He notes at once that her 1968 version, Bjólfskviða ("The Lay of Bjólfur") rarely does this, opting for sound, form, and connection with mythology over "literal" meaning and syntax. Knútsson gives as an instance of this the use of "bægsli" for "shoulder" rather than "öxl", cognate with Old English "eaxl" in line 1539; this recalls the fourteenth-century Gull-Þóris saga, which some scholars believe is linked to Beowulf – it tells of a hero and his men who venture into a cave of dragons who are guarding a treasure. The bægsli is the shoulder of a beast, such as a dragon or whale; or the flipper of a seal or penguin; in the saga, the men plunge the treasure-swords under the bæxl of the dragons.

Avoiding transliteration in Icelandic
Beowulf 1539–1540

Gefeng þa be eaxle, nalas for fæhðe mearn,
Guð-Geata leod, Grendles modor.

Halldóra B. Björnsson's verse

Greip þá í bægsli - glímdi ósmeykur -
Gautaleiðtogi Grendils móður;

English (from the Icelandic)

Gripped then by the bægsli– wrestled undismayed
the Geatish leader – Grendel's mother

=== Laconic and understated, but embellished ===
The author of a popular and widely used 1973 translation, Michael J. Alexander, writes that since the story was familiar to its Anglo-Saxon audience, the telling was all-important. The audience liked "the elaborate unstraightforwardness with which the expected is disguised", accompanied by "laconic understatement" and negative constructions. Thus, after Wiglaf has had to kill the dragon to enter its mound, he narrates that his reptilian host showed him "little courtesy" for his visit.

Laconic Anglo-Saxon humour about a guest in a dragon's mound
Beowulf 3087–3090

Ic wæs þær inne | ond þæt eall geondseh,
recedes geatwa, | þa me gerymed wæs,
nealles swǣslīce | sið alyfed
inn under eorðweall. | ...

Michael J. Alexander's 1973 verse

I myself was inside there, and saw all
the wealth of the chamber once my way was open
– little courtesy was shown in allowing me to pass
beneath the earth-wall.

Alexander comments that such "grim humour" lives on in the northeastern parts of England where the Vikings settled.

Further, the Old English text is full of embellishments, especially verbal parallels, opposites and variations, so that as the scholar Frederick Klaeber stated, there is a "lack of steady advance"; the narrative takes a step forwards, then a step sideways with "traditional near-synonyms". Alexander gives as example lines 405–407, telling that Beowulf speaks to Hrothgar – but before he opens his mouth, there are three half-lines describing and admiring his shining mail-shirt in different ways:

Ornamentation with asides and variations
Beowulf 404–407

heard under helme, | þæt he on heorðe gestod.
Beowulf maðelode | (on him byrne scan,
searonet seowed | smiþes orþancum):
'Wæs þu, Hroðgar, hal! | ...'

Roy Liuzza's 2000 verse

hardy in his helmet, until he stood on the hearth.
Beowulf spoke — his byrnie gleamed on him,
war-net sewn by the skill of a smith:
'Be well, Hrothgar! ... '

Seamus Heaney's 1999 verse translation

... And standing on the hearth
in webbed links that the smith had woven,
the fine-forged mesh of his gleaming mail-shirt,
resolute in his helmet, Beowulf spoke:
'Greetings to Hrothgar. ...'

Magennis comments of Heaney's version of these lines that he greatly develops the Old English image with his vigorous description, noting that he "is particularly attracted to the net and sewing/weaving metaphors" that the Beowulf poet used of chain mail, and that Heaney consistently associates armour with "webbing".

== Assembling multiple effects ==
Liuzza notes that Beowulf itself describes the technique of a court poet in assembling materials:

Beowulf's self-referential account of Anglo-Saxon artistry in story-telling
Beowulf 867–874

... | Hwīlum cyninges þegn,
guma gilphlæden, | gidda gemyndig,
se ðe ealfela | ealdgesegena
worn gemunde | —word oþer fand
soðe gebunden— | secg eft ongan
sið Bēowulfes | snyttrum styrian,
ond on sped wrecan | spel gerade,
wordum wrixlan; | ...

Liuzza's translation

At times the king's thane,
full of grand stories, mindful of songs,
who remembered much, a great many
of the old tales, found other words
truly bound together; he began again
to recite with skill the adventure of Beowulf,
adeptly tell an apt tale,
and weave his words.

Liuzza comments that wrixlan (weaving) and gebindan (binding) evocatively suggest the construction of Old English verse, tying together half-lines with alliteration and syllable stresses, just as rhyme and metre do in a Shakespearean sonnet. These effects are hard to achieve in modern English, he notes, not least because Old English is an inflected language, not requiring additional prepositions and definite articles like "of the" and "from", "the" and "in" for the sense. Old English audiences, too, were comfortable with the use of many inexact synonyms to provide varying sounds to suit the alliterative scheme, without necessarily adding much to the meaning of the poem; Liuzza gives the example of "king", which might for example be rendered cyning, dryhten, hyrde, ræswa, sigedryhten, þeodcyning, weard, or wine, meaning if interpreted literally "king", "lord", "shepherd", "prince", "victorious lord", "king of the people", "guardian", and "friend".

The exact combination of effects used in the original cannot, as Alexander has stated, be echoed line by line, but the translator can attempt to achieve some equivalent mix of effects in a passage as a whole. He illustrates this with lines 127–128:

An attempt to capture some of the effects of Anglo-Saxon poetry in modern English
Beowulf 127–128
Alexander's "literal" rendering
Alexander's 2000 translation
Texts

þa wæs æfter wiste | wop ūp ahafen,
micel morgensweg.

After the feasting an outburst of weeping was raised up
much noise in the morning.

night's table-laughter turned to morning's
lamentation.

Effects
Alliterate wæs ... wiste ... wōp ... wēg;
counterbalance joy, sorrow
—
Wordplay on "morning" (implied "mourning");
"table ... turned" (implied "turning the tables");
alliterate and counterbalance "laughter ... lamentation"

== Sources ==
- Alexander, Michael J. (2003) [1973]. Beowulf: A New Verse Translation (revised ed.). Harmondsworth: Penguin Classics. ISBN 978-0140449310.
- Garmonsway, George N. (1968). Beowulf and its Analogues. London and New York: J. M. Dent; E. P. Dutton. ISBN 978-0-460-03804-1. OCLC 18824.
- Headley, Maria Dahvana (2020). Beowulf: A New Translation. Farrar, Straus and Giroux.
- Heaney, Seamus (2000) [1999]. Beowulf: A New Verse Translation. London: Faber & Faber. ISBN 978-0571203765.
- Kemble, John Mitchell (1837). A Translation of the Anglo-Saxon Poem of Beowulf with a copious glossary preface and philological notes. London: William Pickering.
- Lerate, Luis; Lerate, Jesús (1999) [1974]. Beowulf y otros poemas anglosajones. Madrid: Alianza Editorial. ISBN 978-84-206-3304-6.
- Liuzza, Roy M. (2013) [2000]. Beowulf: facing page translation (2nd ed.). Peterborough, Ontario: Broadview Press. ISBN 978-1554811137.
- Magennis, Hugh (2011). Translating Beowulf : modern versions in English verse. Cambridge Rochester, New York: D.S. Brewer. ISBN 978-1-84384-394-8. OCLC 883647402.
- Morgan, Edwin (1952). Beowulf: A Verse Translation into Modern English. Aldington, Kent: Hand and Flower Press.
- Morris, William (1910). The tale of Beowulf sometime King of the folk of the Weder Geats. Translated by Wyatt, Alfred John. Longmans.
- Raffel, Burton (2016) [1963]. "On Translating Beowulf". Beowulf. Signet Classics. ISBN 978-0451530967.
- Schleiermacher, Friedrich (2012) [1813]. "On the Different Methods of Translating (Ueber die verschiedenen Methoden des Uebersetzens)". In Venuti, Lawrence (ed.). The Translation Studies Reader. Translated by Bernofsky, Susan. Routledge. ISBN 978-0415613484.
- Schulman, Jana (2012). Beowulf at Kalamazoo : essays on translation and performance. Kalamazoo: Medieval Institute Publications. ISBN 978-1-58044-152-0. OCLC 757177299.
- Tolkien, J. R. R. (1958). Beowulf: the Monsters and the Critics. London: Oxford University Press.
- Tolkien, J. R. R. (1997) [1940]. ""On Translating Beowulf"". In Tolkien, Christopher (ed.). The Monsters and the Critics. HarperCollins. pp. 49–71. ISBN 978-0-261-10263-7.
- Tolkien, J. R. R. (2014). Beowulf: A translation and commentary, together with Sellic spell. London: HarperCollins. ISBN 978-0-00-759006-3.
- Venuti, Lawrence (1998). The Scandals of Translation: Towards an Ethics of Difference. Routledge.
- Wackerbarth, A. Diedrich (1849). Beowulf: An Anglo-Saxon Poem. London: William Pickering.
- Wright, David (1973) [1957]. Beowulf. St Albans: Panther Books.
