= Beowulf: A New Verse Translation =

Translation of Beowulf by Seamus Heaney

- First Edition (Faber & Faber)
- Author: Anonymous (the Beowulf poet)
- Translator: Seamus Heaney
- Language: English, Old English
- Subject: Old English poetry
- Genre: Epic poetry
- Publisher: Farrar, Straus, and Giroux, Faber & Faber
- Publication date: December 1999
- Media type: Print (Hardcover)
- Pages: 256
- ISBN: 0-571-20113-X (1st ed.); 0-374-11119-7 (1st. bilingual ed.)
- OCLC: 427385975
- Dewey Decimal: 829/.3
- LC Class: PE1583.H43 1999

Beowulf: A New Verse Translation (also known as Heaneywulf) is a verse translation of the Old English epic poem Beowulf into modern English by the Irish poet and playwright Seamus Heaney. It was published in 1999 by Farrar, Straus, and Giroux and Faber and Faber, and won that year's Whitbread Book of the Year Award.

The book was widely but not universally welcomed by critics, scholars, and poets. The poet Andrew Motion wrote that Heaney had made a masterpiece out of a masterpiece, while David Donoghue called it a brilliant translation. The critic Terry Eagleton wrote that Heaney had superb control of language and had made a magnificent translation, but that Heaney had failed to notice that treating British and Irish culture as one was a liberal Unionist viewpoint. Howell Chickering noted that there had been many translations, and that it was impossible for any translation to be pure Beowulf, as no translation of the poem could be faithful. He admired the dramatic speeches, but was doubtful of Heaney's occasional use of Northern Irish dialect, as it meant he was writing in "two different Englishes". The Tolkien scholar Tom Shippey wrote that if Heaney thought his dialect had somehow maintained a native purity, he was deluded.

== Background ==
Beowulf is an epic Old English poem, written in the strict metre of alliterative verse. Each line consists of two half-lines, separated by a caesura; each half-line contains two stresses but a variable number of syllables. A sentence may end mid-line. Rhyme is rare throughout the poem. Stressed words alliterated; all vowels were considered to alliterate with each other. Half-line phrases are compact; they are often made indirect using metaphorical kennings.

Seamus Heaney was an Irish poet, playwright and translator, born and raised in a Roman Catholic family in Northern Ireland. He received the 1995 Nobel Prize in Literature. He hoped that translating Beowulf would result in "a kind of aural antidote," and a "linguistic anchor would stay lodged on the Anglo-Saxon sea-floor." Heaney began work on the translation while teaching at Harvard, but a lack of connection to the source material caused him to take a break from the effort. The translation was reinvigorated once he realized connections between the form and manner of the original poem and his own early poetic work, including how his early poems diverted from the conventional English pentameter line and "conformed to the requirements of Anglo-Saxon metrics."

== Book ==
=== Publication history ===
Beowulf: A New Verse Translation was first published in 1999 by Farrar, Straus and Giroux in New York, and by Faber and Faber in London, followed in 2000 by a paperback edition and a bilingual edition. It was included in the seventh edition (2000) of the Norton Anthology of English Literature.

=== Contents ===
The book is dedicated in memory of Heaney's friend, the poet and translator Ted Hughes.

An introduction gives first an overview of Beowulf as a poem. Heaney notes that "one publication stands out" when considering it as a work of literature: J. R. R. Tolkien's 1936 essay "Beowulf: The Monsters and the Critics". Heaney then provides a note about his translation, writing that "I suppose all I am saying is that I consider Beowulf to be part of my voice-right." He at once follows this by stating that coming from an Irish nationalist background and having learnt Irish in a culture which saw that as the language it had been robbed of, it took him "a while" to persuade himself that he was born into the language of Beowulf.

The translation is followed by family trees of the Danish/Shielding's, Swedish/Ongentheow's, and Geat/Hrethel's dynasties; and a note on Old English names by Alfred David.

=== Plot ===
Heorot, the mead-hall of King Hroðgar of the Danes, is under nightly attack by the monster Grendel, killing the king's men as they sleep.

Grendel reaches Heorot
Beowulf 710–714

Ðá cóm of móre under misthleoþum
Grendel gongan· godes yrre bær·
mynte se mánscaða manna cynnes
sumne besyrwan in sele þám héan·

Seamus Heaney's verse

In off the moors, down through the mist-bands
God-cursed Grendel came greedily loping.
The bane of the race of men roamed forth,
hunting for prey in the high hall.

The Prince of the Geats, Beowulf, comes to defend Heorot and defeat the monster Grendel, which he accomplishes by wounding the monster through unarmed combat. Soon after, Grendel's Mother comes to avenge her son, but Beowulf slays her as well, this time by using a sword found among the hoard of treasure in the Mother's cavernous abode.

Beowulf returns to the Geats and becomes their king, ruling for 50 years up until a great dragon begins to terrorize his people. The now old Beowulf attempts to fight the new monster, which he accomplished but at the price of a fatal wound. As he lies dying, he declares Wiglaf as his heir. The old king is buried with a monument by the sea.

== Reception ==
=== Prizes and accolades ===
Heaney's translation was widely welcomed by critics, scholars, and poets, winning the 1999 Whitbread Book of the Year Award. The scholar James S. Shapiro states in The New York Times that Heaney's Beowulf is "as attuned to the poem's celebration of the heroic as he is to its melancholy undertow". Joan Acocella, writing in The New Yorker, compares Heaney's version to the posthumous translation by J. R. R. Tolkien, but states that Heaney focuses more on the poetics rather than the details and rhythm of the original, creating a necessarily free version more fit for the modern reader. Another poet, Andrew Motion, wrote in The Financial Times that Heaney had "made a masterpiece out of a masterpiece".

Other commentators, while respecting the translation, noted that it brought a distinctively Northern Irish voice to the poem. In his introduction, Heaney recalls that he had noticed the likeness of Old English þolian to the Northern Irish (often described as "Ulster") dialect "thole", meaning to suffer or endure; it was a word his aunt and his "big-voiced" relatives had used, giving him a link between the poem and his family. Megan Rosenfeld, in The Washington Post, wrote that the translation was "not criticism-free" but had been "hailed as newly accessible" in the press, for example by The Independent in London.

The scholar and literary critic Terry Eagleton wrote in the London Review of Books, republished in The Guardian, that it was a mistake to imagine that poetry could somehow get right to the heart of material things by using a certain choice of language; it was nonsense to imagine that "Northern" poetry like Beowulf and Ted Hughes's The Hawk in the Rain were "craggy and brawny" while "southern ones are more devious and deliquescent". All poems, Eagleton wrote, make use of linguistic tricks to create the feeling of real phenomena, of restoring words to their full value, and Heaney liked that impression; "hence, perhaps, the rural-born Heaney's affection for Beowulf's burnished helmets and four-square, honest-to-goodness idiom, its Ulster-like bluffness and blood-spattered benches." He called the translation "magnificent", but wrote that treating British and Irish culture as one is a viewpoint of "liberal Unionism", intended "to rationalise British rule of part of the island" of Ireland; Eagleton calls it typical of Heaney to fail to notice this; and difficult to see how Beowulf could be the origin of the poetry of Arthur Hugh Clough or Simon Armitage. All the same, he writes, Heaney is "so superbly in command that he can risk threadbare, throwaway, matter-of-fact phrases" in his translation, dealing casually with the poem's alliterative structure.

Daniel G. Donoghue, in Harvard Magazine, called Heaney's version a "brilliant translation ... resonant with the old, [but] innovative at every turn". He contrasted it with those of two earlier Harvard professors, Henry Wadsworth Longfellow's stumbling and unidiomatic 1838 version of a short passage, and William Alfred in the 1960s, accurate, confident, but rather literal, where "The craft of Heaney's verse line is to make artifice seem natural, so that the syntax of the sea-journey, for example, sails along as swiftly and effortlessly as the ship."

Beowulf and his Geats set sail
Beowulf 211–223

Beornas gearwe
on stefn stigon; streamas wundon,
sund wið sande; secgas bæron
on bearm nacan beorhte frætwe,
guðsearo geatolic; guman ut scufon,
weras on wilsið, wudu bundenne.
Gewat þa ofer wægholm, winde gefysed,
flota famiheals fugle gelicost,
æt ymb antid oþres dogores
wundenstefna gewaden hæfde
þæt ða liðende land gesawon,
brimclifu blican, beorgas steape,
side sænæssas;

Seamus Heaney's verse (Note: Heaney rearranges some sentences, so his lines do not correspond one-to-one with the Old English.)

Men climbed eagerly up the gangplank,
sand churned in the surf, warriors loaded
a cargo of weapons, shining war-gear
in the vessel's hold, then heaved out,
away with a will in their wood-wreathed ship.
Over the waves, with the wind behind her
and foam at her neck, she flew like a bird.
until her curved prow had covered the distance
and on the following day, at the due hour,
those seafarers sighted land,
sunlit cliffs, sheer crags
and looming headlands, the landfall they sought.

Donoghue commented that "every translation negotiates a set of relationships among the original, the translator, and the audience"; the philological skill of a translator such as Alfred is no guarantee of success in translating poetry.

Mel Gussow, in The New York Times, mentioned the translation's surprising success both in Britain and in the United States. He wrote that both written poem and Heaney's recitation had "an Irish tinge", noting Heaney's remark that the version is "about one-third Heaney, two-thirds 'duty to the text'", and his claim that the word "gumption" had "an Anglo-Saxon forthrightness about it".

Katy Waldman, in Slate, writes that there is "no real contest" between Heaney's verse and J. R. R. Tolkien's prose translations. She quotes Tolkien's remark that "it is a composition not a tune", adding at once that "Heaney made it both". In her view, Heaney's translation "at once airier and rougher, feels more contemporary, less bogged down in academic minutiae" than Tolkien's prose, which she grants was never intended for publication. (Note: Tolkien also made a verse translation of part of Beowulf.)

=== Critical ===
Howell Chickering, whose Beowulf verse translation appeared in 1977, called the translation long-awaited in The Kenyon Review, and noted that most reviewers came to it with little or no knowledge of Old English. He admired many aspects of the translation, while criticising specific details for what he saw as failures of Heaney's own poetic logic. He noted that "professional Anglo-Saxonists" gave it the originally derogatory name "Heaneywulf", because in their eyes it was "just not Beowulf", agreeing that of course it could not be, as no translation could be faithful. He remarked, too, on the large number of translations, the "persistent genetic fallacy" of continuity between Old English and the modern variety, the continuing disagreement over what a faithful translation would be, and the difficulty of translating Beowulf given its alliteration, kennings and so on. In Chickering's view, the best of Heaney's work is in the dramatic speeches, some 40% of the text, offering "the sense and tone of the Old English with effortless grace"; he notes that Nicholas Howe called the speeches faithful to the point of "ventriloquism". He comments that Heaney's stated aim of creating a firm, level tone with "foursquare" language brings clarity and force, and a "decorum of language", but can also be dull, and often causes him to "[recast] the shape of sentences in startling and distracting ways". Chickering regrets that Heaney, in his view ironically, "breaks his own decorum" with overwrought imagery, excessive alliteration that the form doesn't require, and wild variations of diction, from chummy colloquiality to clichés like "laid down the law" and "deliberate Ulsterisms". He notes that all can be found in the opening lines of "Heaneywulf", including the controversial "So" for the poem's first word, "Hwæt!". He writes that this start, which in his view should set the tone of the whole work, sounds to various American ears tight-lipped, or "buddy-to-buddy", or "like a Yiddish greeting, or like urban guy talk"; Heaney meant it to recall his rural Northern Irish heritage.

Chickering writes that Heaney's claim in the introduction to have been writing Anglo-Saxon from the start, part of his claimed "voice-right" on the model of "birthright", shows "his desire to appropriate Beowulf for his own poetic voice". He debates Heaney's claim that the choice of Northern Irish dialect offered "a release from cultural determination", stating that instead it reinstated it. The dozen "Ulsterisms" in the translation, like "hirpling", "keshes", "[a] wean", "reavers", and "bothies", are in Chickering's opinion "a signal of cultural difference", incomprehensible to many readers, and rightly glossed in footnotes. A "deeper difficulty" in Heaney's use of two "different Englishes" is that it is "bad cultural and linguistic history", ignoring the shaping of language variants by social forces; he comments that Heaney knew exactly that his name "Seamus" meant that he was an Ulster Catholic, and concludes that Heaney wanted "Heaneywulf ... to be seen as a poem by Seamus Heaney ... more than as a translation from the Old English, despite his assertions to the contrary." To create his own Romance myth, Chickering writes, Heaney pulls "thole" from his memory as King Arthur pulled the Sword from the Stone.

The philologist and Tolkien scholar Tom Shippey wrote that, with its inclusion in The Norton Anthology, a set text for the mandatory introductory course in English for all American undergraduates, Heaney's was "the poem now, for probably two generations". Shippey noted the opening "So", commenting that if "Right" is the "English English" for hwaet, then there were two folk narratives in Heaneywulf, one personal and one academic; and that if Heaney thought that his dialect somehow "preserves a native purity" lost in other dialects, that was a delusion. He observed also Heaney's intention to be "foursquare", and analysed some passages for this quality, concluding that the Anglo-Saxon was at once more uncompromising and more open-ended (using the subjunctive) than Heaney, treading "much more delicately".

The scholar Nicholas Howe, like Shippey among the few early reviewers familiar with Old English, noted the many translations of Beowulf already in existence, and their difficulties with rendering the text into modern English poetry. He states that Heaney, like Roy Liuzza, has an ear better attuned to modern poetry, and deduces from their versions that alliteration is not so important that sense must be sacrificed, nor awkward kennings invented. He adds that alliteration can be used to cover slack language in the less dramatic parts of the poem; the translator's duty is to use variation to delight the audience's ears: but that requires skill. In that context, the way that some reviewers praised Heaney for directness, and for not sounding like some older versions, might, Howe writes, indicate a betrayal of the Old English of Beowulf and the possibility of rendering variation in modern English. Geoffrey Hill demonstrated this with his Mercian Hymns in 1971, where it serves, "wonderfully adapted", to create a grim but "sly joke" about praise poetry in a modern context. Howe concludes that in the history of approaches to translating Beowulf, Heaney joins William Morris, Edwin Morgan, and Burton Raffel as examples of "high poetic translation", where literal accuracy is sacrificed to the spirit of the original and the presence of the poet-translator; he lists Charles Kennedy, Marijane Osborn, Stanley Greenfield and Liuzza as examples of "verse translation", somewhat faithful to Old English technique, with the translator much less visible; and versions such as John R. Clark Hall and E. Talbot Donaldson as "prose translations", accurate to the narrative and parts of the poetic technique "while sacrificing most of its poetic spirit".

The scholar Thomas McGuire disagrees with Howe's assertion that Heaney's rendering of Beowulf's opening "levels the diction" and "flattens their claim on the audience". In McGuire's view, "when read aloud (as Heaney's translation ought to be read), even a British or North American pronunciation will reproduce some of the elaborate sound system Heaney has erected here". On the other hand, McGuire agrees with Howe that Heaney has reduced the poem's "ceremonial" quality, by splitting the "single grammatical [unit] into two parts", where Liuzza's opening, quoted by Howe, retains the structure of the original:

The opening lines
Beowulf 1–3

Hwæt! We Gardena in geardagum,
þeodcyninga, þrym gefrunon,
hu ða æþelingas ellen fremedon.

Seamus Heaney

So. The Spear-Danes in days gone by
And the kings who ruled them had courage and greatness.
We have heard of those princes' heroic campaigns.

Roy Liuzza

Listen! We have heard of the glory in bygone days
of the folk-kings of the Spear-Danes,
how these noble lords did lofty deeds.

== Sources ==
- Heaney, Seamus (2000) [1999]. Beowulf: A New Verse Translation. New York: Faber and Faber.
- Schulman, Jana (2012). Beowulf at Kalamazoo: essays on translation and performance. Kalamazoo: Medieval Institute Publications. ISBN 978-1-58044-152-0. OCLC 757177299.
