= Beowulf: A Translation and Commentary =

Modern English translation of Beowulf by J. R. R. Tolkien

Beowulf: A Translation and Commentary together with Sellic Spell
- Front cover of the 2014 hardback edition
- Editor: Christopher Tolkien
- Author: Anonymous (Beowulf); J. R. R. Tolkien (Sellic Spell)
- Translator: J. R. R. Tolkien
- Cover artist: J. R. R. Tolkien
- Language: English, Old English
- Subject: Old English poetry
- Genre: Epic poetry
- Published: 22 May 2014
- Publisher: HarperCollins; Houghton Mifflin Harcourt
- Publication place: United Kingdom
- Pages: 425 (Hardback)
- ISBN: 978-0-00-759006-3
- OCLC: 875629841
- Preceded by: The Fall of Arthur
- Followed by: The Story of Kullervo

Beowulf: A Translation and Commentary is a prose translation of the early medieval epic poem Beowulf from Old English to modern English. Translated by J. R. R. Tolkien from 1920 to 1926, it was edited by Tolkien's son Christopher and published posthumously in May 2014 by HarperCollins.

In the poem, Beowulf, a hero of the Geats in Scandinavia, comes to the aid of Hroðgar, the king of the Danes, whose mead hall Heorot has been under attack by a monster known as Grendel. After Beowulf kills him, Grendel's mother attacks the hall and is then also defeated. Victorious, Beowulf goes home to Geatland in Sweden and later becomes king of the Geats. After fifty years have passed, Beowulf defeats a dragon, but is fatally wounded in the battle. After his death, his attendants bury him in a tumulus, a burial mound, in Geatland. The translation is followed by a commentary on the poem that became the base for Tolkien's acclaimed 1936 lecture "Beowulf: The Monsters and the Critics". Furthermore, the book includes Tolkien's previously unpublished "Sellic Spell" and two versions of "The Lay of Beowulf". The translation was welcomed by scholars and critics, who however doubted that it would find much favour with the public or fans of Tolkien's fiction. Michael J. Alexander described it as close to the original in both meaning and clause-ordering, and like the original was intentionally archaic. Michael Drout, who had begun the task of editing Tolkien's Beowulf, was disappointed by the absence of Tolkien's alliterative verse translation of part of the poem. Others noted that the translation makes clear the indebtedness of The Lord of the Rings to Beowulf.

== Background ==
J. R. R. Tolkien specialized in English philology at university and in 1915 graduated with Old Norse as his special subject. (Note: The special subject involves additional work, such as an extended essay.) In 1920, he became Reader in English Language at the University of Leeds, where he claimed credit for raising the number of students of linguistics from five to twenty. He gave courses in Old English heroic verse, history of English, various Old English and Middle English texts, Old and Middle English philology, introductory Germanic philology, Gothic, Old Icelandic, and Medieval Welsh. Having read Beowulf earlier, he began a translation of the poem which he finished in 1926 but never published. Acocella writes that Tolkien may not have had the time to pursue a publication when he moved to Oxford and began to write his novel The Hobbit. Tolkien's biographer Humphrey Carpenter argues that Tolkien was too much of a perfectionist to publish his translation.

Ten years later, however, Tolkien drew upon this work when he gave his famous lecture "Beowulf: The Monsters and the Critics". According to this lecture, the true theme of Beowulf, death and defeat, was being neglected in favour of archaeological and philological disputes on how much of the poem was fictive or true.

== Plot ==
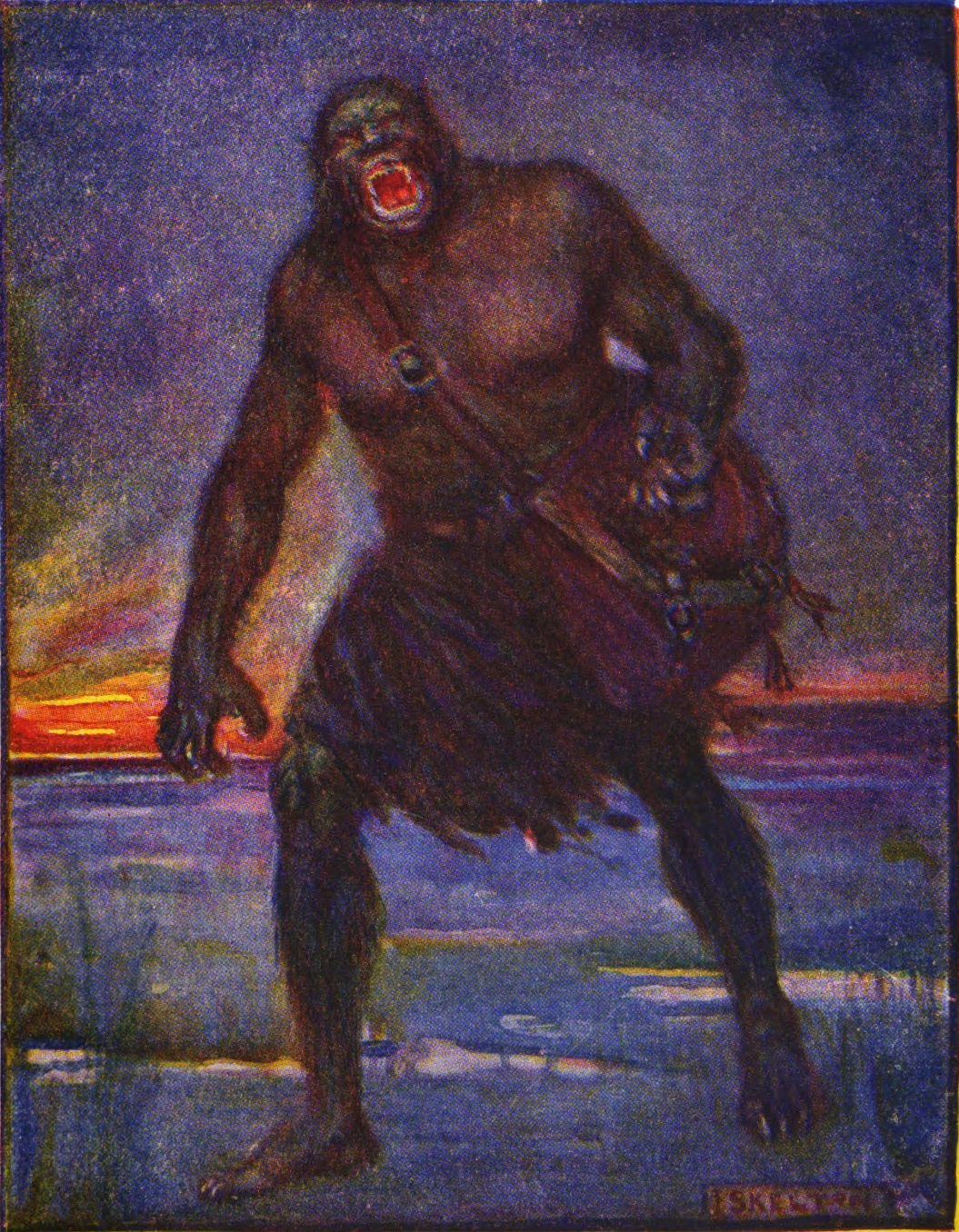
The monster Grendel on his lonely moors. Illustration by J. R. Skelton

Beowulf, a prince of the Geats, and his followers set out to help King Hroðgar of the Danes in his fight against the monster Grendel. Because Grendel hates music and noise, he frequently attacks Hroðgar's mead hall, Heorot, killing the king's men in their sleep. While Beowulf cannot kill Grendel directly in their first encounter, he still wounds him fatally. Afterwards he has to face Grendel's mother, who has come to avenge her son. Beowulf follows her to a cavern beneath a lake where he slays her with a magical sword. There he finds the dying Grendel and decapitates him.

Beowulf returns home to become king of the Geats. After some 50 years, a dragon whose treasure had been stolen from his hoard in a burial mound begins to terrorize Geatland. Beowulf, now in his eighties, tries to fight the dragon but cannot succeed. He follows the dragon to his lair where Beowulf's young relative Wiglaf joins him in the fight. Eventually, Beowulf slays the dragon but is mortally wounded. In the end, his followers bury their king in a mound by the sea.

== Contents ==
The book begins with a preface and an introduction by Christopher Tolkien. The edited translation follows, with J. R. R. Tolkien's line numbers; these do not correspond to the line numbers of the poem as normally printed. The translation is accurate, rhythmic, and often alliterative, but is in prose and does not attempt to preserve the poem's ordering of words or clauses:

Grendel reaches Heorot: Beowulf 710–714
Old English verse

Ðá cóm of móre under misthleoþum
Grendel gongan· godes yrre bær·
mynte se mánscaða manna cynnes
sumne besyrwan in sele þám héan·

Tolkien's prose (580–583)

He came now from the moor under misty fells
Grendel walking. The wrath of God was on him.
Foul thief, he purposed of the race of men
someone to snare within that lofty hall.

Christopher Tolkien provides detailed notes on the places in the translation where the interpretation of the Old English text was in doubt; he then introduces his father's commentary on the translation. The commentary, occupying over 200 pages, provides a detailed picture of how he saw Beowulf, sometimes taking several pages for a short passage of the poem, and giving his interpretation of difficult words or allusions by the poet. The commentary formed the basis of Tolkien's acclaimed 1936 lecture "Beowulf: The Monsters and the Critics".

There follows Tolkien's story "Sellic Spell", with a short introduction and notes by Christopher Tolkien. It represents Tolkien's attempt to reconstruct the folktale underlying the narrative of the first half of Beowulf. The book ends with two versions of Tolkien's "The Lay of Beowulf". The former, subtitled "Beowulf and Grendel", is a poem or song of seven eight-line stanzas about Beowulf's victory over Grendel. The latter is a poem of fifteen eight-line stanzas on the same theme; several of the stanzas, including the first and the last, are almost identical with the first version. There are no illustrations, other than on the dust jacket.

== Publication history ==
The book was first published in 2014 by HarperCollins in London, England and Houghton Mifflin Harcourt in Boston, Massachusetts. HarperCollins reprinted it in 2015 and 2016. Mariner Books of New York published an edition in 2015.

== Reception ==
=== Accuracy over "poetic majesty" ===
Tolkien's translation of Beowulf has been compared to Seamus Heaney's translation from 1999. Joan Acocella writes that since Tolkien was not a professional poet like Heaney, he had to make compromises in translating the original Old English epic. According to Acocella, Heaney's focus on rhyme and alliteration makes him occasionally lose details from the original that remain in Tolkien's prose version. Tolkien's version stays closer to the details and rhythm of the original and extremely close to the original sense of the poem, which has been attributed to Tolkien's scholarly knowledge of Old English, whereas Heaney, on the other hand, succeeded in producing a translation better suited for the modern reader.

The publication caused some controversy among scholars. Beowulf expert and University of Kentucky professor Kevin Kiernan, called it a "travesty", and criticism was also offered by Harvard professor Daniel Donoghue. Kiernan notes that Tolkien disliked his own translation. According to Kiernan, any prose translation of Beowulf inevitably neglects the "poetic majesty" of the original. University of Birmingham lecturer Philippa Semper instead called the translation "captivating" and "a great gift to anyone interested in Beowulf or Tolkien."

=== "Arthurian grandeur" ===
Katy Waldman, reviewing the work for Slate, sets the translation in context, summarizing the poem and mentioning Tolkien's powerful argument for it as a work of art, his 1936 "Beowulf: The Monsters and the Critics". She writes that it is less immediately pleasurable than Seamus Heaney's verse translation. She states that she understands how some may prefer Tolkien's version, with its "Arthurian grandeur". She notes that Tolkien can "do immediacy", praising his dragon: "Now it came blazing, gliding in looped curves, hastening to its fate", reminding her of Smaug in The Hobbit. All the same, in her view, Tolkien's undoubted fidelity to the original sometimes clouds the action, losing the thread of the tale "in a kind of reverent hairsplitting". On the other hand, Waldman finds the commentary admirable, providing context and support: "Tolkien-as-guide is delightful, an irresistibly chatty schoolmaster in the Chaucerian mold", able to complain in precise academic detail about what he considered mistranslations, such as the popular kenning "whale-road" – he renders it "the sea where the whale rides", to avoid, among other traps, the echo of "railroad". She admires Tolkien's passion for Scyld Scefing, who became King Sheave in Tolkien's The Lost Road. Like the sole Beowulf manuscript, Tolkien's handwritten draft of the translation had badly deteriorated and faded, and was almost lost. Waldman ends by "not begrudg[ing] Tolkien his pedantry in the face of the void. ... Hwæt!" (Note: Hwæt is the first word of Beowulf; it is an invitation to the audience to listen in.)

=== Prose, not verse ===
The Tolkien scholar Michael D. C. Drout had begun the project of editing Tolkien's Beowulf, in both prose and poetry, for publication in two volumes, around 2000, but the project was cancelled by the Tolkien Estate, and eventually Christopher Tolkien brought out the present book instead. Drout wrote in his review in Tolkien Studies that "The exclusion of [Tolkien's] alliterative poetic translation from the edition is more puzzling. [That] translation is a well-done piece of poetry, truer to the original in both form and content than any other poetic translation of Beowulf. ...general readers would very likely enjoy the poetic translation more than they will the prose."

Ethan Gilsdorf comments in The New York Times that Tolkien had been skeptical about putting Beowulf into modern English, and had written in his 1940 essay "On Translating Beowulf" that turning the poem "into 'plain prose' could be an 'abuse'." Gilsdorf continues, "But he did it anyway"; Tolkien remarked that the result "was 'hardly to my liking'." Jeremy Noel Tod, writing for The Daily Telegraph, noted that all the same, the translation illustrates how indebted The Lord of the Rings is to the Old English poem.

Beowulf sets out for Heorot (Note: A further comparison is given at Translating Beowulf#Archaic or modern.)
Old English verse
Beowulf 210-216

Fyrst forð gewát· flota wæs on ýðum
bát under beorge· beornas gearwe
on stefn stigon· stréamas wundon
sund wið sande· secgas bǽron
on bearm nacan beorhte frætwe,
gúðsearo geatolic; guman út scufon,
weras on wilsíð, wudu bundenne.

Tolkien's verse in
"On Translating Beowulf"

Time passed away. On the tide floated
under bank their boat. In her bows mounted
brave men blithely. Breakers turning
spurned the shingle. Splendid armour
they bore aboard, in her bosom piling
well-forged weapons, then away thrust her
to voyage gladly, valiant-timbered.

Tolkien's prose (171–173) in
Beowulf: A Translation and Commentary

Time passed on. Afloat upon the waves
was the boat beneath the cliffs. Eagerly the warriors
mounted the prow, and the streaming seas
swirled upon the sand. Men-at-arms
bore to the bosom of the ship their bright harness,
their cunning gear of war; they then, men on a glad voyage,
thrust her forth with her well-joined timbers.

=== Christians might prefer ancient paganism to modern life ===
Jerry Salyer, reviewing the book for The Catholic World Report, commented that "Tolkien believed northern paganism to be in certain respects more compatible with Christianity than is the Mediterranean variety, insofar as northern myths allude to a grand conflict whereby gods and men fight together against inhuman monsters", and that "At the least, we can say that there is more reality to Old English folklore than in the perverse fantasies by which Americans now live." Salyer positions the monster Grendel as "a representative of Cain, that first [biblical] killer", specially enraged by the Christian singing in the Hrothgar's hall, Heorot. In Salyer's view, the modern West may be "twisted and bleak", but if Tolkien is still publishing books long after his death, it cannot be all bad, and the "forgotten pagan legacy" remains important for Christianity.

=== Faithful, rhythmic, but not easy ===
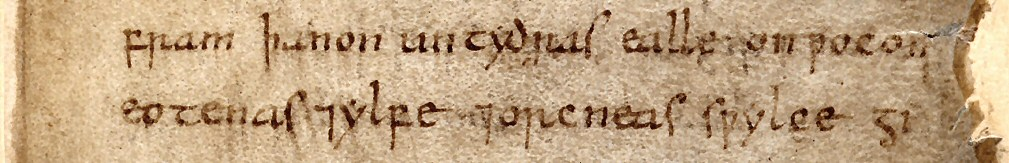
Michael J. Alexander notes that although Beowulf, with its eotenas ond ylfe ond orcneas, inspired Tolkien to create ents, elves, and orcs in his Middle-earth books, the translation may not be an easy read for his fans.

Michael J. Alexander, author of a verse translation of Beowulf, reviewed Tolkien's version for The Guardian. He notes that The Lord of the Rings derives its orcs and its Riders of Rohan "directly from the poem", though the One Ring has a different source. He writes that he does not know what Tolkien's "fiction fans" will make of the book, as "some [parts of it] are drier than others". Since Alexander had, many years earlier, been shown a part of Tolkien's verse translation of about one fifth of Beowulf by Christopher Tolkien, he had expected the rendering to be in verse; he notes that both the Tolkien verse fragment, and Alexander's own version, imitated the form of the original, "stimulated by the example of Ezra Pound's version of [the Old English poem] 'The Seafarer'". In contrast, Tolkien's prose version "sticks as closely as possible to the meaning and clause-order of the original". In Alexander's view, it "has great accuracy and a sense of rhythm", casting its own spell despite its archaism and "striking inversions of word-order"; he notes that the original, too, was intentionally archaic. Alexander writes that only readers familiar with the original will see the "felicities" of Tolkien's rendering, and the commentary, too, may work best on knowledgeable readers.

== See also ==
- List of adaptations of Beowulf
- List of translations of Beowulf
