= Scop =

Poet as represented in Old English poetry

Old English poetry such as Beowulf was composed for performance; it is widely supposed that this meant it was chanted by a scop to musical accompaniment. Illustration by Joseph Ratcliffe Skelton, c. 1910

A scop (/ʃɒp/ or /skɒp/) was a poet as represented in Old English poetry. The scop is the Old English counterpart of the Old Norse skald, with the important difference that "skald" was applied to historical persons, and scop is used, for the most part, to designate oral poets within Old English literature. Very little is known about scops, and their historical existence is questioned by some scholars.

== Functions ==
The scop, like the similar gleeman, was a reciter of poetry. The scop, however, was typically attached to a court on a relatively permanent basis. There, he most likely received rich gifts for his performances. The performances often featured the recitation of recognisable texts such as the "old pagan legends of the Germanic tribes." However, the scop's duties also included composing his own poetry in different situations, the eulogizing of his master. While some scops moved from court to court, they were (generally speaking) less nomadic than the gleemen and had positions of greater security.

== Etymology ==
Old English scop and its cognate Old High German scoph, scopf, scof (glossing poeta and vates; also poema) may be related to the verb scapan "to create, form" (Old Norse skapa, Old High German scaffan; Modern English shape), from Proto-Germanic *skapiz "form, order" (from a Proto-Indo-European *(s)kep- "cut, hack"), perfectly parallel to the notion of craftsmanship expressed by the Greek poetēs itself; Gerhard Köbler suggests that the West Germanic word may indeed be a calque of Latin poeta.

== Scop, scopf, and relationship to scold ==
While skop became English scoff, the Old Norse skald lives on in a Modern English word of a similarly deprecating meaning, scold. There is a homonymous Old High German scopf meaning "abuse, derision" (Old Norse skop, meaning "mocking, scolding", whence scoff), a third meaning "tuft of hair", and yet another meaning "barn" (cognate to English shop). They may all derive from a Proto-Germanic *skupa.

The association with jesting or mocking was, however, strong in Old High German. There was a skopfari glossing both poeta and comicus and a skopfliod glossing canticum rusticum et ineptum and psalmus plebeius. Skopfsang, on the other hand, is of a higher register, glossing poema, poesis, tragoedia. The words involving jesting are derived from another root, Proto-Indo-European *skeub- "push, thrust", related to English shove, shuffle, and the Oxford English Dictionary favours association of scop with that root. The question cannot be decided formally since the Proto-Germanic forms coincided in zero grade, and by the time of the surviving sources (from the late 8th century), the association with both roots may have influenced the word for several centuries.

== Literary fiction or reality ==
The scholar of literature Seth Lerer suggests that "What we have come to think of as the inherently 'oral' quality of Old English Poetry ... [may] be a literary fiction of its own." Scholars of Early English have different opinions on whether the Anglo-Saxon oral poet ever really existed. Much of the poetry that survives does have an oral quality to it, but some scholars argue that it is a trait carried over from an earlier Germanic period. If, as some critics believe, the idea of the Anglo-Saxon oral poet is based on the Old Norse Skald, it can be seen as a link to the heroic past of the Germanic peoples. There is no proof that the "scop" existed, and it could be a literary device allowing poetry to give an impression of orality and performance. This poet figure recurs throughout the literature of the period, whether real or not. Examples are the poems Widsith and Deor, in the Exeter Book, which draw on the idea of the mead-hall poet of the heroic age and, along with the anonymous heroic poem Beowulf express some of the strongest poetic connections to oral culture in the literature of the period.

The scholar and translator of Old English poetry Michael Alexander, introducing his 1966 book of The Earliest English Poems, treats the scop as a reality within an oral tradition. He writes that since all the material is traditional, the oral poet achieves mastery of alliterative verse when the use of descriptive half-line formulae has become "instinctive"; at that point he can compose "with and through the form rather than simply in it". At that point, in Alexander's view, the scop "becomes invisible, and metre becomes rhythm".

The nature of the scop in Beowulf is addressed by another scholar-translator, Hugh Magennis, in his book Translating Beowulf. He discusses the poem's lines 867–874, which describe, in his prose gloss, "a man ... mindful of songs, who remembered a multitude of stories from the whole range of ancient traditions, found new words, properly bound together". He notes that this offers "an image of the poetic tradition in which Beowulf participates", an oral culture: but that "in fact this narrator and this audience are [in this instance] a fiction", because when the Beowulf text is read out, the narrator is absent. So, while the poem feels like a scop's "oral utterance .. using the traditional medium of heroic poetry", it is actually "a literate work, which offers a meditation on its [centuries old] heroic world rather than itself coming directly from such a world".

== See also ==
- Grendel novel
- Sumbel
- Bard
- Bragi
- Makar
