= On Translating Beowulf =

1940 essay by J. R. R. Tolkien

- Essay by J. R. R. Tolkien
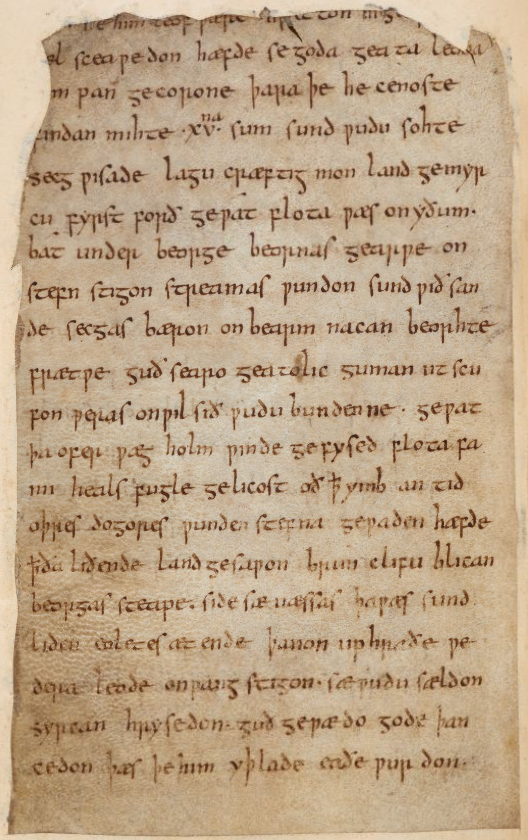
- Folio 137r of the Beowulf manuscript, lines 205–228: Tolkien used lines 210–228 in "On Translating Beowulf". Line 210, Fyrst forð gewát flota wæs on ýðum, is on the fifth line of the folio (not counting the broken line at the top).
- Country: United Kingdom
- Language: English
- Genre: Essay
- Foreword to: Beowulf and the Finnesburg Fragment (3rd ed)
- Author: John Richard Clark Hall
- Editor: Charles Leslie Wrenn
- Publisher: George Allen & Unwin
- Pub. date: 1940

"On Translating Beowulf" is an essay by J. R. R. Tolkien which discusses the difficulties faced by anyone attempting to translate the Old English heroic–elegiac poem Beowulf into modern English. It was first published in 1940 as a preface contributed by Tolkien to a translation of Old English poetry; it was first published as an essay under its current name in the 1983 collection The Monsters and the Critics, and Other Essays.

In the essay, Tolkien explains the difficulty of translating individual words from Old English, noting that a word like eacen ('large', 'strong', 'supernaturally powerful') cannot readily be translated by the same word in each case. He notes the problem of translating poetic kennings such as sundwudu ('flood-timber', i.e. 'ship') and that the language chosen by the poet was already archaic at that moment. He explains that such terms had echoes and connotations of another world, an "unrecapturable magic".

The essay describes Old English metre, with each line in two opposed halves. The stressed syllables in each half contained alliterating sounds in six possible patterns, which Tolkien illustrates using modern English. Rhyme is used only for special effects, such as to imitate waves beating on a shore. The essay ends with the observation that the whole poem is itself in two opposed halves, covering "Youth + Age; he rose – fell."

Critics note that Tolkien attempted and sometimes failed to follow the rules he laid down in the essay in his own alliterative verse, in his own translations, and indeed in the poetry in his narrative fiction such as The Lord of the Rings.

== Literary context ==
J. R. R. Tolkien contributed "On Translating Beowulf" as a preface entitled "Prefatory Remarks on Prose Translation of 'Beowulf'" to C. L. Wrenn's 1940 revision of John R. Clark Hall's book Beowulf and the Finnesburg Fragment, A Translation into Modern English Prose, which had first been published in 1901. Tolkien, the Rawlinson and Bosworth Professor of Anglo-Saxon at the University of Oxford, had himself attempted a prose translation of Beowulf, but abandoned it, dissatisfied; it was published posthumously, edited by his son Christopher Tolkien as Beowulf: A Translation and Commentary in 2014.

The preface was published under the title "On Translating Beowulf" in 1983 (and in subsequent editions), as one of the essays in The Monsters and the Critics, and Other Essays, also edited by Christopher Tolkien.

== Essay ==
The essay is divided into the following sections (which are arranged hierarchically but not numbered in the original):

=== On Translation and Words ===
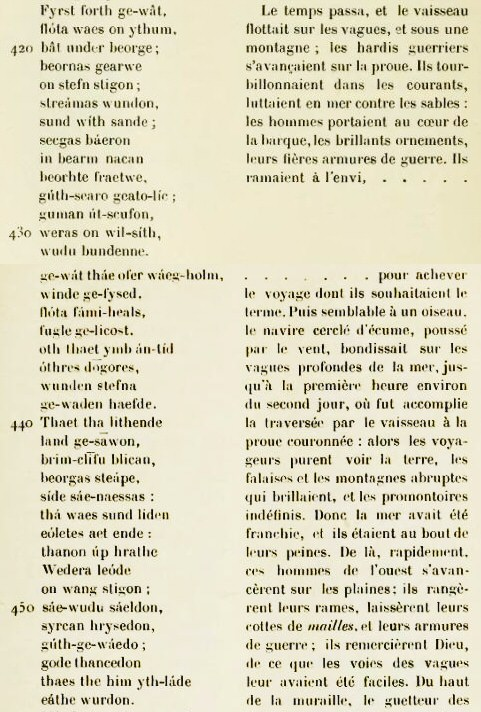
A challenge to any translator: Beowulf parallel text of lines 210–228, with the inaccurate (Note: To quote from W.J. Sedgefield on Pierquin's performance: "But it is the French prose version which is the least satisfactory part of M. Pierquin's performance. To substantiate this statement we append a few of the choicer specimens culled from the first seven hundred lines, which will, we trust, dispense us from specifying errors in other parts of the book. In 1. 27 felahror is 'tout caduc'; 1. 32 hringedstefna is 'à la proue sonore' (!); 1. 70 æfre gefrunon is 'célebréraient à jamais'; 1. 226 sæwudu sældon, syrcan hrysedon is 'ils rangèrent leurs rames, laissèrent leurs cottes de mailles' [near '450' in image]; 1. 231 beran ofer bolcan is 'suspendre aux mats'; 1. 258 se yldesta is 'le plus hautain'; 1. 312 hildedeor is 'le guetteur au cheval de guerre'; 1. 330 irenþreat is 'faisceau hérisse d'airain'; 1. 333 fætte scyldas is 'boucliers épais' (!); 1. 434 for his wonhydum is 'grace à sa peau maudite' (!); 1. 440 þær gelyfan sceal is 'c'est là que dormira'; 1. 489 on sæl meoto is 'mange avec joie' (!).") French of Hubert Pierquin, 1912

Tolkien comments on the risk of using a translation as a substitute for study with grammar and dictionary, calling it an abuse, and writing that

On the strength of a nodding acquaintance of this sort (it may be supposed), one famous critic informed his public that Beowulf was 'only small beer'. Yet if beer at all, it is a drink dark and bitter: a solemn funeral-ale with the taste of death.

He notes that a readable translation cannot always translate an Old English word the same way; thus eacen is rendered 'stalwart', 'broad', 'huge', and 'mighty', correctly in each case to fit the context, but losing the clue to the word's special meaning, "not 'large' but 'enlarged'". The word implies, in fact, supernatural or superhuman power, like Beowulf's gift from God of "thirtyfold strength". And this is just an example, Tolkien points out, of a minor challenge to the translator.

A second issue (in his view) is the compactness of Old English words, which often have no modern equivalents, and phrases which are "inevitably weakened even in prose by transference to our looser modern language".

Another problem is posed by the kennings, which Tolkien calls "poetical devices, ...descriptive compounds". He gives the example of sundwudu ('flood-timber') for 'ship'; some phrase like 'wave-borne timbers' is "an attempt to unfold, at the risk of dissipating it, the briefly flashed picture".

Tolkien mocks "oddities" like "ten timorous trothbreakers together" (for Beowulf line 2846, in Clark Hall's unrevised version) as "reminiscent of the 'two tired toads that tried to trot to Tutbury'". (Note: Hugh Magennis notes that Wrenn's revision of Clark Hall, on which Tolkien was commenting, wisely emends the "egregious oddit[y] in diction" to "ten cowardly traitors together".) He does not approve, either, of choosing needlessly colloquial words: "Too often notables, visitors and subalterns appeared instead of the more fitting, and indeed more literally accurate, counsellors, strangers, and young knights."

Further, he points out that the language used by the Beowulf poet was already archaic, and the choice of words was at the time recognisably poetic. Tolkien gives as an example beorn, which meant both 'bear' and 'warrior', but only in heroic poetry could it be used to mean 'man'. He advises the translator to prefer 'striking' and 'smiting', and to avoid 'hitting' and 'whacking'. But on the other hand, he criticises William Morris for using the dead and unintelligible 'leeds' for OE leode ('freemen', 'people'; cf German leute), even if antiquarians feel that the word ought to have survived. Tolkien does not accept the etymological fallacy either: mod means 'courage', not 'mood'; burg is 'stronghold', not 'borough', even though the modern word derives from the old one.

Some terms present special problems; the Beowulf poet uses at least ten synonyms for the word 'man', from wer (as in werewolf, a man-wolf) and beorn to leod and mann; Tolkien writes that in heroic verse there were over 25 terms that could at a stretch be used to mean 'man', including words like eorl (a nobleman, like 'earl'); cniht (a young man, like 'knight'); ðegn (a servant, like 'thain'); or wiga (a warrior). He argues that the translator need not avoid words from the Middle Ages that might suggest the age of chivalry: better the world of King Arthur than "Red Indians", and in the case of words for armour and weapons, there is no choice.

In the case of compound words, Tolkien observes that the translator has to

hesitate between simply naming the thing denoted (so 'harp' 1065, for gomen-wudu 'play-wood'), and resolving the combination into a phrase. The former method retains the compactness of the original but loses its colour; the latter retains the colour, but even if it does not falsify or exaggerate it, it loosens and weakens the texture. Choice between the evils will vary with occasions."

Tolkien concludes the section by warning the translator that even the most well-worn kennings had not lost their meaning and connotations. Whereas, he argues, the Old English word hlaford, meaning 'lord' (which derives from it) was all that was left of the antique hlafweard ('loaf-guard'; the word originally meant 'bread-keeper') in daily speech, the poetic phrases used in verse retained echoes of another world:

He who in those days said and who heard flæschama 'flesh-raiment', ban-hus 'bone-house', hreðer-loca 'heart-prison', thought of the soul shut in the body, as the frail body itself is trammelled in armour, or as a bird in a narrow cage, or steam pent in a cauldron. ... The poet who spoke these words saw in his thought the brave men of old walking under the vault of heaven upon the island earth [middangeard] beleaguered by the Shoreless Seas [garsecg] and the outer darkness, enduring with stern courage the brief days of life [læne lif], until the hour of fate [metodsceaft] when all things should perish, leoht and lif samod. But he did not say all this fully or explicitly. And therein lies the unrecapturable magic of ancient English verse for those who have ears to hear: profound feeling, and poignant vision, filled with the beauty and mortality of the world, are aroused by brief phrases, light touches, short words resounding like harp-strings sharply plucked.

=== On Metre ===
Tolkien states that he is going to give an account of Old English metre using modern English, bringing out "the ancestral kinship of the two languages, as well as the differences between them".

==== Metre ====
Tolkien explains that each line of Old English poetry had two opposed halves, groups of words which had six possible patterns of stress, such as 'falling-falling', like

kníghts in | ármour.
4...........1 4....1

where 4 means a full lift (maximum stress) and 1 is the lowest dip in stress.

A clashing pattern would be like

on hígh | móuntains.
1.......4 4.........1

Tolkien emphasises that these are still the patterns found everywhere in modern English; poetry differs from prose, he argues, in that the poet clears away everything else, so "these patterns stand opposed to each other".

Tolkien then provides "a free version of Beowulf 210–228 in this metre. (Note: This, just 19 lines of verse in the metrical style of Old English, contrasts with the prose of his posthumously published Beowulf: A Translation and Commentary, which he found unsatisfactory. The verse was still in his view 'free', an inexact translation, though it captures rhythm, structure (though he felt that even that was loosened), and much of the meaning. The prose only had the merit of covering the whole poem.) The passage should be read slowly, but naturally: that is with the stresses and tones required solely by the sense." The first few lines, which as Tolkien says are a free (non-literal) translation of the Old English, run:

Old English		Tolkien's version
Fyrst forð gewát·	flota wæs on ýðum	Tíme pàssed a|wáy.	On the tíde | flóated
bát under beorge·	beornas gearwe	under bánk | their bóat.	In her bóws | móunted
on stefn stigon		bráve mèn | blíthely.

==== Variations ====
In this section Tolkien describes variations on the basic patterns. For example, dips (between lifts) were usually monosyllabic, but the number of syllables was not limited by Old English metre, so a series of weak syllables was permitted in a half-line. Other variations included breaking a lift into two syllables, the first short but stressed, the second weak, with for instance 'vĕssel' in place of 'boat'.

==== Alliteration ====
Tolkien states that calling Old English verse alliterative is a misnomer for two reasons. Firstly it is not fundamental to the metre, which would work without it. Secondly, it does not depend on letters, as in modern English alliteration, but on sounds. Old English alliteration, then, is an "agreement of the stressed elements in beginning with the same consonant, or in beginning with no consonant." Further, all words starting with any stressed vowel are considered to alliterate: he gives the example of 'old' alliterating with 'eager'.

===== Arrangement =====
Tolkien lays down three rules of Old English alliteration. "One full lift in each half-line must alliterate." In the second half-line, only the first lift may alliterate: the second must not. In the first half-line, both lifts can alliterate; the stronger one must do so. He notes that these rules force the second half-line to have its stronger lift first, so lines tend to fall away at the end, contrasting with a "rise in intensity" at the start of the next line.

===== Function =====
Tolkien states that "The main metrical function of alliteration is to link the two separate and balanced patterns together into a complete line", so it has to be as early in the second half-line as possible. It also quickens and relieves heavy patterns (which had double alliteration).

Rhyme is used only "gratuitously, and for special effects". Here he gives an example from Beowulf itself, lines 212–213: stréamas wundon || sund wið sande ('waves wound || sea against sand'), where wundon actually rhymes (internally) with sund. Tolkien explains: "[here] the special effect (breakers are beating on the shore) may be regarded as deliberate." His version of this captures the rhyme and the alliteration, as well as the meaning:

Old English		Tolkien's version
	stréamas wundon		Bréakers | túrning
sund wið sande		spúrned the | shíngle.

Tolkien ends the essay with an analysis of lines 210–228 of Beowulf, providing the original text, marked up with stresses and his metrical patterns for each half-line, as well as a literal translation with poetical words underlined. He notes that there are three words for boat and for wave, five for men, four for sea: in each case some are poetical, some normal.

He notes that sentences generally stop in the middle of a line, so "sense-break and metrical break are usually opposed". He notes too that significant elements in second half-lines are often "caught up and re-echoed or elaborated", giving a characteristic 'parallelism' to Beowulf. This is seen, he argues, not just in such small details, but in the parallel arrangement of narrative, descriptive and speech passages; in the use of separate passages describing incidents of strife between Swedes and Geats; and at the largest scale, in the fact that the whole poem

itself is like a line of its own verse written large, a balance of two great blocks, A + B; or like two of its parallel sentences with a single subject but no expressed conjunction. Youth + Age; he rose – fell. It may not be, at large or in detail, fluid or musical, but it is strong to stand: tough builder's work of true stone.

== Reception ==
Mark F. Hall, examining Tolkien's own use of alliterative verse, writes that Tolkien notes that "the Beowulf poet likely was consciously using archaic and literary words", and compares this to Tolkien's own practice in poems such as "The Lay of the Children of Húrin", where, Hall thinks, Tolkien's words could be applied to his own verse: "Its manner and conventions, and its metre, are unlike those of modern English verse. Also it is preserved fragmentarily and by chance, and has only in recent times been redeciphered and interpreted, without the aid of any tradition or gloss". Hall further comments that in 'Lays of Beleriand', Tolkien failed to heed his own warning against archaism, as he uses the word "weird" archaically to mean 'fate' (OE 'wyrd'), and speculates that this may have been a reaction against the "rigidity and formality of translating authentic Anglo-Saxon literature."

The Green Man Review comments that Tolkien's "emphasis as a translator was on selecting the word that best fit the tone of the poem. He defends the Beowulf poet's use of high sounding language that was anachronistic even in [the poet's] time. He also uses the works of earlier translators of Beowulf to give hilarious examples of what to avoid when translating an ancient text." The reviewer concludes that together with "The Monsters and the Critics", the essays are "strangely prescient. With a little tweaking, they could easily serve as a defense of The Lord of the Rings against charges that its high sounding language was at variance with the 'juvenile' plot."

The fantasy and science fiction author Alexa Chipman writes that while Tolkien was "firmly against any prose translation of Beowulf, as it is, at heart, a poem", he agreed that "if one is trying to read the original, having a translation of it handy can sometimes be of assistance". She recalls her own Beowulf studies with "a huge stack of dictionary and grammar books", and draws attention to Tolkien's comment that "Perhaps the most important function of any translation used by a student is to provide not a model for imitation, but an exercise for correction."

The same comment, on the function of any translation, is cited by Hugh Magennis in his book Translating Beowulf: Modern Versions in English Verse, along with Tolkien's opening remark that translating a poem into "plain prose", "a work of skilled and close-wrought metre (to say no more) needs defence." Magennis writes that Tolkien "goes on to provide such a defence" by insisting that "Clark Hall" was offered not to enable people to judge the original poem or to substitute for it, but "to provide an aid to study". He also cites Tolkien's insistence that "the Modern English of prose Beowulf translations should be 'harmonious' and should avoid 'colloquialism and false modernity'." Magennis argues that

This conviction provides the rationale for an elevated register incorporating archaizing features, such as he finds in Wrenn's 'Clark Hall': 'If you wish to translate, not rewrite Beowulf', declares Tolkien, 'your language must be literary and traditional: not because it is now a long while since the poem was made, or because it speaks of things that have since become ancient; but because the diction of Beowulf was poetical, archaic, artificial (if you will), in the day that the poem was made.' Here Tolkien does argue for literary correspondence between source and translation: the translation is doing more than conveying (to revert to an earlier quotation from Tolkien) 'the matter of the poem, and furnishing the professional student with the material and guidance necessary for the early stages of his study of the original'; it is doing so in an appropriate style that suggests qualities of the Old English.

The scholar Philip Mitchell comments that "The entire essay is worth serious study" and notes that among other points made by Tolkien, "Anglo-Saxon verse is not attempting to offer puzzles but an aesthetic of compression in a slow meter of balance."

In his thesis, Peter Grybauskas writes that Tolkien is preoccupied with "structural juxtapositions" in "Beowulf: The Monsters and the Critics" and "On Translating Beowulf". In these essays, Grybauskas argues, Tolkien talks about concepts of balance and opposition, and indeed ends the essay on translation with a synecdoche, a "structural vision of the whole capable of being glimpsed in the smallest part" in the passage (quoted above) where Tolkien talks about the "two great blocks, A + B". He points out that Tolkien makes use of the concept in the composition of his fictional work The Lord of the Rings.

The translator Ross Smith comments that while Tolkien was cautious about publishing his translations of Beowulf, "he was quite willing to explain the approach that in his opinion should be taken towards such a monolithic task". Smith points out that, unlike publishing a prose or verse translation, explaining his translation criteria did not expose Tolkien to aesthetic criticism. Smith remarks that Tolkien is "somewhat disdainful" of Clark Hall's version, such things being useful as study-guides and little else; putting Old English poetry into modern English prose inevitably creates something "dull and flat", so Tolkien much preferred versions that tried to preserve the original's rhyme and metre. Smith notes that the same opinion can be found in Tolkien's essay "Sir Gawain and the Green Knight".

== See also ==
- Nineteen Ways of Looking at Wang Wei
- Translating The Lord of the Rings

== Bibliography ==
- Tolkien, J. R. R. (1997). The Monsters and the Critics. HarperCollins. ISBN 0-261-10263-X.
