= Hugh Magennis =

Hugh Magennis may be:

- Hugh Magennis (scholar), a scholar of Anglo-Saxon culture and poetry, especially Beowulf
- Hugh Magennis (MP), a 16th century nobleman, member of the Magennis family
