= Michael J. Alexander =

British translator, poet, academic and broadcaster (1941–2023)

Michael Joseph Alexander (21 May 1941 – 5 November 2023) was a British translator, poet, academic and broadcaster. He held the Berry Chair of English Literature at the University of St Andrews until his retirement in 2003. He is best known for his translations of Beowulf and other Anglo-Saxon poems into modern English verse.

Alexander was educated at Downside School, read English at Oxford University, then spent a year in France and in Italy, attending the University of Perugia. He then spent some years working in the publishing industry in London, interrupted by attending Princeton University. Before taking up his post at St. Andrews he was a lecturer at the University of Stirling.

For many years he was a member of the Scottish team in Radio 4's Round Britain Quiz show.

Alexander died on 5 November 2023, at the age of 82.

== Beowulf translation ==
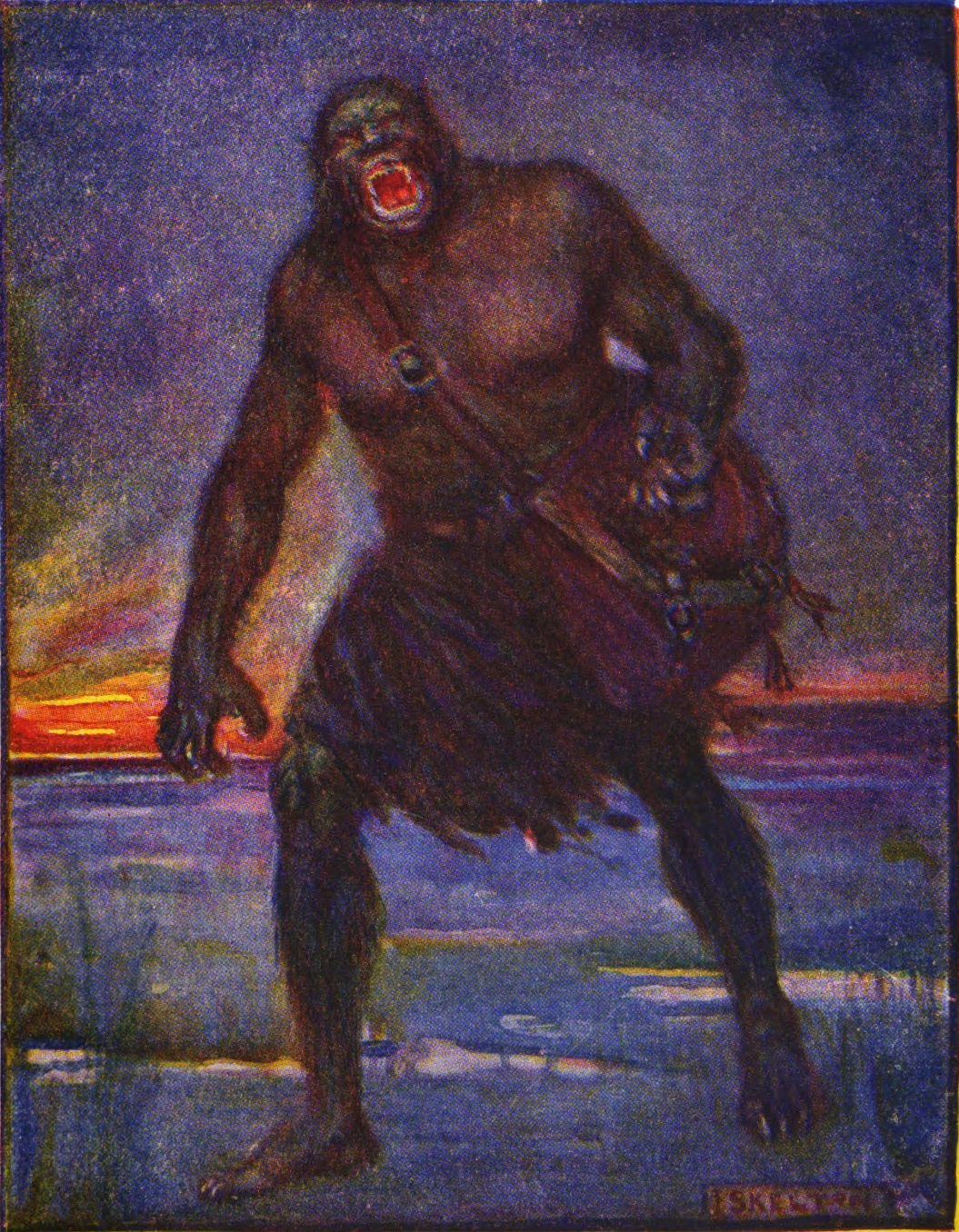
Grendel by J. R. Skelton, 1908

Alexander stated that his verse translation of Beowulf imitated the form of the original, "stimulated by the example of Ezra Pound's version of [the Old English poem] 'The Seafarer'". The scholar Hugh Magennis calls Alexander's translation "accessible but not reductive", notes that it sold "hundreds of thousands" of copies and that it was liked by both students and teachers, and devotes a whole chapter of his book on translating Beowulf to it.

Grendel reaches Heorot: Beowulf 710–714
Old English verse

Ðá cóm of móre | under misthleoþum
Grendel gongan· | godes yrre bær·
mynte se mánscaða | manna cynnes
sumne besyrwan | in sele þám héan·

Alexander's verse

Down off the moorlands' twisting fells came
Grendel stalking; God's brand was on him.
The spoiler meant to snatch away
from the high hall some of human race.

== Works ==
Criticism, scholarship, educational

- The Poetic Achievement of Ezra Pound (1979)
- York Notes on Geoffrey Chaucer's "Prologue to the Canterbury Tales" (1999, with Mary Alexander)
- A History Of English Literature (2000, 2007, 2013)
- A History of Old English Literature (2002)
- Mediaevalism: The Middle Ages in Modern England (2007)
- Reading Shakespeare (2013)

Poetry

- Twelve Poems (1978)

Editions

- Beowulf: A Glossed Text (1995, revised 2000)

Translations

- The Earliest English Poems (1966, revised 1977, 1991)
- Beowulf: A Verse Translation (1973, revised 2001)
- Old English Riddles from the Exeter Book (1980, revised 2007)
