= Burton Raffel =

American writer, poet and academic (1928–2015)

- Born: April 27, 1928; New York City, New York
- Died: September 29, 2015 (aged 87); Lafayette, Louisiana
- Occupations: Writer, translator
- Writing career
- Notable work: Beowulf translation

Burton Nathan Raffel (April 27, 1928 – September 29, 2015) was an American writer, translator, poet and professor. He is best known for his vigorous translation of Beowulf, still widely used in universities, colleges and high schools. Other important translations include Miguel de Cervantes' Don Quixote, Poems and Prose from the Old English, The Voice of the Night: Complete Poetry and Prose of Chairil Anwar, The Essential Horace, Rabelais' Gargantua and Pantagruel and Dante's The Divine Comedy.

== Biography ==
Raffel was born in New York City in 1928. An alumnus of James Madison High School in Brooklyn, New York (1944), Raffel was educated at Brooklyn College (B.A., 1948), Ohio State University (M.A., 1949), and Yale Law School (J.D., 1958). As a Ford Foundation fellow, Raffel taught English in Makassar, Indonesia, from 1953 to 1955. Following the completion of his legal studies and admission to the New York State Bar in 1959, Raffel practiced law as an associate at Milbank, Tweed, Hadley & McCloy before deciding that he was not suited to practice law. Between 1960 and 1963, he served as founding editor of Foundation News, a trade journal published by the Council on Foundations.

He taught at Brooklyn College (lecturer in English, 1950–51), Stony Brook University (instructor of English, 1964–65; assistant professor of English, 1965–66), the University at Buffalo (associate professor of English, 1966–68), the University of Haifa (visiting professor of English, 1968–69), the University of Texas at Austin (visiting professor of English, 1969–70; professor of English and classics and chair of the graduate program in comparative literature, 1970–71), the Ontario College of Art (senior tutor, 1971–72), York University, Toronto (visiting professor of humanities, 1972–75), Emory University (visiting professor, spring 1974) and the University of Denver (professor of English, 1975–89).

From 1989 until his death, he held the chair in Humanities at the University of Louisiana at Lafayette, ultimately retiring from active service as distinguished professor emeritus of arts and humanities and professor emeritus of English in 2003.

Raffel died on September 29, 2015, at the age of 87.

== Translations ==
He translated many poems, including the Anglo-Saxon epic Beowulf, poems by Horace, and Gargantua and Pantagruel by François Rabelais. In 1964, Raffel recorded an album along with Robert P. Creed, on Folkways Records entitled Lyrics from the Old English. In 1996, he published his translation of Miguel de Cervantes' Don Quixote, which has been acclaimed for making Cervantes more accessible to the modern generation. In 2006, Yale University Press published his new translation of the Nibelungenlied. Among his many edited and translated publications are Poems and Prose from the Old English, and Chrétien de Troyes' Cligès, Lancelot, the Knight of the Cart, Perceval, the Story of the Grail, Erec and Enide, and Yvain, the Knight of the Lion.

Raffel worked with Yale University Press and Harold Bloom on a series of 14 annotated Shakespeare plays. In 2008 the Modern Library published his new translation of Geoffrey Chaucer's The Canterbury Tales.

Raffel's main contribution to translation theory was the principle of "syntactic tracking", which he championed in a monograph published in 1994. According to this theory, a good translation of a prose literary text should track the syntax of the original element-by-element, never joining sentences where the original separated them, never splitting a long sentence, never rearranging the order of ideas. The accuracy of tracking is measured syntactically by counting punctuation marks: the best translation will be the one which comes closest to the original in a statistical analysis of commas, colons and full stops. Raffel claimed that those translators who heed the syntax also make the best lexical choices, so that tracking becomes a measure not only of syntactic accuracy but of translating skills per se. This principle has since been applied in scholarly studies of translations of classical and modern works.

=== Beowulf translation ===
Raffel's 1963 Beowulf has been described by Hugh Magennis as "an extremely free imitative verse." Magennis calls it highly accessible and readable, using alliteration lightly, and creating a "vivid and exciting narrative concerned with heroic exploits ... in a way that [the modern reader] can understand and appreciate. Clarity, logic and progression are hallmarks of this treatment of narrative in Raffel's translation, producing a satisfying impression of narrative connectedness".

Beowulf 229–235

þā of wealle geseah | weard Scildinga,
sē þe holmclifu | healdan scolde,
beran ofer bolcan | beorhte randas,
fyrdsearu fūslicu; | hine fyrwyt bræc
mōdgehygdum, | hwæt þā men wǣron.
Gewāt him þā tō waroðe | wicge rīdan
þegn Hrōðgāres, | ...

Raffel's 1963 verse

High on a wall a Danish watcher
Patrolling along the cliffs saw
The travelers crossing to the shore, their shields
Raised and shining; he came riding down,
Hrothgar's lieutenant, spurring his horse,
Needing to know why they'd landed, these men
in armor.

Roy Liuzza's 2013 verse

When from the wall the Scyldings' watchman,
whose duty it was to watch the sea-cliffs,
saw them bear down the gangplank bright shields,
ready battle-gear, he was bursting with curiosity
in his mind to know who these men were.
This thane of Hrothgar rode his horse
down to the shore, ...

== Literary production ==
Over the years he published numerous volumes of poetry; however, only one remains in print: Beethoven in Denver. Beethoven describes what happens when the dead composer visits Denver, Colorado, in the late 1970s. Also set in Colorado was the Raffel-scripted film, The Legend of Alfred Packer, the first film version of the story of Alfred Packer.

== Bibliography ==
=== Translations ===
- Beowulf: A New Translation with an Introduction by Burton Raffel, 1963, Mentor Books/New American Library
- Introduction to Poetry, 1971, Mentor Books/New American Library
- The Red and the Black, 2006, Modern Library
- Sir Gawain and the Green Knight (New York: New American Library [Signet Classics], 2009) ISBN 978-0451531193. Translated with a preface by Burton Raffel.

=== Poetry ===
- "An Autumnal", poem, The Paris Review 157 (2000–2001)
- "The Crucial Importance of Elections” and "Age Wars", poems, in The Carolina Quarterly 53.2 (2001)
- "Sino-Japanese Relations", "One Plank Will Do", "Perfect Prescription", "Paradise Lost, Book 3, 912", "The Return of Borrowed Books", and "Looking at Pictures of the Lodz Ghetto", poems, in The Paris Review 156
- "Freshman Decomposition", in Palo Alto Review, Fall 2001

=== Research ===
- "The Genetics of Speech", in Western Humanities Review, Fall 2001
- "Shakespeare's Sonnets: Touchstone of the English Lyric Tradition", in Explorations in Renaissance Culture, Spring 2001
- Review of Czeslaw Milosz, Milosz's ABC's, in The Washington Post Book World, 25 March 2001
- Review of Chitra Banerjee Divakaruni, The Mistress of Spices, in Bas Bleu, Winter 2001
- "C. J. Cherryh's Fiction", in The Literary Review 44.3 (2001)
- "Three Prize-Winning Poets", in The Literary Review 44.4 (2001)
- "Beethoven, Monet, Technology and Us", in The Pushcart Prize xxvi (2002)
