= E. Talbot Donaldson =

Scholar of medieval English literature

- At Yale University
- Born: 18 March 1910; Bethlehem, Pennsylvania
- Died: 13 April 1987 (aged 77); Bloomington, Indiana
- Education: Harvard University
- Occupation: Medievalist
- Writing career
- Notable works: Beowulf, Chaucer's poetry

Ethelbert Talbot Donaldson (18 March 1910–13 April 1987) was a scholar of medieval English literature, known for his 1966 translation of Beowulf and his writings on Chaucer's poetry.

== Biography ==
Ethelbert Talbot Donaldson was born on 18 March 1910 in Bethlehem, Pennsylvania. He was educated at Harvard University, gaining his BA in 1932. He began his career by teaching languages at the Kent School in Connecticut. He was awarded a fellowship at Yale University in 1942, rising to become the George E. Bodman Professor of English there. During the Second World War he served in the United States Air Force, rising through the ranks from private to captain. He returned repeatedly to Yale, with periods away teaching at University College London, King's College London, Columbia University, and the University of Michigan. In 1974, he and his wife Judith joined the staff of Indiana University; he became a Distinguished Professor of English there, retiring in 1980.

Donaldson wrote a large number of books and research papers on medieval English literature, especially on Chaucer's poetry. Students of literature such as Bonnie Wheeler admired his "eloquent" criticism of Chaucer, recognising the poet's "complexity and irony". His work combined not only a mastery of medieval vocabulary, grammar and syntax, but a deep emotional appreciation of the subtlety of medieval poetry. He was perhaps the first critic to see that poets like Chaucer, the Gawain poet and Langland used their narrators as ironic voices to make their poems so complex.

He died on 13 April 1987, leaving his wife and a daughter, Deirdre.

=== Beowulf translation ===
Donaldson is known also for his 1966 prose translation of Beowulf; it was widely read, especially in The Norton Anthology of English Literature, of which he was a founding editor. The scholar Hugh Magennis calls it accurate, "foreignizing" prose, using asyndetic coordination, "somewhat ponderous but ...[with a] dignified tone ... viewed by teachers as dull".

Beowulf 229–234

þā of wealle geseah | weard Scildinga,
sē þe holmclifu | healdan scolde,
beran ofer bolcan | beorhte randas,
fyrdsearu fūslicu; | hine fyrwyt bræc
mōdgehygdum, | hwæt þā men wǣron.

Donaldson's 1966 prose

Then from the wall the Scylding's guard
who should watch over the seacliffs,
saw bright shields borne over the gangway,
armor ready for battle; strong desire stirred in him
to learn what the men were.

Roy Liuzza's 2013 verse

When from the wall the Scyldings' watchman,
whose duty it was to watch the sea-cliffs,
saw them bear down the gangplank bright shields,
ready battle-gear, he was bursting with curiosity
in his mind to know who these men were.

== Awards and distinctions ==
Donaldson was awarded a "rare" two Guggenheim Fellowships and the Haskins Medal. He was elected among many other distinctions as Corresponding Fellow of the British Academy, Fellow in the American Academy of Arts and Sciences, first President of the New Chaucer Society, and President of the Medieval Academy.

== Works ==
- Chaucer's poetry : an anthology for the modern reader. New York : Ronald Press, 1958
- Piers Plowman: the C-text and its poet. New Haven, Yale University Press, 1949
- Speaking of Chaucer
- The Swan at the Well
- Beowulf, 1966
