= A. Diedrich Wackerbarth =

- Born: 30 January 1813; London, England
- Died: 10 June 1884 (aged 71); Uppsala, Sweden
- Education: University of Cambridge
- Occupation: Translator
- Writing career
- Period: Victorian era
- Notable works: Beowulf: An Epic Poem; Lyra Ecclesiastica

Athanasius Francis Diedrich Wackerbarth (30 January 1813 – 10 June 1884) was a translator and hymnwriter, but he is known especially for his 1849 translation of Beowulf. While working at the Astronomical Observatory in Uppsala, Sweden, he published several papers on astronomy.

== Biography ==
=== Early life ===
Francis Diedrich Wackerbarth was born into a German family; his grandfather, George Wackerbarth moved to the East End of London in 1752 and founded a sugar refinery. Francis's father John Henry Wackerbarth took on the refinery; he died in 1818, leaving ten children. Francis Diedrich was chosen to be educated for the Church of England clergy at Laing's school, Clapham, and then at Queens' College, Cambridge. He gained his B.A. in 1835.

=== Career ===
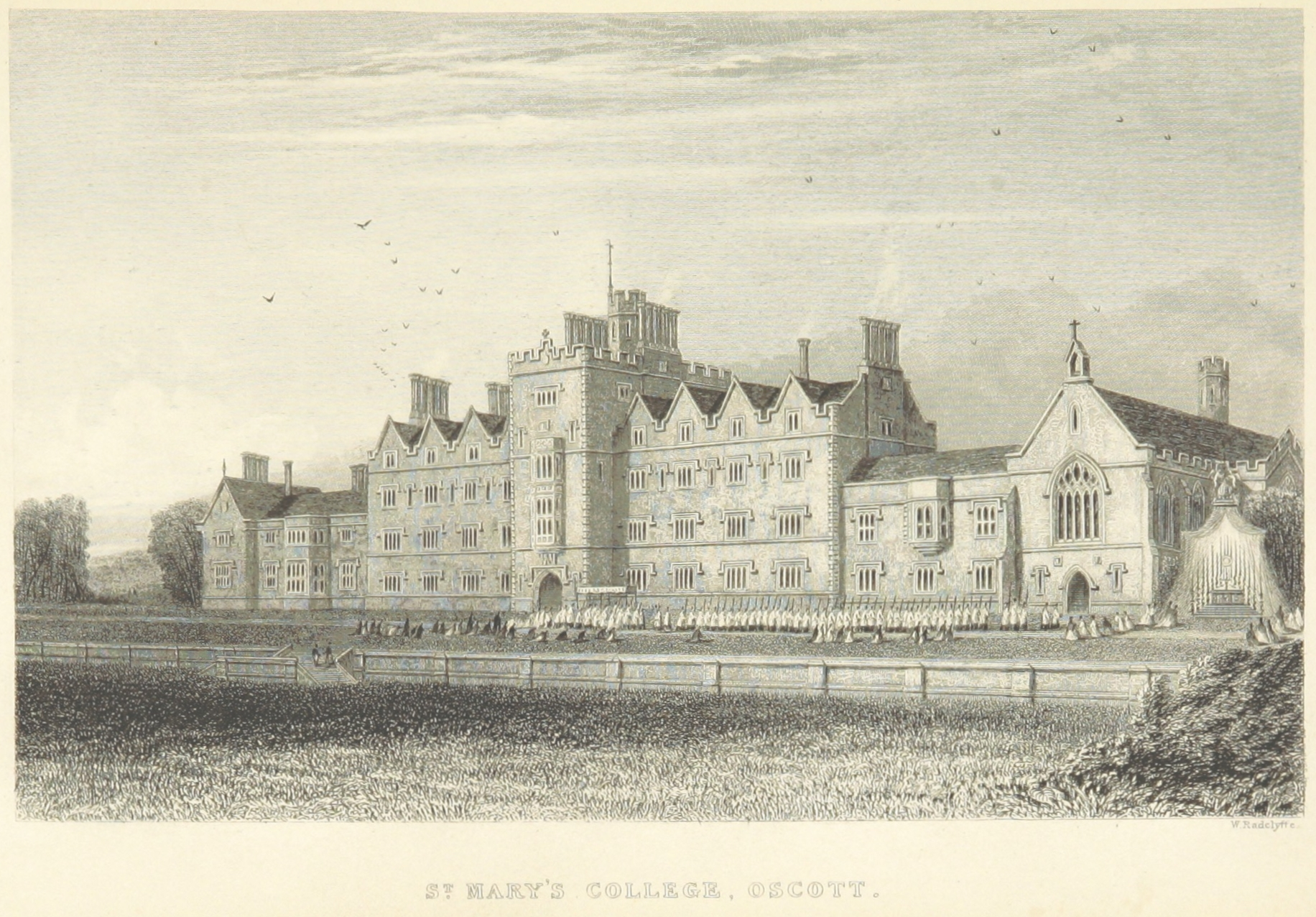
Wackerbarth became professor of Anglo-Saxon at St Mary's College, Oscott, seen here in a contemporary 1839 engraving

In 1837 he became a curate at Peldon, Essex. He then served as a canon in Lichfield Cathedral. While he was still in the Church of England he wrote several books including Music and the Anglo-Saxons in 1837. In 1841 he was converted to Roman Catholicism by Aloysius Gentili, taking the baptismal name Athanasius. He published two series of hymns entitled Lyra Ecclesiastica in 1842 and 1843, including a "Hymn to Our Lady" and Prose on the Conception of Our Ladye. He remained concerned with Catholicism all his life, in 1870 corresponding with Cardinal Newman on papal infallibility.

Wackerbarth took an interest in astronomy, and was elected as a fellow of the Royal Astronomical Society in 1849. He became professor of Anglo-Saxon at Birmingham's Roman Catholic seminary, St Mary's College, Oscott, and in 1849 published a translation of the epic poem Beowulf.

In 1851 he travelled to Denmark to study Germanic languages, visiting Sweden at the same time, and getting to know the director of the Astronomical Observatory in Uppsala, G. Svanberg. In 1852 he moved to Uppsala, taking the only job available at the Observatory, the poorly-paid role of amanuensis. While there, he published several papers on astronomy. As well as Anglo-Saxon, he learnt Swedish and Icelandic, and biblical languages such as Syriac. In 1858 he became a member of the Swedish Royal Society of Science.

=== Beowulf translation ===
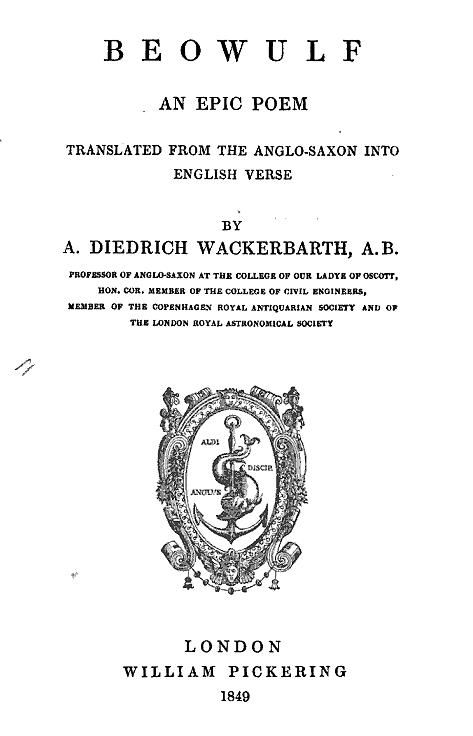
Beowulf: An Epic Poem, 1849

Wackerbarth's translation of Beowulf followed the familiar Victorian era convention of Walter Scott-like romance language with "Liegeman true" and "princely Wight", and using rhyme and modern metre (iambic tetrameters) in place of any attempt to imitate the Old English alliterative metre. Here, the Danish watchman challenges Beowulf and his men as they arrive at Heorot:

Wackerbarth's archaic, but not Anglo-Saxon, diction
Beowulf 331–337

... | þā ðǣr wlonc hæleð
ōretmecgas | æfter æþelum frægn:
'Hwanon ferigeað gē | fǣtte scyldas,
grǣge syrcan, | ond grīmhelmas,
heresceafta hēap ? | Ic eom Hrōðgāres
ār ond ombiht. | Ne seah ic elþēodige
þus manige men | mōdiglīcran.'

Wackerbarth's 1849 romance verse

A Hero proud, of th' valiant Men:
'Whence bring ye solid Shields away.
And Helmets grim, and Hawberks grey.
And Sheaf of spears ? I pray explain,—
I Hróth-gár's Herald am and Thane:—
And Strangers have I never seen
So many of so noble Mien.'

=== Family life ===
In 1859 he married Kristina Lovisa Ekman, daughter of a Swedish priest; they had no children. He died suddenly on 10 June 1884, and was buried in Uppsala.
