= Joseph Ratcliffe Skelton =

English illustrator

Joseph Ratcliffe Skelton (1865–1927), often called J. R. Skelton, was a prolific English illustrator, working in watercolour and oils among other media.

== Life ==
He was born in Newcastle upon Tyne in 1865, son of Thomas Simpson Skelton and Sarah Knott; he was the fourth of six children. His father had been a bookbinder but became a photographer and photographic printer, moving to South Mimms, Middlesex by 1881. He married Violet G. Hastie in Richmond, Surrey in 1912.

He was active as an artist from the late 1880s, working in London. He painted figures, illustrations, and genre scenes. His paintings were exhibited in the Royal Academy of Arts, the Royal Institute of Oil Painters, and the Royal Institute of Painters in Water Colours. He was a member of the Royal West of England Academy. He died in North Kensington, Middlesex on 6 November 1927.

== Gallery ==
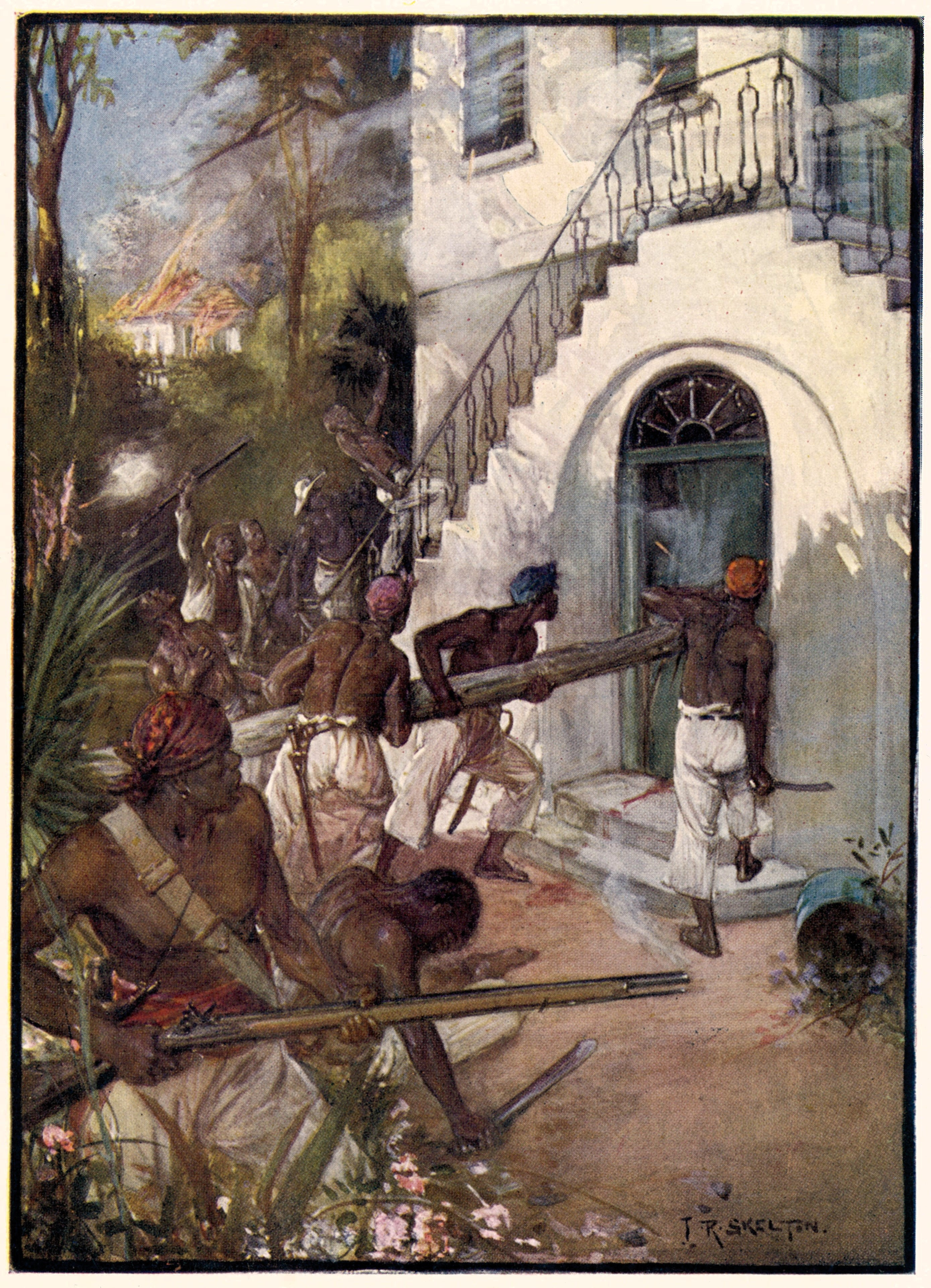
"Great Jamaican Slave Revolt", c. 1908

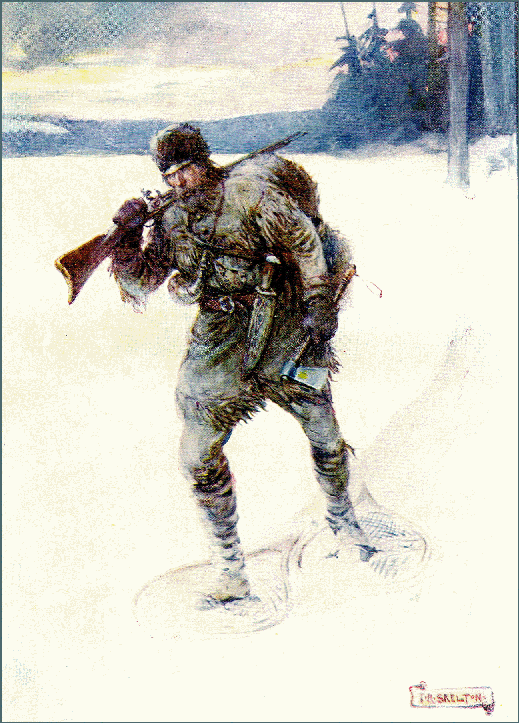
"Alone across the trackless snow" in Our Empire Story, 1908

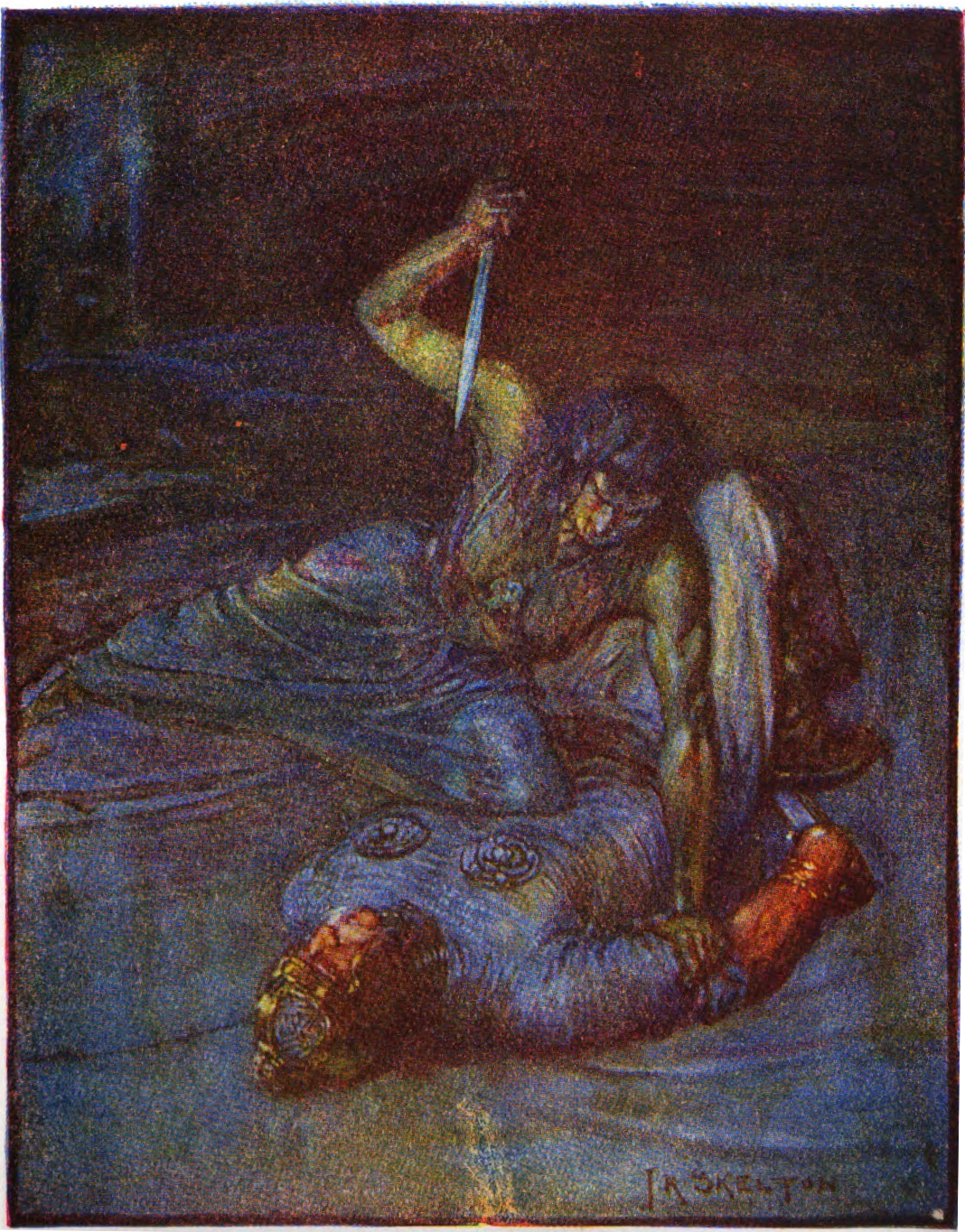
"Water witch trying to stab Beowulf" in Stories of Beowulf, 1908

"A minstrel sings of famous deeds", in English Literature for Boys and Girls, c. 1909
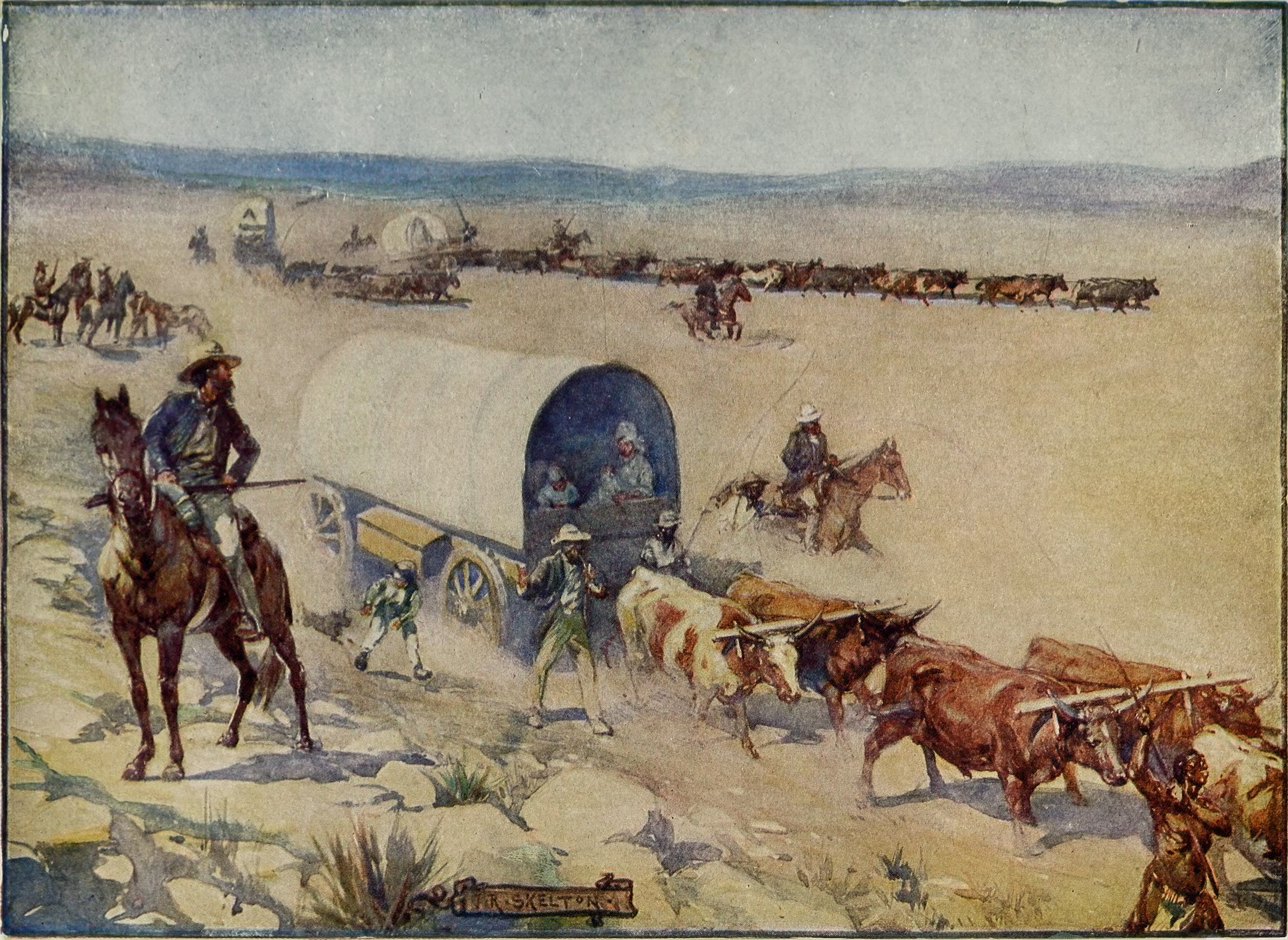
"The Voortrekkers", in South Africa, 1909

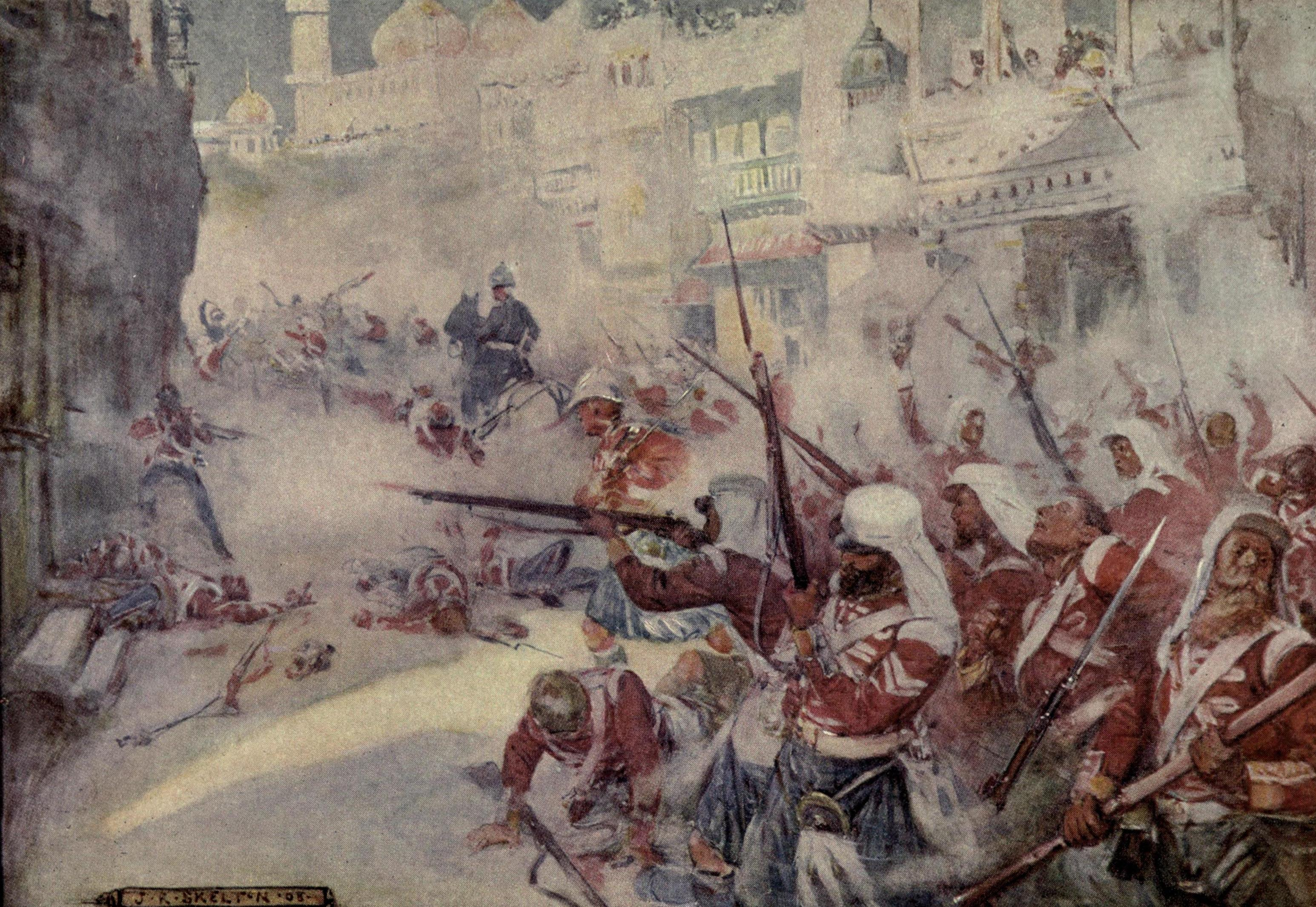
"British soldiers were seen fighting their way through the streets", in India's Story, 1912
