= Roy Liuzza =

American scholar

Roy Michael Liuzza is an American scholar of Old English literature. He is professor emeritus at the University of Tennessee, and has held academic positions at Tulane University, the University of Toronto, and Ohio State University. Liuzza is a former editor of the now discontinued Old English Newsletter.

== Biography ==
Liuzza received a B.A. in History from Northeast Louisiana University (now the University of Louisiana at Monroe) in 1978. He went on to receive a PhD in Medieval Studies from Yale University in 1988. His dissertation "New Wine in Old Bottles: the Twelfth-century Texts of the West-Saxon Gospels" was directed by Fred C. Robinson.

== Works ==
=== Beowulf: A New Verse Translation (1999) ===
In 1999, Liuzza published a translation of Beowulf which was well-received by scholars, with John Niles praising the translation for being "easily accessible to new admirers."
