= Heorot =

Location in the Anglo-Saxon poem Beowulf

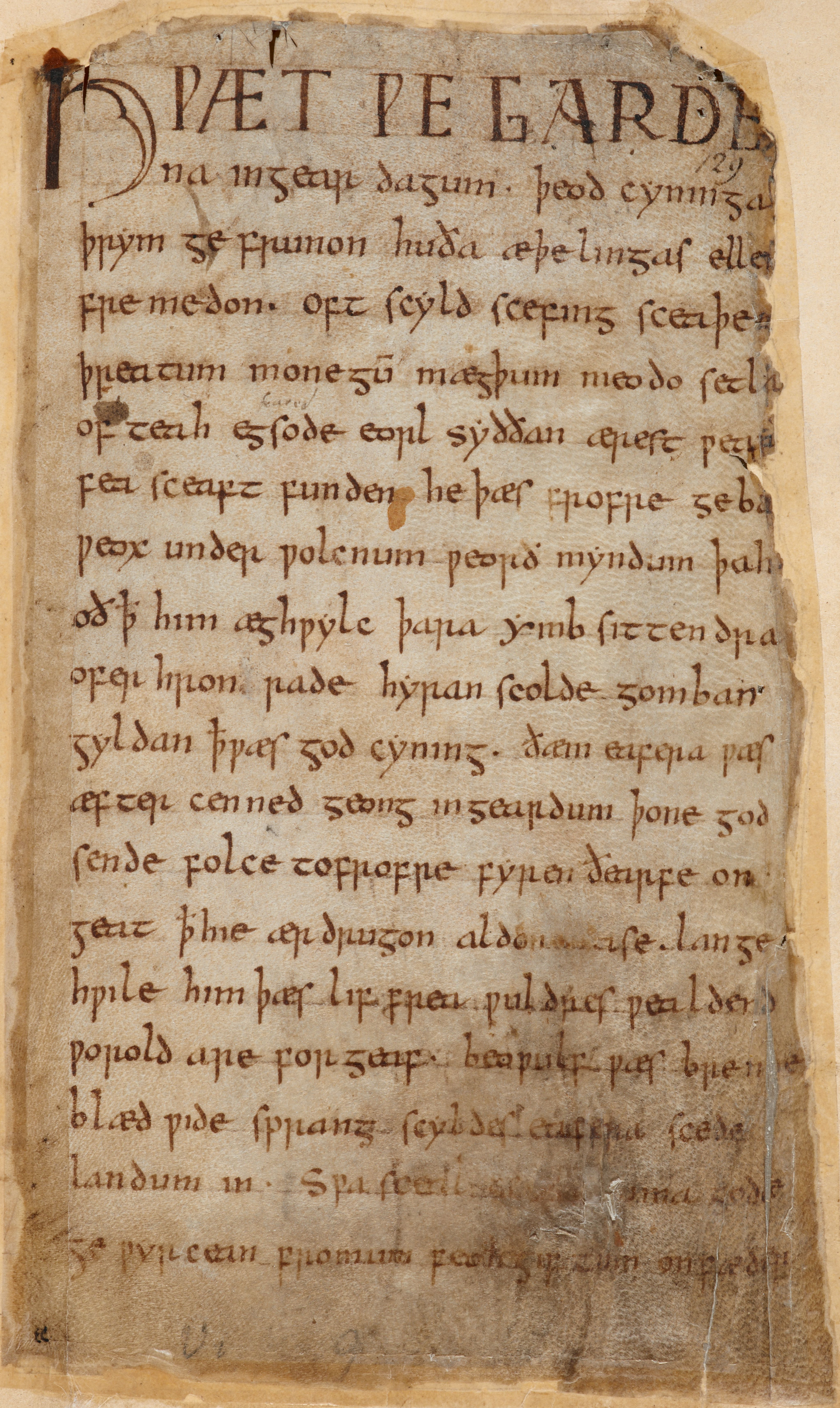
The first page of the Beowulf manuscript

Heorot (Old English 'hart, stag') is a mead-hall and major point of focus in the Anglo-Saxon poem Beowulf. The hall serves as a seat of rule for King Hrothgar, a legendary Danish king. After the monster Grendel slaughters the inhabitants of the hall, the Geatish hero Beowulf defends the royal hall before subsequently defeating him. Later Grendel's mother attacks the inhabitants of the hall, and she too is subsequently defeated by Beowulf.

== Name ==
The name Heorot is the Old English word for a stag. Its use may stem from an association between royalty and stags in Germanic paganism. Archaeologists have unearthed a variety of Anglo-Saxon finds associating stags with royalty. For example, a sceptre or whetstone discovered in mound I of the Anglo-Saxon burial site Sutton Hoo prominently features a standing stag at its top.

In a wider Germanic context, stags appear associated with royalty with some frequency. For example, in Norse mythology—the mythology of the closely related North Germanic peoples—the royal god Freyr (Old Norse: "Lord") wields an antler as a weapon. An alternative name for Freyr is Ing, and the Anglo-Saxons were closely associated with this deity in a variety of contexts (they are, for example, counted among the Ingvaeones, a Latinized Proto-Germanic term meaning "friends of Ing", in Roman senator Tacitus's first century CE Germania and, in Beowulf, the term ingwine, Old English for "friend of Ing", is repeatedly invoked in association with Hrothgar, ruler of Heorot).

According to historian William Chaney:

Whatever the association with the stag or hart with fertility and the new year, with Frey, with dedicated deaths, or with primitive animal-gods cannot now be determined with any certainty. What is certain, however, is that the two stags most prominent from Anglo-Saxon times are both connected with kings, the emblem surmounting the unique 'standard' in the royal cenotaph of Sutton Hoo and the great hall of Heorot in Beowulf.

== Description ==
Map of the Beowulf region, showing the protagonist's voyage to Heorot

The anonymous author of Beowulf praises Heorot as large enough to allow Hrothgar to present Beowulf with a gift of eight horses, each with gold-plate headgear. It functions both as a seat of government and as a residence for the king's thanes (warriors). Heorot symbolizes human civilization and culture, as well as the might of the Danish kings—essentially, all the good things in the world of Beowulf. Its brightness, warmth, and joy contrasts with the darkness of the swamp waters inhabited by Grendel.

== Location ==
=== Harty, Kent ===
Though Heorot is widely considered a literary construction, a theory proposed in 1998 by the archaeologist Paul Wilkinson has suggested that it was based on a hall at Harty on the Isle of Sheppey, which would have been familiar to the anonymous Anglo-Saxon author; Harty was indeed named Heorot in Saxon times. He suggests that the steep shining sea-cliffs of Beowulf would match the pale cliffs of Sheerness on that island, its name meaning "bright headland". An inlet near Harty is named "Land's End", like Beowulf's landing-place on the way to Heorot. The sea-journey from the Rhine to Kent could take the day and a half mentioned in the poem. The road to Heorot is described as a straet, a Roman Road, of which there are none in Scandinavia, but one leads across the Isle of Harty to a Roman settlement, possibly a villa. The toponymist Margaret Gelling observed that the description in Beowulf of Heorot as having a fagne flor, a shining or coloured floor, could "denote the paved or tessellated floor of a Roman building". Finally, the surrounding area was named Schrawynghop in the Middle Ages, schrawa meaning "demons" and hop meaning "land enclosed by marshes", suggestive of Grendel's lonely fens in the poem. The archaeologist Paul Budden acknowledged "the story appealed" to him as a Kentish man, but felt that (as Wilkinson conceded) the subject was "mythology, not archaeology or science".

=== Lejre, Zealand ===
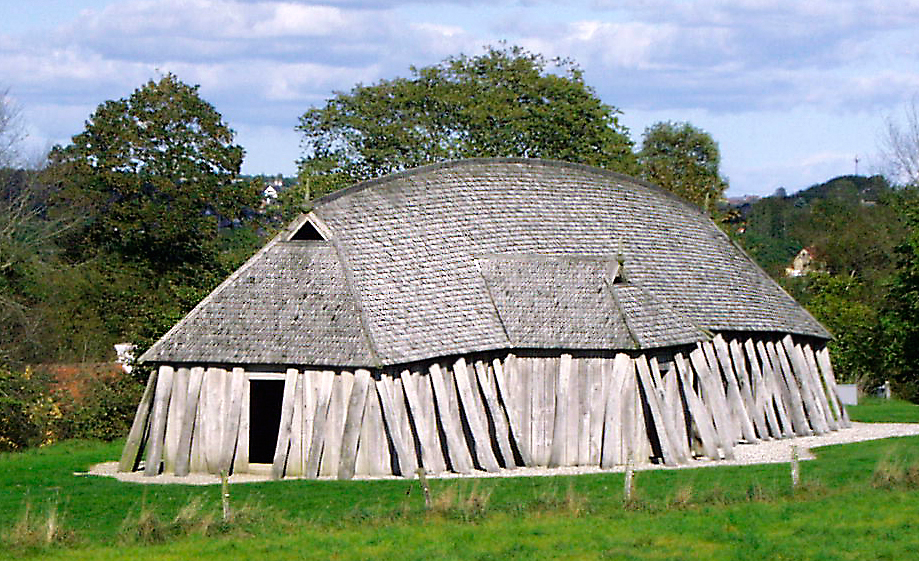
A reconstructed Viking Age longhouse (28.5 metres long) in Fyrkat.

An alternative theory sees Heorot as the accurate, but Anglicised, iteration of a historic hall in the village of Lejre, near Roskilde. Though Heorot does not appear in Scandinavian sources, King Hroðulf's (Hrólfr Kraki) hall is mentioned in Hrólf Kraki's saga as Hleiðargarðr, and located in Lejre. The medieval chroniclers Saxo Grammaticus and Sven Aggesen already suggested that Lejre was the chief residence of the Skjöldung clan (called “Scylding” in the poem). The remains of a Viking hall complex was uncovered southwest of Lejre in 1986–1988 by Tom Christensen of the Roskilde Museum. Wood from the foundation was radiocarbon-dated to about 880. It was later found that this hall was built over an older hall which has been dated to 680. In 2004–2005, Christensen excavated a third hall located just north of the other two. This hall was built in the mid-6th century, all three halls were about 50 meters long.

Fred C. Robinson is also attracted to this identification: "Hrothgar (and later Hrothulf) ruled from a royal settlement whose present location can with fair confidence be fixed as the modern Danish village of Leire, the actual location of Heorot." The role of Lejre in Beowulf is discussed by John Niles and Marijane Osborn in their 2007 Beowulf and Lejre.

== Modern popular culture ==
J. R. R. Tolkien, who compared Heorot to Camelot for its mix of legendary and historical associations, used it as the basis for the Golden Hall of King Théoden, Meduseld, in the land of Rohan.

The Legacy of Heorot is a science fiction novel by American writers Larry Niven, Jerry Pournelle, and Steven Barnes, first published in 1987.

"Heorot" is a short story in The Dresden Files' short story collection Side Jobs.

In Zach Weinersmith's book Bea Wolf (2023), Heorot is paralleled by the treehouse Treeheart.

== See also ==
- Eikþyrnir, the stag that stands atop Odin's afterlife hall Valhalla in Norse myth
- Dáinn, Dvalinn, Duneyrr and Duraþrór, the stags that chew on the cosmological tree Yggdrasil in Norse myth
- Freyr, a Germanic deity who wields an antler as a weapon and whose name means 'lord'
- Valhalla, the afterlife hall of Odin in Norse myth, featuring a stag at its top
