= Hugh Magennis (scholar) =

Hugh Magennis is a scholar of Old English and the author of several books on Anglo-Saxon society and poetry, including especially Beowulf.

== Biography ==
Hugh Magennis gained his bachelor's degree at Queen's University Belfast in 1970. He obtained his master's degree there in 1972 and his PhD also there in 1981. He joined the staff of the university in the 1970s, becoming a full professor, head of its School of English and director of its Institute of Theology. He served from 2004 as chair of the Teachers of Old English in Britain and Ireland, and from 2011 its honorary president.

== Honours and distinctions ==
A festschrift called Saints and Scholars: New Perspectives on Anglo-Saxon Literature and Culture in Honour of Hugh Magennis, was published in 2012. A collection of studies in his honour, entitled "Holy and Unholy Appetites in Anglo-Saxon England" was published the same year in English Studies.

Magennis became a member of the Royal Irish Academy in 2006. He is a Fellow of the English Association.

== Works ==
=== Books ===
- 1994: The Old English Lives of St. Margaret (with M. Clayton and C. mary)
- 2006: Images of community in Old English poetry
- 2009: A companion to Ælfric (with M. Swan)
- 2011: The Cambridge Introduction to Anglo-Saxon Literature
- 2015: Translating Beowulf: Modern Versions in English Verse
