= David Williams =

David or Dave Williams may refer to:

== Architects ==
- David Williams (Australian architect) (1856–1940), South Australian architect
- David L. Williams (architect) (1866–1937), American architect
- David Williams (Alaska architect) (fl. 1930s), architect and community planner in Alaska

== Art ==
- David Dougal Williams (1888–1944), British artist and art teacher
- David E. Williams (1933–1985), American Kiowa-Tonkawa-Kiowa Apache painter from Oklahoma
- David B. Williams (artist) (1947–2009), Canadian Ojibway aboriginal painter and printmaker

== Film, television and radio ==
- David Williams (screenwriter), British television screenwriter
- David Williams, Australian film distributor, 1984 winner of the Raymond Longford Award
- David Walliams (David Edward Williams, born 1971), British comedian and author, especially of children books
- Dave Williams (radio announcer) (born 1971), Australian radio host
- David Williams (producer), American film director and producer for ADV Films
- David L. Williams (film director), British film director

== Law ==
- David Williams (Welsh judge) (died 1613), MP for Brecon, 1584–1589, 1597–1598, and Justice of the King's Bench, 1604–1613
- Sir David Williams (English judge) (born 1964), British High Court judge
- David W. Williams (1910–2000), American federal judge
- Sir David Williams (British legal scholar) (1930–2009), Vice-Chancellor of the University of Cambridge, 1989–1996
- Sir David Williams (arbitrator) (born 1941), New Zealand lawyer, jurist, and international arbitrator
- David C. Williams (inspector general) (born 1947), Inspector General of the U.S. Postal Service
- David Williams (New Zealand legal scholar)

== Military and naval ==
- David Williams (pirate) (fl. 1698–1708), Welsh pirate active near Madagascar
- David Williams (soldier) (1754–1831), one of the captors of British spy John Andre in the American Revolutionary War
- Sir David Williams (Royal Navy officer) (1921–2012), British Royal Navy admiral, Second Sea Lord, 1974–1977
- Taffy Williams (David Hugh Williams, 1933–1996), Welsh mercenary

== Music ==
- Dave "Fat Man" Williams (1920–1982), New Orleans jazz, blues, and rhythm and blues pianist
- David "Happy" Williams (born 1946), Trinidadian jazz double-bassist
- David Williams (guitarist) (1950–2009), American session guitarist
- Dave Williams (singer) (1972–2002), American rock singer
- David Williams (Australian indigenous musician) (born 1983), Aboriginal musician and artist
- David Williams (born 1986), Welsh guitarist in Son of Dork
- David Williams (born 1986), musician formerly with The Dear & Departed
- David Williams, Australian musician with Augie March
- David Williams, head of Shock Records
- David C. Williams (film composer), American film composer

== Politics and government ==
- David Rogerson Williams (1776–1830), governor of South Carolina, 1814–1816
- David Williams (Liberal politician) (1799–1869), British Member of Parliament for Merioneth, 1868–1870
- David G. Williams (1840–1903), member of the Wisconsin legislature
- David Williams (Swansea East MP) (1865–1941), British Labour Member of Parliament for Swansea East, 1922–1940
- David C. Williams (politician), member of the California legislature
- D. J. Williams (politician) (David James Williams, 1897–1972), British miner and checkweighman who became a Labour Party Member of Parliament
- David B. Williams (politician) (1919–1994), American jurist and politician, member of the Massachusetts House of Representatives
- David Williams (trade unionist) (1926–2025), Welsh trade unionist
- Delwyn Williams (David John Delwyn Williams, 1938–2024), British Conservative politician, MP for Montgomeryshire, 1979–1983
- Sir David Williams (Richmond upon Thames politician) (born 1939), Leader of Richmond upon Thames Council, 1983–2001
- David Williams (Australian politician) (born 1941), Australian politician
- David L. Williams (politician) (born 1953), Kentucky judge, president of the Kentucky Senate and 2011 gubernatorial nominee
- Dave Williams (Iowa politician), member of the Iowa House of Representatives
- David Williams (civil servant) (born 1968), British civil servant
- Dave Williams (Colorado politician) (born 1986), member of the Colorado House of Representatives
- David Williams (Stoke-on-Trent North MP), British Labour Member of Parliament for Stoke-on-Trent North from 2024
- David Williams (Canadian politician), member of the Legislative Assembly of British Columbia from 2024

== Religion ==
- David Williams (minister, born 1709) (1709–1784), Welsh independent minister and schoolmaster
- David Williams (philosopher) (1738–1816), Welsh minister, theologian and political polemicist
- David Williams (Oxford academic) (1786–1860), Vice-Chancellor of Oxford University, 1856–1858
- David Archard Williams (fl. 1865–1879), Welsh Anglican priest
- David Williams (priest, born 1841) (1841–1929), Archdeacon of Cardigan, 1903–1928
- David Williams (archdeacon of St Davids) (1847–1920), Welsh Anglican priest
- David Williams (archbishop of Huron) (1853–1931), Welsh-born Anglican Bishop of Huron and later Metropolitan of Ontario
- David Williams (priest, born 1862) (1862–1936), Archdeacon of Cardigan, 1928–1936
- David Williams (Methodist minister, born 1877) (1877–1927), Welsh theologian and minister
- David Rhys Williams (1890–1970), American Unitarian minister
- David Williams (bishop of Truro) (born 1961), Anglican Bishop of Truro

== Science and space ==
=== Geology ===
- David Williams (geologist, born 1792) (1792–1850), English geologist and priest
- David Williams (geologist, born 1898) (1898–1984), British professor of geology
- David Hiram Williams (1812–1848), Welsh geological surveyor

=== Health and medicine ===
- David Innes Williams (1919–2013), British paediatric urologist
- David Williams (Canadian physician), Ontario's Chief Medical Officer of Health
- David R. Williams (scientist) (born 1954), American professor of sociology and public health

=== Space ===
- Dafydd Williams (born 1954), Canadian astronaut
- David Williams (astrochemist) (born 1937), British astrochemist
- David Williams (space administrator) (born 1951), Chief Executive of the UK Space Agency

=== Other scientists ===
- David Williams (mathematician) (born 1938), Welsh mathematician in probability theory
- David Williams (archaeologist) (1949–2017), British archaeologist
- David Williams, co-founder of the journal Biomaterials
- David B. Williams (materials scientist), British materials scientist, former dean of the College of Engineering at Ohio State University

== Sports ==
=== Association football ===
- Dai Williams (footballer) (fl. 1912–1921), also known as Dave Williams, English footballer
- David Williams (footballer, born 1931) (1931–2012), English footballer
- Dave Williams (footballer, born 1942) (1942–2015), Welsh football coach and player for Newport County
- David Williams (footballer, born 1955), Welsh football coach and player for Bristol Rovers
- David Williams (footballer, born 1968), English football goalkeeper
- David Williams (Australian soccer) (born 1988), Australian soccer player

=== Gridiron football ===
- Dave Williams (wide receiver) (1945–2024), American football player: University of Washington, St. Louis Cardinals, San Diego Chargers, Pittsburgh Steelers, Southern California Sun
- Dave Williams (running back) (born 1954), American football player
- David Williams, American football player; see Atlanta Falcons draft history
- David Williams (wide receiver) (born 1963), American football player at the University of Illinois
- David Williams (offensive lineman) (born 1966), American football offensive lineman
- D. J. Williams (tight end) (born 1988), American football tight end
- David Williams (running back) (born 1994), American football running back

=== Australian rules football ===
- David Williams (Australian rules footballer) (born 1961), former Australian rules footballer

=== Baseball ===
- Dave Williams (1900s pitcher) (1881–1918), American baseball pitcher
- David Williams (2000s pitcher) (born 1979), American baseball pitcher

=== Cricket ===
- David Williams (cricketer, born 1948), English cricketer
- David Williams (cricketer, born 1963), West Indian cricketer

=== Rugby league ===
- Dave Williams (rugby league, born 1967), rugby league footballer of the 1990s for Wales, Welsh Students, and South Wales Dragons
- David Williams (rugby league, born 1986), Australian rugby league footballer
- Dave Williams (rugby league, born 1987), rugby league footballer for Harlequins RL

=== Rugby union ===
- David Williams (rugby union, born 1894) (1894–1959), Australian rugby union player
- Dai Williams (rugby union) (1913–1975), South African rugby union player
- David Williams (rugby union, born 1995), English rugby union player

=== Other sports ===
- David Williams, tennis player; see 1929 Wimbledon Championships – Men's Singles
- Dave Williams (basketball) (1913–1983), American basketball player
- Dave Williams (golf coach) (1918–1998), American college golf coach
- Dave Williams (hurdler) (born 1945), American hurdler and long jumper, 1965–1967 All-American for the Washington Huskies track and field team
- Tiger Williams (David Williams, born 1954), Canadian ice hockey player
- David Williams (judoka) (born 1965), American judoka
- David Williams (sailor) (born 1966), British Olympic sailor
- David Williams (ice hockey) (born 1967), American ice hockey player
- David Williams (born 1972) American wrestler better known by the ring name David Young
- David Williams (card game player) (born 1980), American poker player
- David Williams (American cyclist) (born 1988), American cyclist
- David Williams (Canadian cyclist) (born 1994), Canadian cyclist
- David Williams, darts player; see 2011 PDC Under-21 World Championship
- David Williams, golfer; see Atlantic Open
- David Williams, racing driver; see 1982 British Formula One season

== Writers ==
- David John Williams (1885–1970), Welsh-language writer and Welsh nationalist
- David Williams (historian) (1900–1978), Welsh historian
- Gwyn Williams (writer) (David Gwyn Williams, 1904–1990), Welsh poet, novelist, translator and academic
- David Williams (crime writer) (1926–2003), British advertising executive and crime writer
- David Williams (medievalist) (1939–2015), Canadian medieval literature scholar
- David J. Williams (born 1971), American science fiction writer and video game writer
- David Williams (journalist), Australian author and journalist
- David Williams (natural history writer), American natural history writer

== Other people ==
- David Williams (businessman, born 1969), British entrepreneur and founder of Avanti Communications Group plc
- David Williams (coal owner) (1809–1863), Welsh industrialist
- David A. Williams, American president and CEO of the Make-A-Wish Foundation
- David Henry Williams (1819–1897), American railroad surveyor, civil engineer and writer
- David Marshall Williams (1900–1975), American inventor
- Russell Williams (criminal) (David Russell Williams, born 1963), Canadian convicted murderer, rapist, and officer in the Canadian Forces
- Adam the Woo (David Adam Williams, 1974–2025), American YouTuber

== Fictional characters ==
- Dave Williams (Desperate Housewives), a fictional character on the TV series Desperate Housewives
- David Williams, a character in Another Man, Another Chance
- David Williams (The Lost Boys), a character in the Lost Boys franchise

== See also ==
- Davey Williams (disambiguation)
- David William (1926–2010), British/Canadian actor and director
