= List of artistic depictions of Grendel's mother =

Appearances of Grendel's mother in media

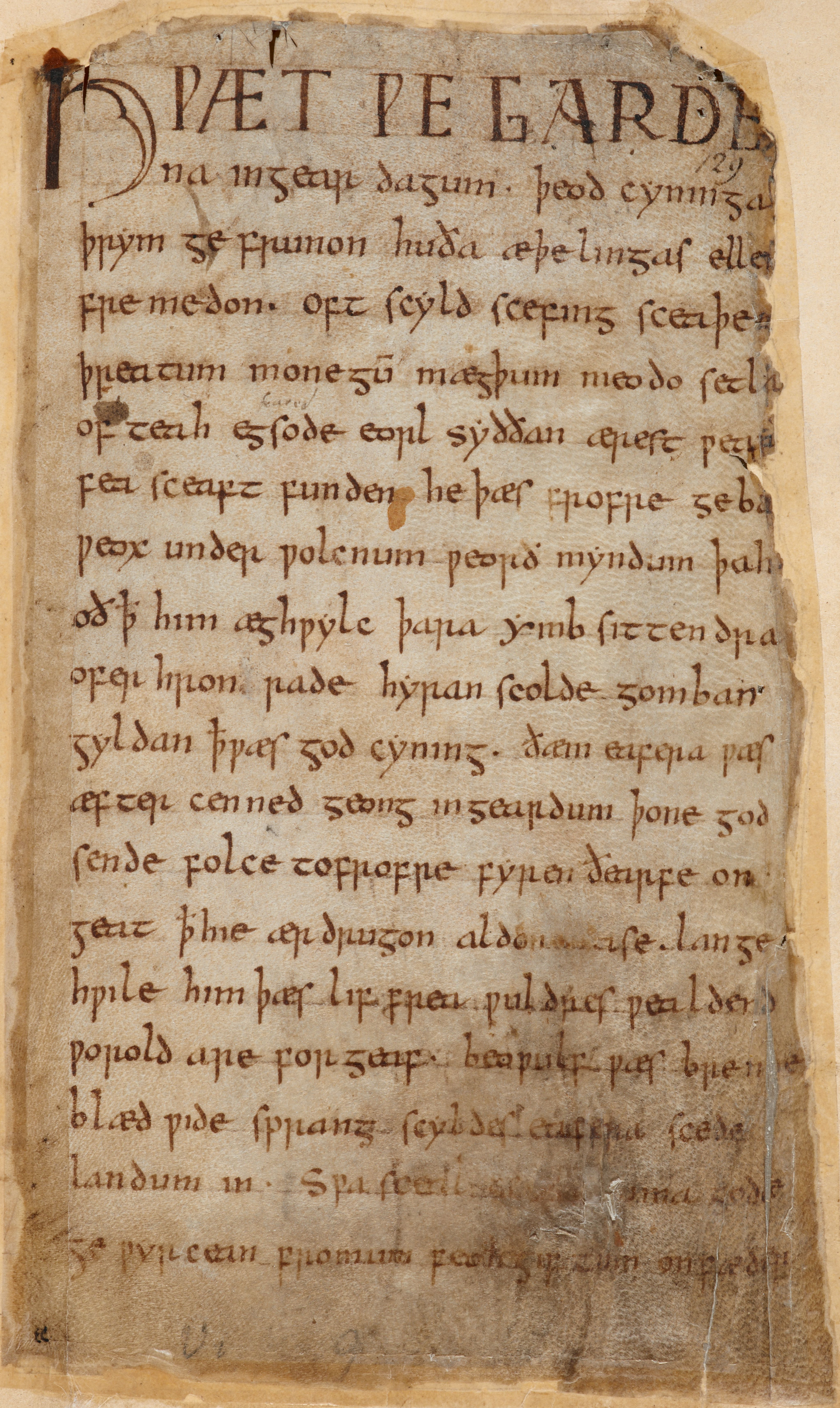
The first page of Beowulf

This list of artistic depictions of Grendel's mother (Old English: Grendles modor) refers to the figure of Grendel's mother. She is one of three antagonists (along with Grendel and the dragon) in the Anglo-Saxon epic poem Beowulf (c. 700-1000 CE); she is never given a name in the text.

Grendel's mother has been adapted in a number of different media, including: film, music, television, literature, graphic novels, and comic books.

== Cinema ==
Grendel's mother, as portrayed by Layla Roberts in 1999's Beowulf

Layla Roberts portrayed Grendel's mother in Beowulf (1999), a fantasy/science fiction retelling directed by Graham Baker. While some of the film remains true to the original poem, other plot elements deviate from the original poem. She is depicted as a beautiful woman able to turn into a multi-limbed devil-like creature. Her true nature is never revealed, but according to herself, she is an ancient being who had originally lived on the castle's lands. She mates with king Hrothgar to produce Grendel, and later tries to seduce Beowulf as well.

A "mother of the Wendol" appeared in The 13th Warrior (1999), directed by John McTiernan. The film is adapted from Eaters of the Dead, a 1976 novel by Michael Crichton. The novel and film are both reworkings of Beowulf which turn Grendel into cannibalistic hominids called "Wendol" (implied though not said definitively to be Neanderthals in the novel). Here Grendel's mother is the matriarch of the Wendol community, and they make effigies of her which are similar to the Venus of Willendorf.

Elva Ósk Ólafsdóttir portrayed Grendel's mother (referred to and billed as the "Sea Hag") in Beowulf & Grendel (2005), directed by Sturla Gunnarsson. Although some of the film remains true to the original poem, other plot elements deviate from it, including a father and a son for Grendel. In the film, while all the males in Grendel's bloodline look relatively human-like, being possibly Neanderthals as in the McTiernan film, his mother is distinctively less human in appearance.

Angelina Jolie portrayed Grendel's mother in Beowulf (2007), directed by Robert Zemeckis. Her portrayal in this cinematic adaptation deviates from the original poem. As with Layla Robert's portrayal eight years prior, Jolie's character is a shapeshifting "seductress". Her true form, which resembles a golden-scaled amphibian-like creature, is only vaguely glimpsed in the film (but a figure sculpt released shows it in full). She seduces Beowulf by appearing to him in the form of a beautiful naked woman, offering to make him the greatest king who ever lived if he will agree to give her a son to replace Grendel. During the exchange, she demonstrates supernatural powers, first magically avoiding a sword strike by Beowulf and later melting his weapon with her fingers. She later gives birth to a dragon who attacks Beowulf's kingdom, and gives Beowulf a final kiss before his ship sinks into the sea. The film ends ambiguously with the implication that she may attempt to seduce Wiglaf.

== Literature ==
Grendel's mother has appeared in a few works of contemporary literature. Perhaps the most well known appearance is in the 1971 John Gardner novel, Grendel. In this retelling of the Beowulf from Grendel's point of view, Grendel describes his mother as "my pale, slightly glowing, fat mother [...] life-bloated, baffled, long-suffering hag. Guilty, she imagines, of some unremembered, perhaps ancestral crime." He further states later in the text, "she gets up on all fours, brushing dry bits of bone from her path, and with a look of terror, rising as if by unnatural power, she hurls herself across the void and buries me in her bristly fur [...] she smells of wild pig and fish."

Grendel's mother appears in Eaters of the Dead by Michael Crichton, as the "mother of the Wendol", hominids attacking and eating Hrothgar's people. She is described as resembling a Venus figurine.

Both Grendel and his mother appear in Neil Gaiman's novella The Monarch of the Glen.

Adrienne Kennedy also used Grendel's Mother as a metaphor in her essay "Grendel and Grendel's Mother".

Grendel and "Grendel's ma" or "Grendel's mum" are also characters in Suniti Namjoshi's 1993 postmodern collection of feminist fairytales, St Suniti and the Dragon. Consisting of non-sequential poetry and prose, St Suniti and the Dragon focuses on the adventures of St. Suniti, a female saint-in-training. During these adventures, St. Suniti has a number of encounters with Grendel and Grendel's ma.

Caitlin R. Kiernan's novelization of the 2007 Robert Zemeckis film Beowulf develops the background of this version of Grendel's mother. In Kiernan's version, she was worshipped as the Germanic fertility goddess Nerthus in ancient times, but she is stated to be not divine and only feigning it for her own safety. Still, she is an ancient and very powerful being that is identified as both a dökkálfar and a jötun.

Susan Signe Morrison adapts the character in her recent novel Grendel's Mother: The Saga of the Wyrd-Wife using "alliterative, lyric prose that evokes the Old English of her source text." In Morrison's text, Grendel's mother is portrayed as being human, washed upon the shores of Denmark. Taken in by a fisherwoman woman and her husband, she is received as a blessing for the child they recently lost and given the name of Brimhild. Morrison's Grendel's mother focuses on a human rather than a supernatural retelling of the classic text, with the character representing an integration between the old ways of the Scandinavian/Germanic tribes, and early Christianity.

== Comics ==
- 1975-1976: Beowulf: Dragon Slayer. Issue 2, by Michael Uslan and Ricardo Villamonte (July 1995). (DC Comics).
- 1984: Beowulf by Jerry Bingham (Jan. 1984) (First Comics).
- 1987: Beowulf by Astrid Anand and Bill Carroll (Tri-Color Printing).
- 2007: Beowulf by Gareth Hinds (Candlewick Press)

== Video games ==
- Grendel's Cave: Grendel's Mother is an AI monster, and secondary objective, after killing Grendel, in the game.
- Skullgirls: Grendel's Mother is a character to the backstory of the pro-wrestler character, Beowulf. After Beowulf kills Grendel in a wrestling match, Grendel's Mother attacked Beowulf but was defeated as well. The backstory was also somewhat based on the actual myth.
- Assassin's Creed: Valhalla: Grendel's mother was trying to defend her mentally disabled son who was afflicted with a strange mold. Eivor killed Grendel, then her when Grendel began killing cattle in the area.

== Music ==
- "Grendel's Mother" is the title of a song on the first LP by The Mountain Goats, Zopilote Machine.
- The song "Grendel" by Leslie Fish is narrated from the perspective of Grendel's mother.

== Television ==
The character appeared in the sixth season of the American fantasy Xena: Warrior Princess. In the show, she is named Grinhilda and portrayed as a Valkyrie. She was Odin's lover and commander of the Valkyries. When Xena entered their lives, she managed to usurp Grinhilda in both positions. In reality, after the power of the Rheingold, Xena stole it and forged it into a ring, in order to gain the powers of a god. When Grinhilda found out, she attempted to stop Xena and managed to obtain the ring. Putting the ring on—in order to gain its powers—she was able to overpower Xena. Unfortunately, because she hadn't forsaken love, the ring took away what she valued most; her humanity and beauty. After turning into a monster, Xena chopped off her ring-wearing finger and locked her up in a mine. During the struggle to lock the mine, Grinhilda was able to take the ring from Xena.

Beowulf: Return to the Shieldlands: The character of Elvina, portrayed by Laura Donnelly, reveals that she is Grendel's mother in the final episode.

== See also ==
- List of artistic depictions of Grendel
