= David M. Williams =

David M. Williams may refer to:

- David Marshall Williams (1900–1975), American designer of the short-stroke piston used in the M1 Carbine
  - Carbine Williams, a 1952 American film starring James Stewart as Williams
- David Williams (rugby union) (c. 1894–c. 1959), Australian rugby union player

== See also ==
- David Williams (disambiguation)
