= List of artistic depictions of Grendel =

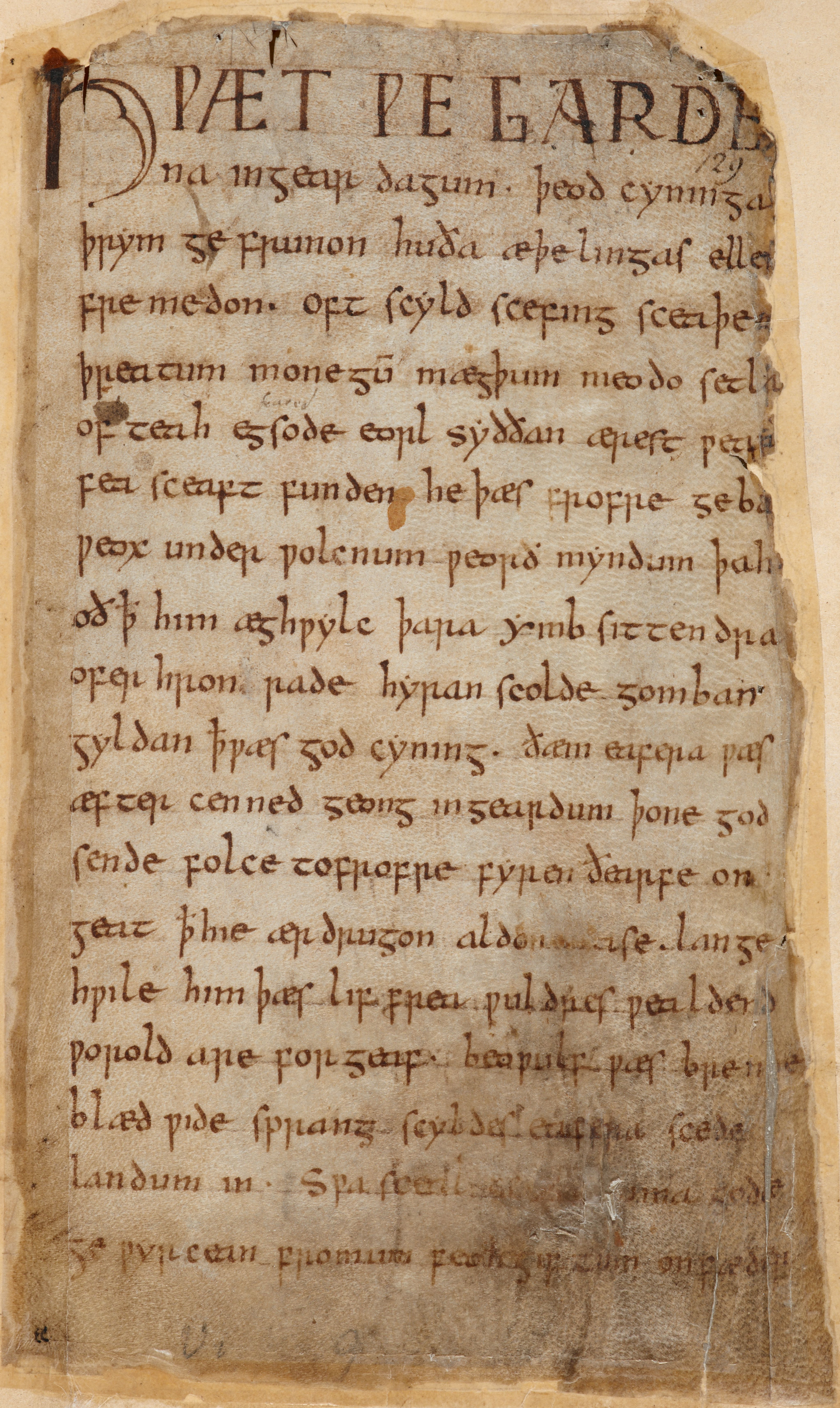
The first page of Beowulf

This list of artistic depictions of Grendel refers to the figure of Grendel. He is one of three antagonists (along with Grendel's mother and the dragon) in the Anglo-Saxon epic poem Beowulf (c. 700–1000 CE).

Grendel has been adapted in a number of different media including film, literature, and graphic/illustrated novels or comic books. He is depicted as either a troll, a ogre or a demon or any demonic grotesque depiction of Grendel.

== Cinema ==
=== 1999 Baker adaptation ===
Vincent Hammond portrayed Grendel in Graham Baker's film Beowulf (1999). Among the artistic liberties taken in this version set in a post-apocalyptic future, Grendel is depicted as an armored creature with jagged fangs and clawed hands and feet, and he's stated to be the son of Hrothgar and he is shown to be capable of rendering himself partially invisible in a Predator-like manner. His manner of death also differs from the original source. As with the poem, Beowulf tears off Grendel's arm during their first battle, though Grendel survives the wound in the film. Beowulf kills Grendel later on by stabbing his stump.

=== 2005 Gunnarsson adaptation ===
The film Beowulf & Grendel (2005) purports to be a more realistic depiction of the legend. Grendel, played by Ingvar Eggert Sigurðsson, is portrayed as a large, Neanderthal-looking primitive man, whom King Hrothgar and his men believe to be a "troll". His mother, referred in the credits as a "sea hag", is portrayed as more inhuman-looking.

=== 2007 Zemeckis adaptation ===
Crispin Glover portrayed Grendel in the Robert Zemeckis film, Beowulf (2007). This version changes elements of the poem by introducing a relationship between Grendel's mother and Hrothgar which results in the birth of Grendel, much like Graham Baker's adaptation eight years prior.

Grendel, as portrayed by Crispin Glover in the 2007 film Beowulf

Grendel is portrayed in the film as a diseased and deformed creature. Described by the film crew as "The embodiment of pain", he was born with a large external eardrum which causes him pain whenever the singing in Heorot echoes in his lair. This weakness is exploited by Beowulf in his battle with the monster. When frightened or weakened, Grendel is shown to shrink in size. When not attacking the Danes, he is shown to be a timid, childlike creature who speaks in Old English in the presence of his mother. During his battle with Beowulf, his arm is severed and he bleeds to death. He's also the older half-brother of the dragon fathered by his killer.

Philosophy professor Stephen T. Asma argued in the December 7 issue of the Chronicle of Higher Education that, "Zemeckis's more tender-minded film version suggests that the people who cast out Grendel are the real monsters. The monster, according to this charity paradigm, is just misunderstood rather than evil. The blame for Grendel's violence is shifted to the humans, who sinned against him earlier and brought the vengeance upon themselves. The only real monsters, in this tradition, are pride and prejudice. In the film, Grendel is even visually altered after his injury to look like an innocent, albeit scaly, little child. In the original Beowulf, the monsters are outcasts because they're bad (just as Cain, their progenitor, was outcast because he killed his brother), but in the newer adaptation of Beowulf the monsters are bad because they're outcasts [...] Contrary to the original Beowulf, the new film wants us to understand and humanize our monsters."

=== Other film adaptations and portrayals ===
Grendel, as shown in Grendel Grendel Grendel

- Grendel Grendel Grendel (1981) is an animated film based on the John Gardner novel, Grendel (1971); the film stars Peter Ustinov as Grendel and is told from the monster's point of view.
- The Wendol are members of a fictional enemy race in the film The 13th Warrior (1999)
- Grendel (2007) - a made-for-television movie on the Sci Fi Channel (United States).
- Christian Boeving portrayed Grendel in Beowulf: Prince of the Geats (2008).
- In the film How to Train Your Dragon (2010), the Red Death is called "the bride of Grendel" by Tuffnut, one of the teen Vikings.
- The Moorwen in the film Outlander is based on Grendel. The Moorwen is the last of its kind, its species having been massacred by humans. Thus, it seeks revenge on humans. The Moorwen is ultimately killed when it is forced off a cliff.
- In the DIC Mini-Series, Siegfried & Roy: Masters of the Impossible, Grendel was a "gentle giant" kind of monster that resembled a troll with eyes on its back and made a deal with King Midas's son to help his ailing mother.

== Comics and graphic novels ==
- Grendel comics written and drawn by Matt Wagner
- Anand, Astrid and Bill Carroll. Beowulf (1987)
- 1975-1976: Beowulf: Dragon Slayer Issue #2, July 1995. (DC Comics).
- Grendel (spelled Grendell) is a character in series published by Marvel Comics, who has appeared in a few episodes as an antagonist of Thor and Hercules. He is a member of the Dark Elves.
- 2009: In the Secret Six title by DC Comics, Grendel is the spawn of the supervillain Vandal Savage. He is killed by Wonder Woman when he tries to eat his half sister Scandal.
- Grendel is featured in issue #3 and issue #6 in the second volume of the ongoing Ghostbusters IDW comic series.
- Within the Godzilla comic book miniseries Godzilla: Here There Be Dragons II - Sons of Giants, the kaiju Hedorah takes on the role of Grendel in a version of the story where Beowulf did not survive the battle.

== Essays ==
Grendel appears in the speech Harold E. Varmus gave for winning the Nobel Prize in Physiology or Medicine for his work on oncogenes, at the Nobel Banquet, December 10, 1989. He stated a cancer cell is "like Grendel, a distorted vision of our normal selves". Adrienne Kennedy also used Grendel as a metaphor in her essay "Grendel and Grendel's Mother".

== Games ==
- Grendels are one of the breeds featured in the artificial life program Creatures.
- Grendel is the name of the heavy assault rifle in Crysis 2.
- Grendel is a monster in the Dragon Quest series.
- Grendel is a boss mob in the PlayStation 2 game EverQuest Online Adventures.
- Final Fantasy VIII features a boss monster, which later becomes an incidental monster, called Grendel which depicts the beast as being four-legged.
- Grendel's Cave: a MUD role-playing fantasy game based on the original story.
- Final Fantasy Tactics
- Grendel is one of the bosses in the PSP game Lord of Arcana by Square Enix.
- In Shadowrun, Grendel are portrayed as solitary, subterranean orcs fallen victim to the magical HMHVV virus.
- The MMORPG Runescape features a monster named the Kendal, a reference to Grendel. It is later revealed that this monster is actually a cannibalistic human serial killer in a bear suit.
- Skies of Arcadia features a monster named Grendel.
- Grendel is a Boss character in Too Human, known as "GRNDL-1".
- In The Wolf Among Us by Telltale Games, Grendel is magically disguised as a normal-looking human yet possesses the attributes in the main story. Gren (short for Grendel) has the ability to transform into a white, giant-like creature at will, resembling the giant in Beowulf. After a drawn-out fight, the player character, Bigby Wolf (the Big Bad Wolf himself) has the option of ripping off his arm, as a nod to his original Beowulf appearance.
- Grendel is a recurring demon in the Shin Megami Tensei series.
- In Ragnarok Odyssey and its Ace expansion Grendel was depicted as a massive masked giant who had a knack for getting up after being slain, leading many of the characters to believe he was immortal. Grendel was also shown to have an alternate appearance called "Bronze Grendel" due to entering and being trapped in the Sograt desert, which tanned his skin.
- In God of War (2018) the protagonist Kratos at one point faces two elemental boss monsters at the same time named "Grendel of the Ashes" and "Grendel of the Frosts", obviously named after the creature.
- In Skullgirls Grendel appears in the Story mode of Beowulf.
- Grendel is the name of one of the bio-mechanical suits known as Warframes in the game of the same name.
- Grendel is the name of an optional side mission and its final boss in the Borderlands 2 expansion Captain Scarlett and Her Pirate's Booty
- Grendel appears in the 2020 video game Assassin's Creed: Valhalla. Summoned to East Anglia by an abbess to investigate strange cattle killings, the protagonist Eivor ultimately discovers them to have been the work of Grendel: a gigantic, mentally disabled man afflicted with strange mould, who merely thought he was 'playing'. After killing Grendel and his mother, a remorseful Eivor bids the abbess to heavily fictionalise the events of Grendel's death.
- In Trails's Calvard arc, the Grendel is a powerful monstrous-looking armor of unknown origin that the protagonist Van can don through his Hollow Core AI making him "don his nightmares" after an incident with the first Genesis orbment. It first appears to be technological in nature, but it's later revealed that it is more mystical than it lets on. It seems to be greatly connected to the truth of the world and Van's true identity.

== Literature ==
Grendel has appeared in multiple works of contemporary literature.

- Larry Niven's short story "Grendel" (1968)
- In John Gardner's novel, Grendel (1971), Grendel retells the epic poem Beowulf from Grendel's perspective, starting with his 12-year war against Hrothgar's kingdom up to his death at the hands of Beowulf. He is portrayed as a pensive, solitary creature who fears life has no objective meaning. The work explores themes of existentialism and nihilism. The novel was nominated for the 1972 Mythopoeic Award for best novel.
- In John Norman's novel Marauders of Gor (1975), protagonist Tarl Cabot kills a prominent Kur (in prior novels, termed "the Others", antagonistic to the Priest Kings he serves), and mounts its head as a permanent trophy for the Torvaldslanders—and when queried by his aide-de-camp Samos, terms it Grendel (followed by the single word "yes" as a sop to erstwhile Canadian slave-girl Leah's curiosity). Another Kur called Grendel appears in other Gor books.
- In Michael Crichton's novel Eaters of the Dead (1976), the Wendol are implied to be Neanderthals.
- The Legacy of Heorot (1987), a novel by Larry Niven, Jerry Pournelle, and Steven Barnes, includes alien predators called "grendels".
- In The Gripping Hand (1993) by Niven and Pournelle, there is a brief mention of "sea grendels"
- Grendel and "Grendel's ma" (aka "Grendel's mum") are also characters in Suniti Namjoshi's 1993 postmodern collection of feminist fairytales, St Suniti and the Dragon. Consisting of non-sequential poetry and prose, St Suniti and the Dragon focuses on the adventures of St. Suniti, a female saint-in-training. During these adventures, St. Suniti has a number of encounters with Grendel and Grendel's ma.
- James Rollins makes numerous explicit references to Beowulf and Grendel in Ice Hunt (2003) (e.g., chapter 15, page 2), which novel also prominently features a subterranean research base on the Arctic's floating polar ice cap, called Grendel Ice Station after ancient creatures called grendels.
- Grendel appears in the short story "Far Flew The Boast of Him" by Brian Hodge, collected in the 2004 anthology Hellboy: Odd Jobs. Hellboy confronts Grendel near Lindisfarne, where Grendel has been inadvertently summoned by a group of medieval reenactors.
- In Neil Gaiman's American Gods novella The Monarch of the Glen (2006), Grendel is ritually battled and killed every year before the champion who defeated them is then sacrificed.
- Grendel is the nickname of the character Chris Sellers in Chuck Klosterman's book, Downtown Owl (2008).
- April Genevieve Tucholke’s 2018 novel The Boneless Mercies, a feminist reimagining of Beowulf, includes the character Logafell, last of a race of ice giants, based on Grendel.
- Adrian Tchaikovsky's 2019 novella, Walking to Aldebaran, features an astronaut named Gary Rendell, who is lost in a giant alien artefact and becomes increasingly monstrous as the story progresses.

== Military ==
- The 6.5 Grendel is a 6.5 mm rifle cartridge developed by the small arms company, Alexander Arms, to serve as an intermediate power round, falling somewhere between the 5.56×45mm NATO and 7.62×51mm NATO. They also have a correlative round that is much more powerful, the .50 Beowulf

== Music ==
- "Grendel", a song on the Diary album by Sunny Day Real Estate
- Grendel (band), a Netherlands-based dark electro/hard EBM band
- Grendel: an opera composed by Elliot Goldenthal, based on the Gardner novel, directed by Julie Taymor, and commissioned by Los Angeles Opera; it was given its world premiere at the Dorothy Chandler Pavilion on June 8, 2006, with bass Eric Owens starring in the title role.
- "Grendel" by Marillion. B side to their first single, "Market Square Heroes" (1982).
- Grendels Arm: an American heavy metal band based in Oakland, MD

== Television ==
- In the first season of the Comedy Central program Battlebots, Grendel was the name of a green, super-heavyweight robot that used a spiked hammer arm as a weapon. It was subsequently used in the Battlebots remote-controlled toy line.
- In Once Upon a Time in Wonderland, Grendel is a man disfigured by the Red Queen.
- In the Star Trek Voyager episode "Heroes and Demons" (1995), a holographic version of the Beowulf poem malfunctions when the ship encounters a group of non-corporeal life forms, and crew members are taken prisoner by the program's incarnation of Grendel. Ultimately, the Doctor must take the role of Beowulf to rescue them.
- In The Simpsons season 20 episode: "Four Great Women and a Manicure" (May 10, 2009), when Moe sees Selma in the "Queen Elisabeth the First" segment, he says, "Grendel got in again."
- Grendel appears in several episodes of Xena: Warrior Princess season 6 as Grindl.
- Grendel, known as a mudborn beast, is a recurring character in Beowulf: Return to the Shieldlands, with the character of Elvina revealing herself to be his mother in the final episode.

== See also ==
- List of artistic depictions of Beowulf
- List of artistic depictions of Grendel's mother
