= Davey Williams (disambiguation) =

Davey Williams (1927–2009) was an American baseball player.

Davey Williams may also refer to:

- Davey Williams (American football) (born 1954), American football player
- Davey Williams (musician) (1952–2019), American free improvisation and avant-garde music guitarist

== See also ==
- Dave Williams (disambiguation)
- David Williams (disambiguation)
