= David C. Williams (politician) =

American politician

David C. Williams was an American politician. He served in the California legislature and during World War I he served in the United States Army.
