= David Williams (cricketer, born 1948) =

English cricketer

Personal information
- Full name: David Williams
- Born: 25 May 1948 (age 78); Barnsley, Yorkshire, England
- Batting: Right-handed
- Bowling: Slow left-arm orthodox

Domestic team information
- Years: Team
- 1968–1973: Oxford University
- 1972–1973: Oxfordshire

Career statistics
Competition	First-class	List A
Matches	29	1
Runs scored	497	5
Batting average	12.42	5.00
100s/50s	–/1	–/–
Top score	52	5
Balls bowled	1,453	0
Wickets	24	–
Bowling average	35.29	–
5 wickets in innings	1	–
10 wickets in match	–	–
Best bowling	5/19	–
Catches/stumpings	16/–	1/–
- Source: Cricinfo, 24 June 2019

David Williams (born 25 May 1948) is an English former cricketer.

Williams was born at Barnsley in May 1948, later going up to Queen's College, Oxford. While studying at Oxford he made his debut in first-class cricket for Oxford University against Gloucestershire at Oxford in 1968. Williams played first-class cricket for Oxford until 1973, making a total of 29 first-class appearances, alongside one List A one-day appearance against Leicestershire in the 1973 Benson & Hedges Cup. In his 29 first-class matches, Williams scored a total of 497 runs at an average of 12.42, with a high score of 52. With his slow left-arm orthodox bowling, he took 24 wickets at a bowling average of 35.29, with best figures of 5 for 19. These figures, which were his only first-class five wicket haul came against Surrey in 1968. In addition to playing first-class and List A cricket, Williams also played minor counties cricket for Oxfordshire in 1972 and 1973, making five appearances in the Minor Counties Championship.
