= David Chappe =

American screenwriter

David Chappe (November 8, 1947, in Brooklyn – May 13, 2002, in Los Angeles) was best known as the screenwriter who launched the bidding wars of the late 1980s with his script Gale Force. David was a novelist, photographer, screenwriting instructor, story editor, artist and pianist.

== Personal life ==
Chappe was born in Flatbush, New York and moved to Appleton, Wisconsin, at age eight. He competed as a concert pianist from ages six to 16 and led canoe trips in the Canadian wilderness of the Boundary Waters. He earned his BA in History and Political Science from Alfred University, and his Master of Fine Arts from Visual Studies Workshop, Rochester, New York, in 1978. He learned to tell stories through sequencing of photographic images and later used that visual story sense in writing screenplays. While at VSW Chappe printed dozens of small publications on their Heidelberg Press and moved to Los Angeles in 1980 to work for another small press.

Chappe died in 2002 after a four-year battle with angiosarcoma. He was survived by his wife June Stoddard, daughters Chloe and Jessica, mother Bess, brother Marc, aunt Millie Kleineman and nephew Durin.

== Film career ==
Surrounded by screenwriters in Venice, California, he wrote nearly twenty original screenplays and two novels. Prior to his screenwriting career David wrote for He-Man and the Masters of the Universe. In just five years he read and wrote coverage on over 5,000 screenplays, becoming the Story Editor for White Eagle Enterprises, Sylvester Stallone's company. In 1989 he finished Gale Force which was snapped up by Dan Melnick who partnered to produce it with Carolco and actively aided Carolco in the bidding. Stallone was to star. The script was repeatedly rewritten. Relative newcomer Renny Harlin was hired to direct and worked with seven rewriters. After years of rewrites the plug was pulled two weeks before production and the entire creative team moved to Cliffhanger.

After the sale of Gale Force Chappe continued to write original screenplays, novels, became a re-writer for Hollywood action films, and wrote the production draft of the 1999 film Beowulf.

== Selected filmography ==
TV

- He-Man and the Masters of the Universe Disappearing Act, 1983

Film

- Beowulf, 1999
