= Beowulf (1999 film) =

- French theatrical release poster
- Directed by: Graham Baker
- Screenplay by: Mark Leahy; David Chappe
- Based on: Beowulf
- Produced by: Lawrence Kasanoff
- Starring: Christopher Lambert; Rhona Mitra; Oliver Cotton; Götz Otto; Layla Roberts; Patricia Velásquez
- Cinematography: Christopher Faloona
- Edited by: Roy Watts
- Music by: Jonathan Sloate; Ben Watkins
- Production companies: Threshold Entertainment; European Motion Pictures; The Kushner-Locke Company
- Distributed by: Dimension Films; The Kushner-Locke Company; Capitol Films Limited
- Release date: March 31, 1999 (United States)
- Running time: 93 minutes
- Country: United States
- Language: English
- Budget: $20 million

Beowulf is a 1999 American science fantasy-action film loosely based on the Old English epic poem Beowulf. The film was directed by Graham Baker and written by Mark Leahy and David Chappe. Unlike most film adaptations of the poem, this version is a science-fiction/fantasy film that, according to one film critic, "takes place in a post-apocalyptic, techno-feudal future that owes more to Mad Max than Beowulf." While the film remains fairly true to the story of the original poem, other plot elements deviate from the original poem (Hrothgar has an affair with Grendel's mother, and they have a child together, Grendel; Hrothgar's wife commits suicide).

== Plot ==
A castle-like outpost comes under attack by a creature named Grendel on a nightly basis. However, it refuses to attack the border lord Hrothgar. One of the outpost's residents, Pendra, escapes the following morning but is captured by a rival siege line that intends to kill her to prevent the outpost's evil from spreading. Pendra is saved by a mysterious warrior named Beowulf and rides with him, but when she realizes Beowulf is riding for the outpost, she runs back to the siege line and is killed. Beowulf meets Hrothgar and is permitted to stay to help slay the beast. Hrothgar, his daughter Kyra, and his military leader Roland suspect that Beowulf was sent by a rival family to avenge the death of their son Nivri, Kyra's former husband. However, Kyra's suspicions dissipate when she realizes that Beowulf can sense evil.

For a few nights, Hrothgar experiences nightmares about his late wife's suicide, triggered by a mysterious woman who stalks him in his sleep. When Grendel attacks during the day, Beowulf and Hrothgar's remaining soldiers are forced to confront Grendel. They evacuate the women and children to a sanctuary, but they are immediately slaughtered by Grendel. Beowulf manages to wound Grendel, but is also wounded in the process. As Kyra attends to Beowulf, Roland confesses his romantic feelings for her; however, she only sees him as a brother. After Beowulf recovers, Kyra reveals that Nivri was an abusive spouse, and she killed him after he attempted to rape her. Beowulf believes she was justified. Beowulf faces Grendel again and severs its arm. Believing Grendel to be dead, the survivors celebrate, and Roland is lured by the woman, who kills him.

Kyra discloses her romantic feelings to Beowulf, and the two have sex. Afterward, Beowulf reveals to Kyra that he is half-human because his mother was impregnated by Bael, and he is only able to suppress his inner evil by battling evil. Beowulf senses the mysterious woman and rushes to find her. Kyra and Hrothgar return to the dining hall to find everyone dead, including Roland. They encounter her, who reveals herself to be Grendel's mother, and Hrothgar, who is Grendel's father, which is why Grendel had spared him before. Hrothgar's unfaithfulness led to his wife's suicide. Hrothgar attempts to kill the succubus but is killed by Grendel. Beowulf arrives and kills the beast. Grendel's mother attempts to seduce Beowulf but fails, transforming into a giant, humanoid spider-like creature. After Beowulf defeats her, their battle forces the outpost to collapse on itself. Beowulf and Kyra escape, and she convinces him to let her accompany him on his journeys.

== Cast ==
- Christopher Lambert as Beowulf
- Rhona Mitra as Kyra
- Oliver Cotton as Hrothgar
- Götz Otto as Roland
- Vincent Hammond as Grendel
- Charlie Robinson as Weaponsmaster
- Brent Jefferson Lowe as Will
- Roger Sloman as Karl
- Layla Roberts as Grendel's mother
- Patricia Velásquez as Pendral

== Production ==
The production was filmed in Romania. The film's end credits says: "Filmed on location in Romania". The specific location is the city of Rupea, in Transylvania.

== Themes ==
As with other Beowulf adaptations, the film reinterprets the poem, blending its original genre with "tropes from horror and soft pornography," but it also retains and expands on its original elements.

The film addresses the poem's plot point of Beowulf not having a wife or an heir, as it reveals Beowulf to be the same kind of creature as the monsters themselves, making him refusing to produce offspring. The poem's emphasis on genealogy is represented by humans and monsters mating with each other, with Grendel being the son of Hrothgar and Beowulf being the result of a god of darkness inseminating a woman. Beowulf and Grendel are shown as mirror images of each other, as the former harbors an internal struggle to contain his monstrous nature, while the latter was conceived by his mother as a revenge for an external oppression.

Grendel's mother is portrayed as a representation of monstrous female sexuality. She operates as a seductive succubus, giving birth to monsters, but can also shapeshift into a monster herself. This form resembles a dragon, an arachnid and a gorgon, not only evoking the Freudian Medusa's Head, but also evoking the archaic mother by resembling a vagina dentata with phallic talons. She also sexually attacks Hrothgar, inverting the trope of horror film monsters chasing after female leads.

== Music ==
The film's soundtrack mainly featured electronic and industrial songs from various artists and original score material by Juno Reactor's Ben Watkins.

- Jonathan Sloate – "Beowulf"
- Front 242 – "Religion (Bass Under Siege mix by the Prodigy)"
- Pig – "No One Gets Out of Her Alive, Jump the Gun (Instrumental)"
- Gravity Kills – "Guilty (Juno Reactor remix)"
- Juno Reactor – "God is God"
- Fear Factory – "Cyberdyne"
- Laughing US – "Universe"
- KMFDM – "Witness"
- Lunatic Calm – "The Sound"
- Junkie XL – "Def Beat"
- Urban Voodoo – "Ego Box"
- 2wo – "Stutter Kiss"
- Spirit Feel – "Unfolding Towards the Light"
- Mindfeel – "Cranium Heads Out"
- Frontside – "Dammerung"
- Praga Khan – "Luv u Still"
- Anthrax – "Giving the Horns"
- Monster Magnet – "Lord 13"

== Critical response ==
Critical reaction to the film has been highly negative. The general criticisms for the film were the weak script, below-average acting, corny dialogue, deviations from the source material, and over-reliance on camp, although it was hailed for its production design. Danél Griffin of Film as Art said the film "understands that liberties must be taken with the poem's characters to create a more cinematic experience, and there are moments that, even in its liberties, it reveals a deep appreciation for the poem, and a profound understanding of its ideas. There are other moments, however, that seem so absurd and outlandish that we wonder if the writers, Mark Leahy and David Chappe, have even read the poem." Griffin added that "Lambert is certainly effective", but concluded that "clever ideas aside, the film is unfortunately mediocre at best. The set design and some of the revised storyline are both stupendous, but the overall experience makes for poor cinema."

Beyond Hollywood's review said that "genre films don't get any sillier than this", but called the film "above average". The review praised the film's "energetic action" and said that it "excels in set design", but added that "the techno (music) is pretty annoying." Calling the film "a cheesy post-apocalyptic update of the ancient tale", Carlo Cavagna of About Film praised the film's action scenes but felt that Lambert and Mitra had no chemistry.

Literature scholars have been negative as well. Michael Livingstone and John William Sutton are brief, calling it "an otherwise ridiculous" film, though they say it well reflects the problematization of "black-and-white morality" "in our postmodern, post Vietnam, post-9/11 era." Commenting on the movie's proposed similarity between Beowulf and Grendel, they say, "although the film is cringingly hokey and melodramatic, it effectively illustrates the idea of the aeglaeca—that Beowulf and the monsters may have more in common than we care to admit."
