= David Williams (Australian Indigenous musician) =

David Williams Performing on the Great Wall of China in 2006

David Williams is an Australian musician and artist. Williams plays the didgeridoo and has performed at various events, such as the 2008 Beijing Olympics. His works can be found in collections around Europe and Australia.

== Early life ==
Williams is a descendant of the Wakka Wakka people from central southwest Queensland, he was brought up with his culture in suburban Rockhampton, Queensland.

Learning traditional songs from his grandmother, Williams experienced first-hand the language and music of his people from an early age. Growing up in a musical family, he began learning the trombone from an early age. During his trombone studies, he would often cross over and play the didgeridoo as his skills as a brass player enabled him to develop his own style of blending traditional and contemporary didgeridoo.

== Career ==
David Williams in Traditional Dress.

Williams's skills as a didgeridoo player have taken him around Australia and also internationally to Beijing, Shanghai, New Zealand and San Francisco. He has performed with James Morrison and Jane Rutter and in concert for John Travolta. He has also collaborated with a number of ensembles and orchestras, performing Philip Bračanin's Dance Gundah for didgeridoo and orchestra in 2006.

In November 2005 Williams performed with Jane Rutter and James Morrison for the Qantas 85th Birthday. The event was celebrated with John Travolta and the arrival of the Airbus A380.

In January 2006 Williams traveled to Beijing, China to perform with Bernadette Robinson and Paul Noonan for the celebration of direct flights between Sydney and Beijing. Two months later in March, Williams travelled to San Francisco to perform for the celebration of direct flights between Sydney and San Francisco.

In August 2008, Williams performed at the opening ceremony of the 2008 Beijing Olympics and in March 2009, in Westminster Abbey in a memorial service for victims of the bushfires in front of Kevin Rudd, Prince Charles and Camilla.

Also an accomplished artist, Williams has spent much time developing an indigenous style that was traditional though unique and modern. His motivation to develop as a visual artist saw his collection of works increase, resulting in his first collaborative exhibition in 2003. Williams presented his first solo Australian exhibition in 2004 with his first overseas exhibition to follow in Sweden later that year. Williams's works now feature in private collections in Australia, Italy, Spain, England, Sweden and Germany.

As of 2008 Williams is currently creative director of Gilimbaa, an indigenous design agency.
