= David Williams (archaeologist) =

British archaeologist (1949–2017)

David Williams FSA
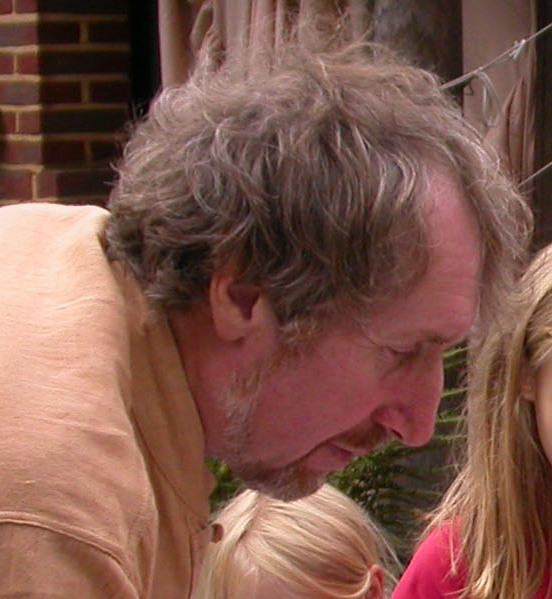
- Williams in 2006
- Born: 1949
- Died: 9 December 2017 (aged 68); Reigate, Surrey, England

Academic work
- Discipline: Archaeology
- Institutions: Portable Antiquities Scheme

David Wynn Williams FSA (1949 – 9 December 2017) was a British archaeologist.

== Career ==
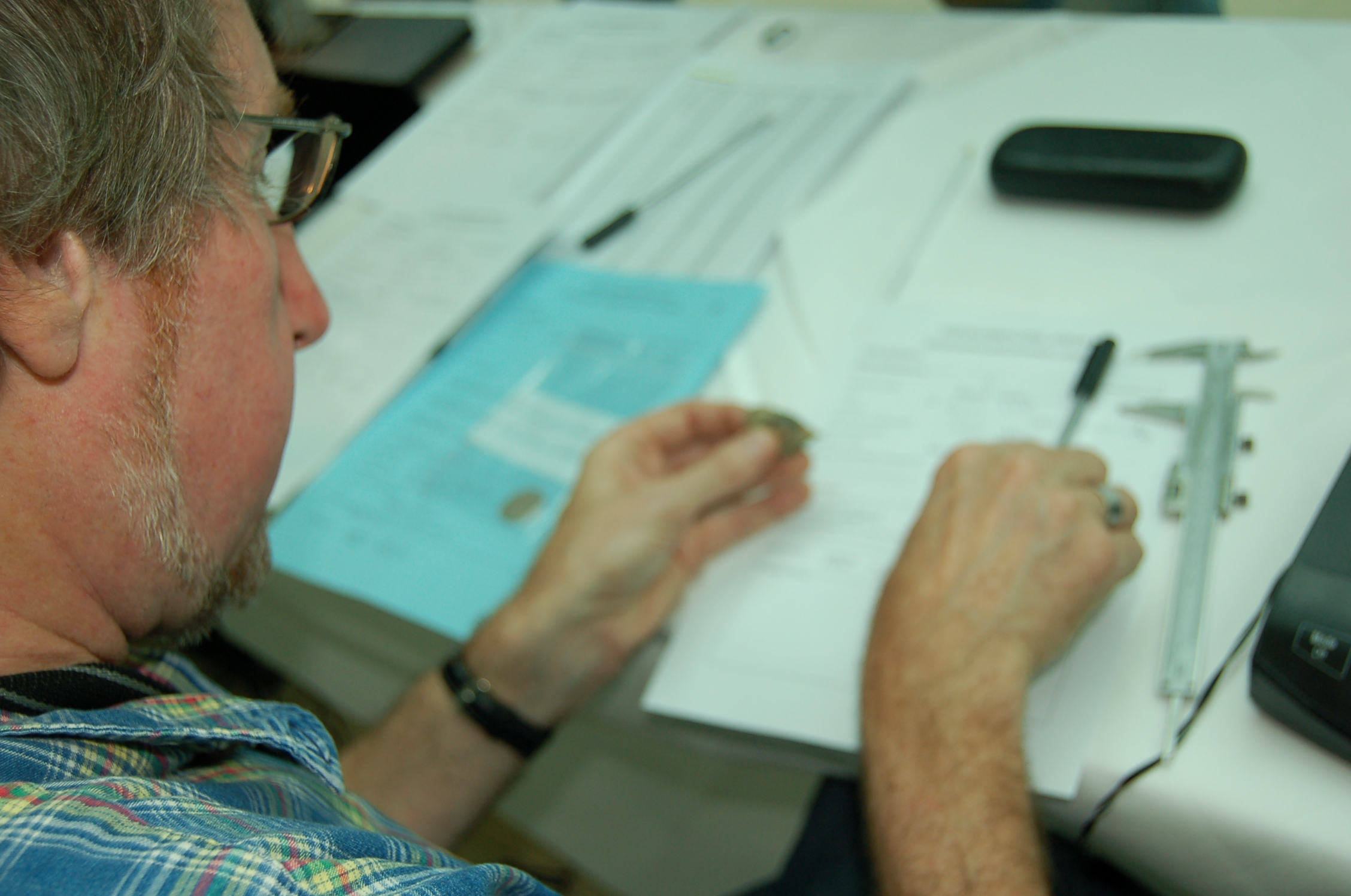
Williams at work recording finds in 2006

Williams initially attended the Reigate School of Art, Design and Media and used his experience in graphic design to work as an archaeological illustrator, including drawing Native American and South American artefacts for the Museum of Mankind. He was a long-time member of the Surrey Archaeological Society (SAS) and the Weald and Downland Metal Detecting Club and took part in numerous excavations throughout Britain and Europe, including at the Roman temple complex at Wanborough, Surrey and Betchworth.

He was elected as a Fellow of the Society of Antiquaries of London in April 1998.

Williams took up the role of Find Liaison Officer for Surrey with the Portable Antiquities Scheme in 2003 (latterly also for East Berkshire). He stayed in this role until he died unexpectedly at home on 9 December 2017. A memorial conference was held in his honour by the Surrey Archaeological Society on 9 February 2019. An edited volume of papers was published in his honour in 2022, titled Back in the bag: Essays exploring artefacts in honour of David Wynn Williams.

== Select publications ==
- Late Saxon stirrup-strap mounts: a classification and catalogue. Council For British Archaeology. 1998. ISBN 1872414842.
- 50 finds from Surrey: objects from the portable antiquities scheme. Amberley. 2016. ISBN 978-1445658735.
