= Grendel's Cave =

1998 video game

- Developer: Grendel Enterprises
- Platform: Web browser
- Release: August 1, 1998
- Genre: Role-playing
- Mode: Multiplayer

Grendel's Cave is a real-time browser-based role-playing video game and MUD from Grendel Enterprises. The basis for Grendel’s Cave was Anglo-Saxon mythology and Beowulf, and it is set in the historical medieval period. Scholars consider it an artistic depiction of Grendel and the poem, Beowulf, as well as a modern adaptation and a derivative work of the epic. Educational websites use Grendel's Cave as an Internet learning aid for medieval literature and they considered it an online Beowulf resource.

== Literary significance ==
Grendel's Cave was an online Beowulf resource that goes beyond the written text by allowing players to participate in the story. Scholars consider it a modern adaptation of the original Beowulf poem. Glenco McGraw-Hill uses the site as part of their Study Guide for Beowulf. Educational websites use Grendel's Cave as an online reference for medieval literature.

== History ==
Mars Software Products wrote the first version of Grendel's Cave in 1981 as a single-player video game for the SWTPC 6800 microcomputer. This version was a fully text-based game but included many of the features of the later Internet incarnations of the game. The developer based the game on an older pen and paper dungeon game with the same name.

In 1997, Grendel's Net took over the project and began development of an Internet version of the game. Grendel's Net conducted their development as an experiment in Classic ASP and Microsoft SQL 6.0 programming for the World Wide Web. They rolled out Version 1.0 in August 1998. This version ran until July 2001. Hacking and cheats plagued this version during the last year of its run, which finally brought about the demise of the game.

In early 2005, Grendel Enterprises acquired the rights to all of Grendel's Net assets. Grendel Enterprises' programmers found the original Grendel's Cave source code on an old database server in an office closet. Soon after, they started work on Grendel's Cave v2.0. They rolled out the first beta, v1.8A, on April 1, 2005 and over the next two years followed it up by four more pre-2.0 versions, 1.8B, 1.8C, 1.9, and 2.0 betas. Finally, on November 11, 2007, version 2.0 went live. Version 2.0 contained many aspects of the original Grendel's Cave with the addition of many Norse mythological elements and NPCs.

The game's graphics have remained mostly unchanged throughout its history, giving it and old and outdated look.

Version 3.0 added text only and MUD style user interfaces, TTS-enabling the game.

While originally closed down on April 1, 2018, the game was revived as a subscription game at some point in 2020.

== Gameplay ==
Gameplay involves creating Thanes, the player characters in the game, killing monsters, primarily found in Grendel's Cave, increasing value and stats and collecting items. Thanes obtain gold rings, the game's currency, by selling obtained items or Singing of Deeds before King Hrothgar. They gain magical abilities by visiting the Witch or through acquired items. Ultimately, this leads players to complete quests and earn amulets, by traveling to other worlds, and trading in those earned amulets for the Yggdrasil amulet and thus gaining the ability to kill Grendel. Killing Grendel is the ultimate objective of the game. After killing Grendel there is a secondary objective, killing Grendel's Mother, and then a tertiary objective, killing The Dragon.

At any one time there are many kingdoms running, with a Grendel in each kingdom that players can kill, of several different kingdom types. The different kingdom types range from beginner to advanced, with increasing difficulty and requirements for killing Grendel, occasionally tournament style or championship kingdoms and personal kingdoms that can be custom configured by individual players. The less advanced kingdoms are generally non-PVP, while the more advanced kingdoms allow PVP and player killing.

Killing Grendel in any of the more advanced kingdoms earns the player's Thane a place on the hall of fame. To date 202 Thanes have earned a spot on the hall of fame.

== Plot and setting ==
The basis for Grendel's Cave is the Anglo-Saxon poem, Beowulf. It is set in King Hrothgar's, king of the Danes, kingdom in the early 6th century. The kingdom is in the middle of its war with Grendel. Grendel is an AI monster, who performs many tasks, most of them nasty, involving killing or harassing Thanes in the game. It contains many Norse mythology elements but also contains anachronistic elements as well as many references to historical events and items and popular culture. It encompasses Norse cosmology, with each of the nine worlds represented in the game. Player's Thanes can travel to these worlds and complete quests. Thanes can take on other than human characteristics, including Valkyrie, Berserkers, Tricksters, and Shape-Shifters, among others.

== Versions ==
Version	Start date	End date	Slayer Count	Notes
1.0	1998-08-01	2001-07-06	45	First Web version, Free
1.8 Beta-A	2005-04-01	2005-06-12	20	Free
1.8 Beta-B	2005-06-13	2005-07-15	3	Free
1.8 Beta-C	2005-07-16	2005-11-03	1	Free
1.9	2005-11-04	2007-11-11	10	Live, pay to play version Enhanced security features Clone of original 1.0 version
2.0 Beta	2007-02-23	2007-11-11	None, Grendel declared winner	Free; Norse elements/Quests added
2.0	2007-11-11	2010-11-05	17	Free, pay for advanced features
2.1	2010-04-09	2011-09-12	5	Free, pay for advanced features Expanded Quests; Easier Startup Conditions
2.5	2011-11-13	2012-06-01	50	Free, pay for advanced features Easing of the game Kingdom Progression
2.6	2012-06-01	2013-02-15	12	Free, pay for advanced features Facebook App Version with Account Linking and Messaging; Increased Difficulty
2.7	2013-02-15	2013-08-17	7	Free, pay for advanced features One Semiannual Cash Prize based on a point system and awarded at the end of the version's run
2.8	2013-08-17	2014-02-16	11	Free, pay for advanced features Repeatable Quests; Special competition kingdoms run for a single day; Halloween and Grendel's Birthday Challenge
2.8.1	2014-02-16	2014-08-15	5	Free, pay for advanced features Addition of a higher level and more difficult kingdom type
2.8.2	2014-08-16	2015-04-26	15	Free, pay for advanced features Private Rooms; Chat
2.9	2015-04-28	2015-08-28	1	Free, pay for advanced features Additional Quests
3.0	2015-08-28	2016-02-28	6	Free, pay for advanced features Text only and MUD style user interfaces Tribe rooms and Tribal wars
4.0	2016-06-01	2018-04-01	none	Free, pay for advanced features New leveling system with an Einherjar status added for winning the top level kingdom and top level cash prizes Daily Cash Prizes
5.0	2020	present	none	Monthly subscription, $10.95, first 24 hours free Six kingdom levels
