= Dave Williams (radio announcer) =

Australian radio announcer

Dave Williams (born 17 June 1971 in Ballarat, Australia) is an Australian radio presenter best known for his long-running on‑air roles across major metropolitan stations, including Triple M Melbourne.

Widely recognised by his on‑air nickname “Dangerous Dave”, Williams built a reputation for high‑energy broadcasting and stunt‑driven segments that often involved an element of risk. He has been nominated for the Australian Commercial Radio Awards (ACRAs) seven times, and in 2013 was named Australia’s Best Music Jock by Radio Today.

== Early life and introduction to radio ==
Williams grew up in Ballarat, where his early exposure to broadcasting came through his father, who hosted a weekly community radio program on 3BBB (now Voice FM). Williams frequently accompanied him to the station and began reading Tattslotto numbers on air as a teenager. This early involvement led to work experience at 3BA Ballarat, where he developed the ambition to pursue radio professionally.

== Career ==
=== Regional beginnings ===
Williams began his professional radio career in January 1992 at 2LM Lismore in northern New South Wales. He later became the first on‑air host of Triple Z Lismore, establishing himself as a young announcer with a flair for personality-driven radio.

In 1996, he moved to Sun FM Shepparton in Central Victoria, where he hosted breakfast and won his first ACRA/RAWARD for Best Music Personality: Provincial.

=== Move to metropolitan radio ===
Williams’ metro career began in 1999 when he joined 101.9 Fox FM Melbourne, working across afternoons and drive. Over the following years he held roles at several major stations, including:

- Fox FM (Melbourne)
- Nova 100 (Melbourne)
- 2Day FM (Sydney)
- Triple M Sydney

During this period he worked alongside many prominent Australian radio and comedy personalities, including Eddie McGuire, Mick Molloy, Kyle Sandilands, Jackie O, Dave Hughes, Wil Anderson, Tony Martin, Judith Lucy, Tracy Bartram, Peter Helliar and Myf Warhurst.

=== Triple M Melbourne ===
Williams joined Triple M Melbourne in the late 2000s, becoming a fixture of the station’s music and entertainment lineup. Over his tenure he has served as an announcer, anchor and contributor to comedy and music segments, and has been part of national programs including:

- Kennedy Molloy (with Mick Molloy and Jane Kennedy)
- My Generation (host since 2019)

He has conducted interviews with major international artists such as Bon Jovi and Pearl Jam, and co‑hosted the 2009 Sound Relief radiothon, which raised more than $1 million for victims of the Black Saturday bushfires.

=== Professional reputation ===
Williams’ “Dangerous Dave” moniker stems from his willingness to perform stunts and on‑air challenges. He is regarded within the industry for his work ethic, creativity and mentorship of emerging broadcasters. By 2025, he had marked 33 years in radio and 25 years in metro markets, making him one of Australia’s longest‑serving contemporary music announcers.
