= Layla Roberts =

American actor and model

Playboy centerfold appearance
- October 1997
- Preceded by: Nikki Schieler
- Succeeded by: Inga Drozdova

Personal details
- Born: Layla Harvest Roberts; October 22, 1974 (age 51) Kealakekua, Kona, Hawaii, U.S.
- Height: 5 ft 9.5 in (1.77 m)
- Official website

Layla Harvest Roberts (born October 22, 1974) is an American model and actress. She was Playboy magazine's Playmate of the Month for its October 1997 issue. Her centerfold was photographed by Stephen Wayda.

== Early and personal life ==
Roberts was born in Kealakekua, a census-designated place on Hawaii's Big Island, to an Italian-American father and a Native American mother. Unlike most other playmates, she started her career as a model: the Ford and Elite modeling agencies fought over who would be the first to sign her to model.

Roberts at one time was in a relationship with New England Patriots quarterback, Tom Brady.

Daughter Paris Emerson Hilinski who was born in 2003 by John Hilinski. On August 1, 2004 the two married.

== Career ==
Roberts has done L'Oréal campaigns in Paris. She appeared on the cover of GQ in 2003, as well as FHM and Maxim.

She can be seen in the role of Molly Mounds in the 1998 film Armageddon, the 1999 film Beowulf and the 2000 film Red Letters.

Jami Ferrell	Kimber West	Jennifer Miriam	Kelly Monaco	Lynn Thomas	Carrie Stevens
Daphnée Duplaix	Kalin Olson	Nikki Ziering	Layla Roberts	Inga Drozdova	Karen McDougal
