= David Williams (geologist, born 1792) =

David Williams (1792–1850) was an English geologist and clergyman, who published extensively on the geology of the west of England as well as serving a parish in Somerset.

== Life ==
Williams was the son of John Williams, a landowner in Bleadon, Somerset, England. He studied at Jesus College, Oxford, where he matriculated in 1810 and obtained degrees of BA in 1814 and MA in 1820. He was ordained before obtaining his MA, and was a curate in Avebury, Wiltshire before becoming rector of Bleadon and Kingston Seymour, Somerset, in 1820. He was elected as a Fellow of the Geological Society of London in 1828, writing papers between 1831 and 1849, mainly on the geology of the west of England, particularly Cornwall and Devon. He explored the caves of the Mendip Hills and helped with Banwell bone cave. In his parish life, he objected to music in church services and was criticised for the lack of a village school in Bleadon as well as for his scruffy personal appearance. Williams died on 7 September 1850.
