= David Williams (judoka) =

American judoka (born 1965)

Personal information
- Born: 3 October 1965 (age 60) Minnesota, (United States)
- Occupation: Judoka

Sport
- Sport: Judo
- Rank: 6th dan black belt
Medal record
Men's Judo
Representing United States
USA National Championships
Gold medal – first place	San José 1996	−78 kg
United States Olympic trials
Silver medal – second place	Colorado Springs 1996	−71 kg
US Open
Gold medal – first place	Colorado Springs 1993	−71 kg
Pacific Rim Championships
Bronze medal – third place	Auckland 1993	−71 kg

Profile at external databases
- JudoInside.com: 9510

David Williams (born October 3, 1965) is an American judoka. He holds the Ryokudan.

== Life and career ==
He is a native of Minnesota. Williams won the Minnesota State Junior and Senior Championships in Judo numerous times before the age of 17. He attended and Wrestled at Iowa State University and transferred to San Jose State University in 1985, where he earned a degree in International Business, minoring in French and Japanese. After completion of his first degree he moved to Tokai University in Kanegawa, Japan, where he trained on and off until the Olympic Trials in '96. Later he completed a Masters in Intercultural Communications in 2003. He was a national and international competitor in Judo. He won the US National Judo Championships in 1996. Though he attempted to join the Olympic Team for the United States, he earned the alternate spot to Jimmy Pedro when he placed second in the 71 kg division. He was selected as the Olympic Alternate. He has had a 23-year competitive career. He also has worked as a Physical Education Professor at San Jose State University, where he completed his 20th year of service to the California State University system. In 2015, he became the first Black IJF-A Referee in USA Judo history.
