= Grendel =

Figure in the poem Beowulf

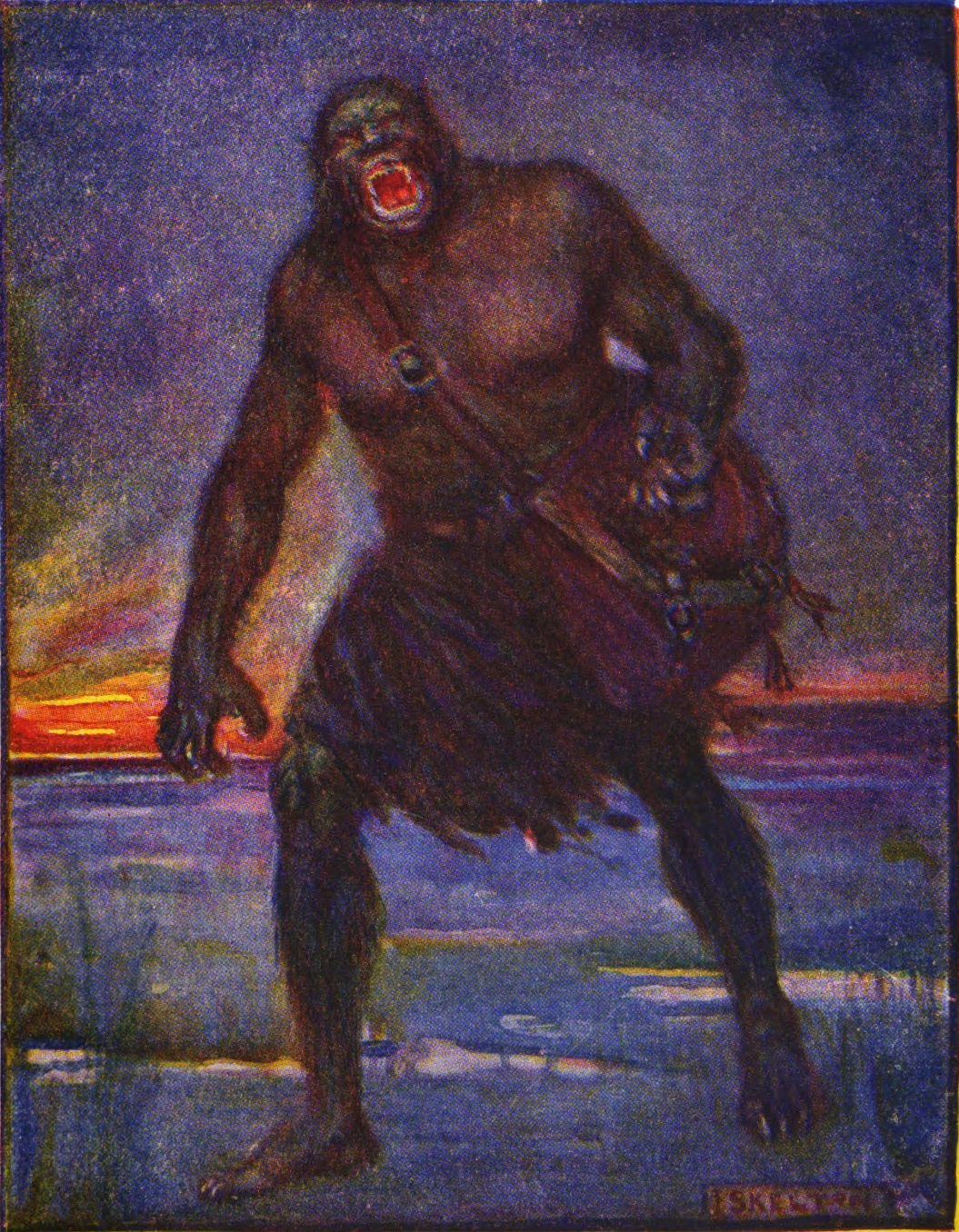
An illustration of Grendel by J. R. Skelton from the 1908 Stories of Beowulf. Grendel is described as "very terrible to look upon."

Grendel is a character in the Anglo-Saxon epic poem Beowulf (700–1000 AD). He is one of the poem's three antagonists (along with his mother and the dragon), all aligned in opposition against the protagonist Beowulf. He is referred to as both an eoten and þyrs, types of beings from wider Germanic mythology. He is also described as a descendant of the Biblical Cain and "a creature of darkness, exiled from happiness and accursed of God, the destroyer and devourer of our human kind." He is usually depicted as a monster or a giant, although his status as a monster, giant, or other form of supernatural being is not clearly described in the poem and thus remains the subject of scholarly debate. The character of Grendel and his role in the story of Beowulf have been subject to numerous reinterpretations and re-imaginings. Grendel is feared by all in Heorot but Beowulf, who kills both him and his mother.

== Story ==
Beowulf's author often uses various substitute phrases for Grendel's name like mearc stapa ("mark-stepper"), an inhabitant of the borderland.

Grendel is a figure in the poem Beowulf, preserved in the Nowell Codex. Grendel, being cursed as the descendant of the Biblical Cain, along with elves and other eotens, is "harrowed" by the sounds of singing that come every night from the mead hall of Heorot built by King Hroðgar. Unable to bear it any more, he attacks Heorot. Grendel continues to attack the Hall every night for twelve years, killing its inhabitants and making the mead hall unusable. The poet also details how Grendel consumes the men he kills, "now that he could hope to eat his fill."

Beowulf hears of these attacks and leaves his native land of the Geats to destroy Grendel. He is warmly welcomed by King Hroðgar, who gives a banquet in celebration. Afterwards, Beowulf and his warriors bed down in the mead hall to await the inevitable attack. Grendel stalks outside the building for a time, spying the warriors inside. He then makes a sudden attack, bursting through the door with his fists. The first warrior Grendel finds is still asleep, so he seizes the man and devours him. Grendel grabs a second warrior, but is shocked when the warrior grabs back with fearsome strength. As Grendel attempts to disengage, the reader discovers that Beowulf is that second warrior. Beowulf uses neither weapon nor armour in this fight. He also places no reliance on his companions and has no need of them. He trusts that God has given him strength to defeat Grendel, whom he believes to be God's adversary. Beowulf tears off Grendel's arm, mortally wounding the creature. Grendel flees but dies in his marsh den. There, Beowulf later engages in a fierce battle with Grendel's mother in a mere, over whom he triumphs with a sword found there. Following her death, Beowulf finds Grendel's corpse and removes his head, which he keeps as a trophy. Beowulf then returns to the surface and to his men at the "ninth hour". He returns to Heorot, where a grateful Hroðgar showers him with gifts.

=== Narrative role ===
J. R. R. Tolkien (1936) argues for the importance of Grendel's role in the poem as an "eminently suitable beginning" that sets the stage for Beowulf's fight with the dragon: "Triumph over the lesser and more nearly human is cancelled by defeat before the older and more elemental." Tolkien argues that "the evil spirits took visible shape" in the characters of Grendel and the dragon; however, the author's concern is focused on Beowulf. Tolkien's essay was the first work of scholarship in which Anglo-Saxon literature was seriously examined on its literary merits – not just for scholarship about the origins of the English language, or what historical information could be gleaned from the text, as was common in the 19th century.

== Identity and physical description ==
=== Description in the poem ===
During the decades following Tolkien's essay, the exact description of Grendel was debated by scholars. Because his exact appearance is never directly described in Old English by the original Beowulf poet, part of the debate revolves around what is known, namely his descent from the biblical Cain (the first murderer in the Bible). Grendel is called a sceadugenga – "shadow walker", in other words "night goer" – given that the monster was repeatedly described to be in the shroud of darkness.

After Grendel's death, Hroðgar describes him as vaguely human in shape, though much larger:

Old English text	Tolkien translation
... óðer earmsceapen on weres wæstmum wraéclástas træd næfne hé wæs mára þonne aénig man óðer þone on géardagum Grendel nemdon	... the other, miscreated thing, in man's form trod the ways of exile, albeit he was greater than any other human thing. Him in days of old the dwellers on earth named Grendel

Grendel's severed head is also so large that it takes four men to transport it. Furthermore, when Grendel's torn arm is inspected it is described as being covered in impenetrable scales and horny growths.

Old English text	Heaney translation
steda nægla gehwylc stýle gelícost haéþenes handsporu hilderinces egl unhéoru aéghwylc gecwæð þæt him heardra nán hrínan wolde íren aérgód, þæt ðæs áhlaécan blódge beadufolme onberan wolde	Every nail, claw-scale and spur, every spike and welt on the hand of that heathen brute was like barbed steel. Everybody said there was no honed iron hard enough: to pierce him through, no time proofed blade that could cut his brutal blood caked claw

=== Relationship to Biblical traditions ===
Some scholars have linked Grendel's descent from Cain to the monsters and giants of the Cain tradition. Alfred Bammesgerber (2008) looks closely at line 1266 where Grendel's ancestry is said to be the "misbegotten spirits" that sprang from Cain after he was cursed. He argues that the word in Old English geosceaftgasta should be translated "the great former creation of spirits".

=== Relationship to wider Germanic traditions ===
==== Identity as an eoten ====
In 1936, J. R. R. Tolkien's Beowulf: The Monsters and the Critics discussed Grendel and the dragon in Beowulf. Tolkien points out that while Grendel is the descendant of the Biblical Cain, he "cannot be dissociated from the creatures of northern myth". He notes that Cain is presented as the ancestor of beings such as eotenas and ylfe, which he equates with their Old Norse cognates of jötnar and álfar. He further argues that this blending of traditions is intentional and seen throughout the poem more generally. Grendel specifically is described as both an eoten and a þyrs, cognate with Old Norse: jötunn and þurs respectively; it has been proposed that the poet and the audience of the poem would have seen Grendel as belonging to this same group of beings as the jötnar of Scandinavian tradition. While jötnar in Old Norse accounts are highly diverse, lacking a single physical appearance, and best thought of as a social grouping, some broadly shared traits have been identified such as living on the periphery of the world, outside society. In both Old Norse and Old English accounts, these borders between the realms of humanity and those of supernatural beings are often marked by water, such as rivers or the surface of lakes. This is notably consistent with Grendel's depiction as living in marshes and Maxims II, which identifies fens as the characteristic living place for þyrsas.

==== Other ====
Katherine O'Keefe (1981) has suggested that Grendel resembles a berserker, because of numerous associations that seem to point to this possibility.

Sonya R. Jensen (1998) argues for an identification between Grendel and Agnar, son of Ingeld, and suggests that the tale of the first two monsters is actually the tale of Ingeld, as mentioned by Alcuin in the 790s. The tale of Agnar tells how he was cut in half by the warrior Bödvar Bjarki (Warlike little Bear), and how he died "with his lips separated into a smile". One major parallel between Agnar and Grendel would thus be that the monster of the poem has a name perhaps composed of a combination of the words gren and daelan. The poet may be stressing to his audience that Grendel "died laughing", or that he was gren-dael[ed] or "grin-divid[ed]", after having his arm torn off at the shoulder by Beowulf, whose name means bee-wolf or bear.

== Other interpretations and discussions ==
Peter Dickinson (1979) argued that seeing as the considered distinction between man and beast at the time the poem was written was simply man's bipedalism, the given description of Grendel being man-like does not necessarily imply that Grendel is meant to be humanoid, going as far as stating that Grendel could easily have been a bipedal dragon.

Other scholars such as Sherman Kuhn (1979) have questioned Grendel's description as a monster, stating:

There are five disputed instances of āglǣca [three of which are in Beowulf, lines] 649, 1269, 1512 ... In the first ... the referent can be either Beowulf or Grendel. If the poet and his audience felt the word to have two meanings – monster and hero – the ambiguity would be troublesome; but if by āglǣca they understood a fighter, the ambiguity would be of little consequence, for battle was destined for both Beowulf and Grendel and both were fierce fighters (216–217).

== Place-names ==
Grendel likely features in English place names dating to the Anglo-Saxon period such as grendeles pytt ("Grendel's pit"), grendles mere ("Grendel's mere") and gryndeles syllen ("Grendel's bog"). It has been further noted that these places are often nearby, or are, watery places, such as lakes and marshes, or other locations away from human habitation.

== Depictions ==
Grendel appears in many other cultural works.

== Bibliography ==
=== Primary ===
- George, Jack (1997). Beowulf: A Student Edition.
- Heaney, Seamus (2012). Beowulf (9th ed.). New York: Norton. pp. 41–108. ISBN 978-0-393-91249-4.
- Heyne, Moriz (2018). Beówulf. Franklin Classics. ISBN 978-0341833826.
- Thorpe, Benjamin (1855). The Anglo-Saxon poems of Beowulf, the Scôp or Gleeman's tale, and The fight at Finnesburg; with a literal translation, notes, glossary, etc. Oxford Parker.
- Slade, Benjamin. "Beowulf". heorot.dk.

=== Secondary ===
- Abram, Christopher (20 December 2019). "At home in the fens with the Grendelkin". Dating Beowulf. Manchester University Press. pp. 120–144. ISBN 978-1-5261-3644-2.
- Bammesberger, A. (1 July 2008). "Grendel's Ancestry". Notes and Queries. 55 (3): 257–260. doi:10.1093/notesj/gjn112. ISSN 0029-3970.
- Dickinson, Peter; Anderson, Wayne (1979). The flight of dragons (First US ed.). New York: Harper & Row. ISBN 0060110740.
- Heide, Eldar (2014). "Contradictory cosmology in Old Norse myth and religion – but still a system?". Maal og Minne (in Norwegian). 106 (1). ISSN 1890-5455.
- Jakobsson, Ármann (2006). ""Where Do the Giants Live?"". Arkiv för nordisk filologi. 121: 101–112.
- Jensen, S. R. (1998). Beowulf and the Monsters. Sydney: ARRC.
- Jones, Gwyn (1972). Kings, Beasts and Heroes. London: Oxford University Press. ISBN 0-19-215181-9.
- Leneghan, Francis (April 2022). "Beowulf and the Hunt". Humanities. 11 (2): 36. doi:10.3390/h11020036. ISSN 2076-0787.
- Monikander, Anne (28 December 2006). "Borderland-stalkers and Stalking-horses Horse Sacrifice as Liminal Activity in the Early Iron Age". Current Swedish Archaeology. 14: 143–158. doi:10.37718/CSA.2006.07. ISSN 2002-3901. S2CID 193724505.
- Nicholson, Lewis E. (1963). An Anthology of Beowulf Criticism. Notre Dame, Indiana: University of Notre Dame Press.
- O'Keefe, Katherine O'Brian (1981). "Beowulf, Lines 702b-836: Transformations and the Limits of the Human". Texas Studies in Literature and Language. 23 (4): 484–494. ISSN 0040-4691. JSTOR 40754660.
- Semple, Sarah (2010). "Chapter 2, In the Open Air". Signals of Belief in Early England: Anglo-Saxon Paganism Revisited. Oxbow Books. ISBN 978-1-84217-395-4. JSTOR j.ctt1cd0nf9.9.
- Tolkien, J. R. R. (1936). "Beowulf: The Monsters and the Critics" (PDF). Proceedings of the British Academy. 22: 245–295.
- Tolkien, J. R. R. (2014). Beowulf: a translation and commentary. London: Harper Collins. ISBN 9780007590070.
- Williams, David (1982). Cain and Beowulf: A Study in Secular Allegory. Toronto: University of Toronto Press. ISBN 978-0802055194.
