= David Williams (medievalist) =

David Williams (1939–2015) was an expert on Medieval literature, as well as a college professor and department chair at McGill University. He has authored several books.

== Deformed Discourse ==
Williams's book Deformed Discourse: The Function of the Monster in Mediaeval Thought and Literature won the 1997 Raymond Klibansky Prize. In the book, "Williams explores the concept of monsters in the Middle Ages by examining its theological and philosophical roots and its symbolic function in mediaeval art and literature."

This large book was a logical follow-up to his smaller 1982 book, Cain and Beowulf: A Study in Secular Allegory, which draws on and elucidates the Cain tradition.
