= David Williams (rugby union, born 1894) =

- Born: David M. Williams c. 1894 Toowoomba, Queensland
- Died: c. 1959

Rugby union career
- Position: hooker
International career
Years	Team	Apps	(Points)
1913–14	Wallabies	4	(0)

David M. Williams (c. 1894 – c. 1959) was a rugby union player who represented Australia.

Williams, a hooker, was born in Toowoomba, Queensland and claimed a total of 4 international rugby caps for Australia.
