= The dragon (Beowulf) =

Dragon from the Beowulf poem

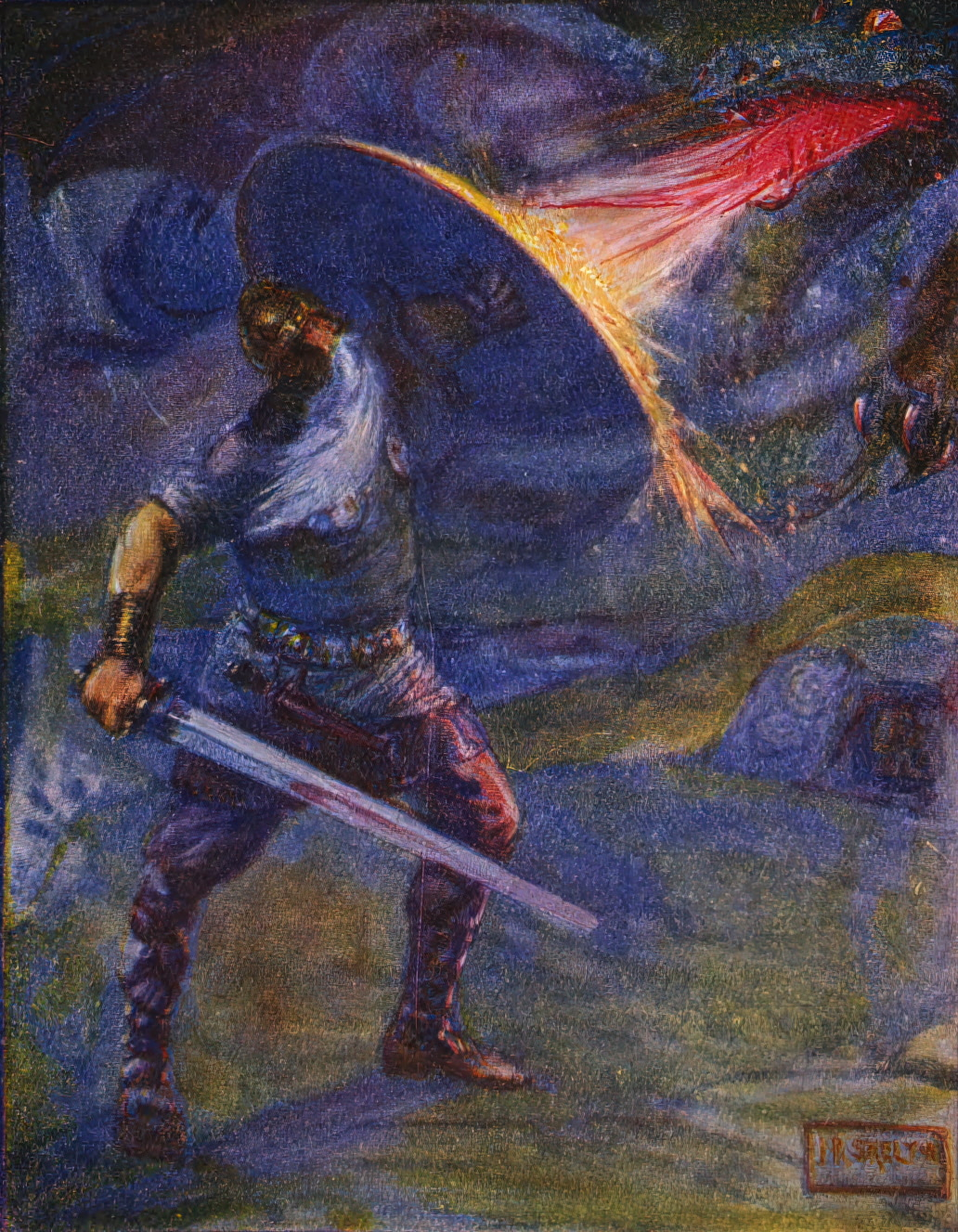
Beowulf battles his nemesis, the dragon, shown in a 1908 illustration by J. R. Skelton

The final act of the Anglo-Saxon poem Beowulf includes Beowulf's fight with a dragon, the third monster he encounters in the epic. On his return from Heorot, where he killed Grendel and Grendel's mother, Beowulf becomes king of the Geats and rules wisely for fifty years until a slave awakens and angers a dragon by stealing a jeweled cup from its lair. When the angry dragon mercilessly burns the Geats' homes (including Beowulf's) and lands, Beowulf decides to fight and kill the monster personally. He and his thanes climb to the dragon's lair where, upon seeing the beast, the thanes flee in terror, leaving only Wiglaf to battle at Beowulf's side. When the dragon wounds Beowulf fatally, Wiglaf attacks it with his sword, and Beowulf kills it with his dagger.

This depiction indicates the growing importance and stabilization of the modern concept of the dragon within European mythology. Beowulf is the first piece of English literature to present a dragonslayer. Although the Beowulf dragon exhibits many existing motifs common to Germanic tradition, the Beowulf poet was the first to combine features and present a distinctive fire-breathing dragon. The Beowulf dragon was adapted for Middle-earth in J. R. R. Tolkien's The Hobbit (1937), one of the forerunners of modern high fantasy.

The dragon fight, near the end of the poem, is foreshadowed in earlier scenes. The fight with the dragon symbolizes Beowulf's stand against evil and destruction, and, as the hero, he knows that failure will bring destruction to his people after many years of peace. The dragon itself acts as a mock "goldking"; one who sees attacking Beowulf's kingdom as suitable retribution for the theft of just a single cup. The scene is structured in thirds, ending with the deaths of the dragon and Beowulf.

== Story ==
After his battles against Grendel and Grendel's mother, Beowulf returns home and becomes king of the Geats. Fifty years pass with Beowulf in charge, when a local dragon is angered when a slave enters its lair and takes a cup from its treasure. The creature attacks the neighboring towns in revenge. Beowulf and a troop of men leave to find the dragon's lair. Beowulf tells his men to stay outside, that this fight is his alone, but the dragon proves strong and mortally wounds Beowulf. Meanwhile, his kinsman Wiglaf scolds the other members of the troop for not going in to help, before coming to Beowulf's aid. He cuts the dragon in the belly to reduce the flames, and Beowulf deals the fatal blow. In his death-speech, Beowulf nominates Wiglaf as his heir and asks for a monument to be built for him on the shoreline.

== Background ==
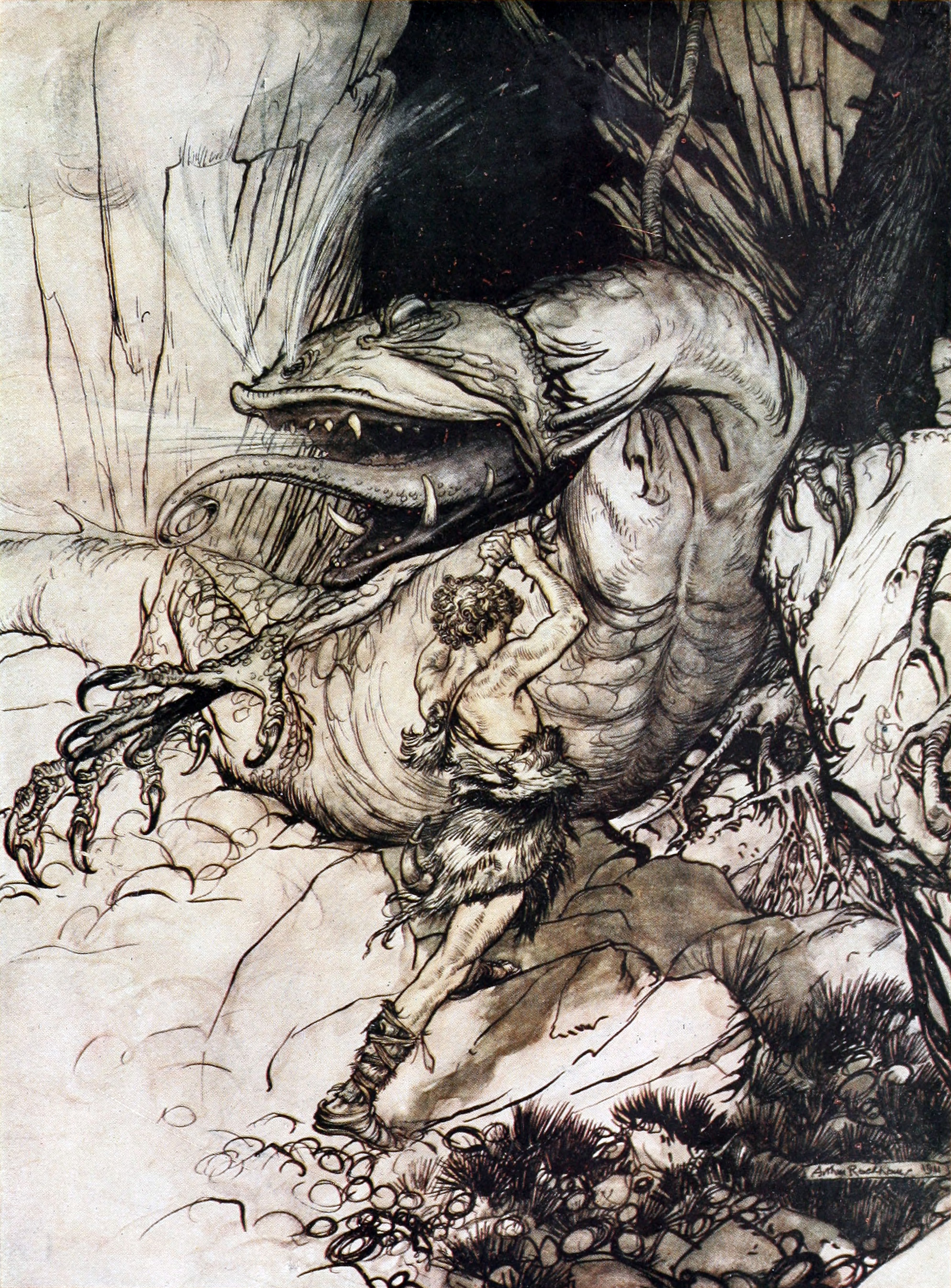
Sigurd and Fafnir by Arthur Rackham, from his 1911 illustrations for Richard Wagner's Siegfried and The Twilight of the Gods

Beowulf is the oldest extant heroic poem in English and the first to present a dragonslayer. The legend of the dragonslayer already existed in Norse sagas such as the tale of Sigurd and Fáfnir, and the Beowulf poet incorporates motifs and themes common to dragonlore in the poem. Beowulf is the earliest surviving piece of Anglo-Saxon literature to feature a dragon, and it is possible that the poet had access to similar stories from Germanic legend. Secular Germanic literature and the literature of Christian hagiography featured dragons and dragon fights. Although the dragons of hagiography were less fierce than the dragon in Beowulf, similarities exist in the stories such as presenting the journey to the dragon's lair, cowering spectators, and the sending of messages relaying the outcome of the fight.

The dragon with his hoard is a common motif in early Germanic literature with the story existing to varying extents in the Norse sagas, but it is most notable in the Völsunga saga and in Beowulf. Beowulf preserves existing medieval dragon-lore, most notably in the extended digression recounting Sigemund the Wælsing (paralleled to the Sigurd-Fáfnir tale). Nonetheless, comparative contemporary narratives did not have the complexity and distinctive elements written into Beowulf's dragon scene. Beowulf is a hero who previously killed two monsters. The scene includes extended flashbacks to the Geatish-Swedish wars, a detailed description of the dragon and the dragon-hoard, and ends with intricate funerary imagery.

Beowulf scholar J. R. R. Tolkien considered the dragon in Beowulf to be one of only two real dragons in northern European literature, writing of it, "dragons, real dragons, essential both to the machinery and the ideas of a poem or tale, are actually rare. In northern literature there are only two that are significant [...] we have but the dragon of the Völsungs, Fáfnir, and Beowulf's bane." Furthermore, Tolkien believes the Beowulf poet emphasizes the monsters Beowulf fights in the poem and claims the dragon is as much of a plot device as anything. Tolkien expands on Beowulf's dragon in his own fiction, which indicates the lasting impact of the Beowulf poem. Within the plot structure, however, the dragon functions differently in Beowulf than in Tolkien's fiction. The dragon fight ends Beowulf, while Tolkien uses the dragon motif (and the dragon's love for treasure) to trigger a chain of events in The Hobbit.

== Characterization ==
The Beowulf dragon is the earliest example in literature of the typical European dragon and first incidence of a fire-breathing dragon. The Beowulf dragon is described with Old English terms such as draca (dragon), and wyrm (reptile, or serpent), and as a creature with a venomous bite. Also, the Beowulf poet created a dragon with specific traits: a nocturnal, treasure-hoarding, inquisitive, vengeful, fire-breathing creature.

=== Christian origin ===
The dragon's fire is possibly symbolic of the hellfire of the devil, reminiscent of the leviathan in the Book of Job. In the Septuagint, Job's monster is characterized as a draco, and identified with the devil. Job's dragon would have been accessible to the author of Beowulf, as a Christian symbol of evil, the "great monstrous adversary of God, man and beast alike."

=== Pagan origin ===
A study of German and Norse texts reveals three typical narratives for the dragonslayer: a fight for the treasure, a battle to save the slayer's people, or a fight to free a woman. The characteristics of Beowulf's dragon appear to be specific to the poem, and the poet may have melded together dragon motifs to create a dragon with specific traits that weave together the complicated plot of the narrative. The poem's story within a story following Sigemund the Wælsing parallels Beowulf and the dragon, including the hoard of treasure and slaying with a sword. Scholars suggest the Sigemund digression derives from pre-Christian Germanic mythology, possibly of Frankish origin, which preceded or paralleled the Sigurd-Fáfnir tale as found in the Fáfnismál and Völsunga saga version of the story.

== Importance ==
The third act of the poem differs from the first two. In Beowulf's two earlier battles, Grendel and Grendel's mother are characterized as descendants of Cain: "[Grendel] had long lived in the land of monsters / since the creator cast them out / as the kindred of Cain" and seem to be humanoid: in the poet's rendition they can be seen as giants, trolls, or monsters. The dragon, therefore, is a stark contrast to the other two antagonists. Moreover, the dragon is more overtly destructive. He burns vast amounts of territory and the homes of the Geats: "the dragon began to belch out flames / and burn bright homesteads".

Beowulf's fight with the dragon has been described variously as an act of either altruism or recklessness. In contrast with the previous battles, the fight with the dragon occurs in Beowulf's kingdom and ends in defeat, whereas Beowulf fought the other monsters victoriously in a land distant from his home. The dragon fight is foreshadowed with earlier events: Scyld Shefing's funeral and Sigmund's death by dragon, as recounted by a bard in Hrothgar's hall. Beowulf scholar Alexander writes that the dragon fight likely signifies Beowulf's (and by extension, society's) battle against evil. The people's fate depend on the outcome of the fight between the hero and the dragon, and, as a hero, Beowulf must knowingly face death.

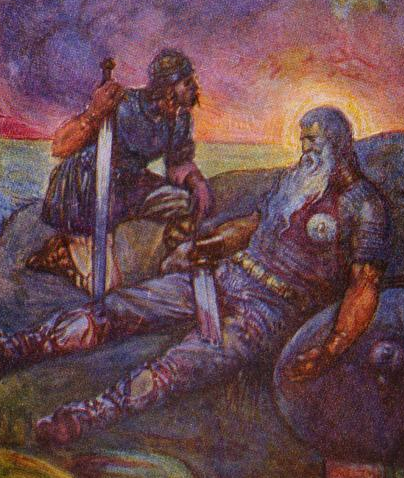
Wiglaf is the single warrior to return and witness the death of the hero. Illustration by J. R. Skelton, 1908

Beowulf's eventual death from the dragon presages "warfare, death, and darkness" for his Geats. The dragon's hoard symbolizes the vestige of an older society, now lost to wars and famine, left behind by a survivor of that period. His imagined elegy foreshadows Beowulf's death and elegy to come. Before he faces the dragon, Beowulf thinks of his past: his childhood and wars the Geats endured during that period, foreshadowing the future. At his death, peace in his lands will end, and his people will again suffer a period of war and hardship. An embattled society without "social cohesion" is represented by the avarice of the "dragon jealously guarding its gold hoard",and the elegy for Beowulf becomes an elegy for the entire culture. The dragon's hoard is representative of a people lost and antique, which is juxtaposed against the Geatish people, whose history is new and fleeting. As king of his people, Beowulf defends them against the dragon, and when his thanes desert him, the poem shows the disintegration of a "heroic society" which "depends upon the honouring of mutual obligations between lord and thane".

Wiglaf remains loyal to his king and stays to confront the dragon. The parallel in the story lies with the similarity to Beowulf's hero Sigemund and his companion: Wiglaf is a younger companion to Beowulf and, in his courage, shows himself to be Beowulf's successor. The presence of a companion is seen as a motif in other dragon stories, but the Beowulf poet breaks hagiographic tradition with the hero's suffering (hacking, burning, stabbing) and subsequent death. Moreover, the dragon is vanquished through Wiglaf's actions: although Beowulf dies fighting the dragon, the dragon dies at the hand of the companion.

The dragon battle is structured in thirds: the preparation for the battle, the events prior to the battle, and the battle itself. Wiglaf kills the dragon halfway through the scene, Beowulf's death occurs "after two-thirds" of the scene, and the dragon attacks Beowulf three times. Ultimately, as Tolkien writes in Beowulf: The Monsters and the Critics (1936), the death by dragon "is the right end for Beowulf," for he claims, "a man can but die upon his death-day".

== Critical reception ==
=== Before Tolkien ===
In 1918, William Witherle Lawrence argued in his article "The Dragon and His Lair in Beowulf" that the fight between Beowulf and the dragon tends to receive less critical attention than other portions of the poem, commenting that "Grendel and his dam have, as it were, become more beloved of the commentators". Conversely, Kemp Malone writes in "The Kenning in Beowulf" that Beowulf's fight with the dragon receives much critical attention, but that commentators fail to note that "the dragon was no fighter. Not that it refused to fight when challenged, but that it did not seek out Beowulf or anyone else. It left Beowulf to do the seeking out". In his 1935 work Beowulf and the Seventh Century, Ritchie Girvan writes that Beowulf should be seen as having some degree of historical accuracy despite the presence of a dragon in it; he argues that "Tales of dragons as well as a belief in dragons survived till recent times, and the popular mind is apt to accept with credulity stories of water-monsters. The stories, moreover, are often attached to real persons and localized precisely in time and place. The habit is so well known that examples are superfluous". Raymond Wilson Chambers, in his Beowulf: An Introduction to the Study of the Poem with a Discussion of the Stories of Offa and Finn, says that Beowulf's dragon acts like "the typical dragon of Old English proverbial lore" because he guards treasure. W. P. Ker criticized the inclusion of Beowulf's fight with the dragon and his subsequent death in the poem, writing "It is as if to the end of the Odyssey there had been added some later books telling in full of the old age of Odysseus, far from the sea, and his death at the hands of Telegonus".

=== Tolkien, 1936: The Monsters and the Critics ===
In his 1936 lecture Beowulf: The Monsters and the Critics, J. R. R. Tolkien noted that the dragon and Grendel are "constantly referred to in language which is meant to recall the powers of darkness which Christian men felt themselves to be encompassed. They are 'inmates of hell', 'adversaries of God', 'offspring of Cain', 'enemies of mankind'....And so Beowulf, for all that he moves in the world of the primitive Heroic Age of the Germans, nevertheless is almost a Christian knight". Tolkien is here quoting a passage from R. W. Chambers's essay "Beowulf and the 'Heroic Age' in England."

=== After Tolkien ===
Peter Gainsford noted in the article "The Deaths of Beowulf and Odysseus: Narrative Time and Mythological Tale Types" that "In the twenty-first century Beowulf does not lack for commentators to defend the literary merit of the dragon episode". Adrien Bonjour opined in 1953 that the dragon's "ultimate significance in the poem" remains a "mystery".

The poet Seamus Heaney, author of a major translation of Beowulf, suggests that Beowulf's attitude towards fighting the dragon reflects his "chthonic wisdom refined in the crucible of experience", that is there is already a "beyond-the-grave aspect" to his resoluteness. As Beowulf dies from his fight with the dragon, despite defeating it, James Parker of The Atlantic writes that "There is no transcendence in Beowulf, and no redemption [...] kill the dragon—but the dragon will get you anyway". Joan Acocella states in The New Yorker that "unlike Grendel and his mother, [the dragon] is less a monster than a symbol."

== Legacy ==
In From Homer to Harry Potter: A Handbook on Myth and Fantasy, Matthew Dickerson and David O'Hara argue that the Beowulf poet added the figure of the dragon to "the pot...that is ladled out of by most modern fantasy writers"; they argued that both numerous works with villainous dragons, as well as literature with benign dragons like the My Father's Dragon books and the Pern series by Anne McCaffrey, were influenced by Beowulf's dragon. Dickerson and O'Hara further elaborated that through its dragon, Beowulf turned the "notion of having a monstrous evil (and not mere human foes) as the enemy" into "a hallmark of modern fantasy" present in C. S. Lewis' Narnia books, Ursula K. Le Guin's Earthsea books, and the Thomas Covenant series by Stephen Donaldson.

J. R. R. Tolkien used the dragon story of Beowulf as a template for Smaug of The Hobbit; in each case, the dragon awakens upon the hoard being disturbed by one stealing a chalice and goes into a wrathful rampage until slain by another person. Aia Hussein of the National Endowment for the Humanities has written that the fight between Harry Potter and the Hungarian Horntail in Harry Potter and the Goblet of Fire (2000) by J. K. Rowling was influenced by the confrontation between the dragon and the title character in Beowulf.

In the 2007 film version, the dragon is Grendel's younger half-brother as he is the son of the latter's mother and Beowulf whom he ironically ends up killing in the end of the movie.

== Sources ==
- Alexander, Michael (2003) [1973]. Beowulf: a verse translation. London: Penguin. ISBN 978-0-14-044931-0.
- Clark, George (2003) [1998]. "The Hero and the Theme". In Bjork, Robert E.; Niles, John D. (eds.). A Beowulf Handbook. University of Nebraska Press. ISBN 978-0-8032-6150-1.
- Crossley-Holland, Kevin (1999). O'Donohue, Heather (ed.). Beowulf: The fight at Finnsburh. Oxford University Press. ISBN 978-0-19-283320-4.
- Evans, Jonathan (2003) [2000]. "The Dragon-Lore of Middle-earth: Tolkien and Old English and Old Norse Tradition". In Clark, George; Timmons, Daniel (eds.). J.R.R. Tolkien and his literary resonances: views of Middle-earth. Greenwood Press. ISBN 0-313-30845-4.
- Heaney, Seamus (2001). Beowulf: A New Verse Translation. Norton. ISBN 978-0-393-32097-8.
- Rauer, Christine (2003). Beowulf and the Dragon: Parallels and Analogues. Cambridge: Brewer. ISBN 0-85991-592-1.
- Tolkien, J. R. R. (25 November 1936). "Beowulf: The Monsters and the Critics". Sir Israel Gollancz Lecture 1936. Archived from the original on 3 November 2009.
