= Sellic Spell =

Short text by J.R.R. Tolkien in English and Old English

"Sellic Spell" (pronounced [ˈselːiːtʃ ˈspeɫː]; an Old English phrase meaning "wondrous tale" and taken from the poem Beowulf) is a short prose text available in Modern and Old English redactions, written by J. R. R. Tolkien in a creative attempt to reconstruct the folktale underlying the narrative in the first two thousand lines of the Old English poem Beowulf. Among other things, it seeks to clarify and integrate a number of narrative strands in the early medieval poem.

== Content ==
The resulting text is a loose variant of the Skilful Companions type of folktale, in which each of several characters (two or three in Tolkien's text, depending on the redaction) has a valuable but specific skill. Unlike in folktales of that type, however, the skills of Tolkien's characters do not supplement each other in the resolution of the narrative problem. Tolkien's recasting of the material also incorporates the sluggish youth motif and the abandonment of the hero at the waterfall, both elements found in the analogous Old Icelandic Grettis saga. The suggestion that a waterfall like that of Grettis saga was part of the original setting of the pool of monsters in Beowulf was made by W.W. Lawrence in 1912. In an article in Tolkien Studies (2016), Paul Acker shows that Tolkien's principal scholarly resource in recasting the tale was R. W. Chambers's 1921 work, Beowulf: An Introduction to the Study of the Poem.

== Dating and composition ==
The text's editor, Christopher Tolkien, dates much of the composition and revision of the tale to the early 1940s on the basis of datable content on the versos of the manuscript leaves. The tale was actually accepted for publication in the forties by Gwyn Jones, who had already published "The Lay of Aotrou and Itroun" for Tolkien in The Welsh Review; but the collapse of the latter in 1948 prevented "Sellic Spell" from appearing for almost seventy years.

In a note discovered among his papers, J.R.R. Tolkien claims to have "[put] it first into Old English". However, Christopher Tolkien observes that this sequence of events is inconsistent with the textual evidence, since the earliest manuscript of the Modern English text was revised into a form that corresponds in several places to the Old English text, which was thus probably based on a version of the Modern English tale. The Old English version as published is furthermore incomplete, breaking off before either of the two companions faces Grendel. The Modern English text exists in three (partial) manuscripts and two typescripts; Christopher Tolkien published the text of the later typescript along with the Old English translation and a discussion of the tale's revision history in 2014.

== See also ==
- Bear's Son Tale
- Tolkien and the medieval
