= Bear's Son Tale =

Folk tale classification type

"Bear's Son Tale" (German: das Märchen vom Bärensohn, Bärensohnmärchen) refers to an analogous group of narratives that, according to Friedrich Panzer's 1910 thesis, represent the fairy tale material reworked to create the Anglo-Saxon poem Beowulf's first part, the Grendel-kin Story. Panzer collected over 200 analogue tales mostly from Eurasia.

The Bear's Son motif (B635.1) is exhibited only generally, not reliably. Exceptions include versions of "Jean de l'Ours", and the Grimms' fairy tale "Strong Hans" or "Der Starke Hans". Beowulf does not explicitly reveal a bear origin for its hero, but his name and great strength connect him to the animal closely.

Most of the tales are formally catalogued as either Aarne-Thompson-Uther folktale type 301, "The Three Stolen Princesses" (Note: "The Three Stolen Princesses" is the standardized title as catalogued by Uther. However, Stith Thompson in The Folklore (1977) had referred to Type 301 variously as "Bear's son and John the Bear" pp. 32–33, 183 and "Princesses" at pp. 52, 287, Index.) (Note: The third revision of the Aarne-Thompson classification system, made in 2004 by German folklorist Hans-Jörg Uther, subsumed both subtypes AaTh 301A and AaTh 301B into the new type ATU 301.) or ATU type 650A, "Strong John" or "Starker Hans". Their plotlines are similar, with some differences; in the latter, the hero is subjected to tests by ordeal.

"Bear's Son Tale" has thus become only an informal term for tale type classification in folkloristics, but scholars in Beowulf criticism continue to assert the usefulness of the term in their studies.

== Core characteristics ==
Studies comparing the poem Beowulf to the Bear's Son Tale see these common core characteristics: a hero is raised by or descended from a bear, with bear-like strength. He and companions must guard a dwelling against a monster (which Panzer calls "Der Dämon im Waldhaus"). The companions are defeated, but the hero wounds the creature, sending him to flight. In pursuit, the hero descends into a netherworld or underground domain. The hero often has a second round of adversaries.

Other common elements are a captive princess, betrayal by a close friend or ally of the hero, and magical weapons. Some of these elements are paralleled in the Grendel story in Beowulf, others are not.

== Parallel elements ==
Some of the traits in the Bear's Son Tale regarded as being paralleled in Beowulf will be explained further below.

=== Betrayal ===
The betrayal element (F601.3) transpires in the fairy tale version (see Jean de l'Ours) as follows: After the hero descends to the world underground and rescues the princess, he is betrayed by his companions, who instead of pulling him up by a rope, either cut it or release it so he falls to the bottom. The parallel to this in Beowulf, (according to Panzer and Chambers) is that after seeing blood come up from Grendel's mere (lake), the Danes only wait until nones (3 PM), and then they abandon the hero at the lake.

=== Magic weapon ===
The hero in the Bear's Son Tale may have a magic sword (motif D1081, usually found in Type 301A) or a walking-stick (Type 301B). (Note: To be more precise, the magic sword given to the hero by a princess is more typical of Type 301A (the "fruit d'or" type), but it usually lacks the "bear's son" motif. A heavy iron walking-stick forged by himself is the weapon of the hero in Jean de l'Ours (John of the Bear), which is Type 301B. This is shown by example tales and analysis by symbols given by Delarue. In some Mexican versions, the weapon is a machete.) The magic sword in Beowulf is supposedly represented by the sword of the "ancient giants' sword" (ealdsweord eotenisc) that Beowulf discovered in Grendel's mother's lair.

== Elements lacking in Beowulf ==
Some significant elements of the folktale missing in Beowulf (listed by Chambers) are: the captive princess(es), one of whom he marries, the hero's rescue by a "miraculous helper", his return to the Upper World under an assumed identity, and his retribution against his treacherous companions.

=== Princess ===
The princess or three princesses to be rescued are lacking in Beowulf, (Note: The type 301, "The Three Stolen Princesses" to which Jean de l'Ours tales belong typically feature three. In Der Starke Hans there is one princess.) but this absence has been rationalized by W. W. Lawrence, who theorized that romantic love elements are superfluous and out-of-place in historical epics and had to be truncated.

== Elements in Beowulf not in folktale ==
Among elements considered vital to the epic are the loss of the ogre/demon's arm, and the trail of blood which leads the hero to the demon's lair (Lawrence (1928), p. 175, cited by Barakat (1967), pp. 1–2). These are not paralleled in any obvious way in the Bear's Son Tale.

=== Grendel's severed arm ===
Regarding Beowulf wrenching Grendel's arm off, Robert A. Barakat stated that no counterpart was to be found in the Bear' Son Tale of "Juan del Oso" (Spanish version of Jean de l'Ours). (Note: Bakarat refers to it English as "John of the Bear", but he gives the Spanish titles for his Mexican versions as well.) This was because there was no mention of "actual physical damage [Juan] inflicted" on the devil during the barehanded wrestling phase. However, Juan did cut off one of the devil's ears afterwards with his weapon.

For a folktale analogue to Grendel's severed arm, commentators have looked on Celtic (Irish) tale of "The Hand and Child" type. The parallel had been recognized already in the 19th century by several writers, (Note: Ludwig Laistner (1889), II, p. 25; Stopford Brooke, I, p. 120; Albert S. Cook (1899) pp. 154–156.) but Carl Wilhelm von Sydow is generally credited with developing the analysis which took notice.

=== Trail of blood ===
Beowulf determines Grendel's lair by following a trail of blood. Although this is not specifically mirrored in the Bear's Son Tale, the hero is able to track the adversary to a hole in the ground (or a well), and a trail of blood has been speculated. (Note: Barakat only states "the devil must have left a trail"; it is unclear if he meant an implicit fact the storyteller did not bother to articulate or a fact that used to be explicit but lost in transmission.) Chambers found that an Icelandic Bear's Son Tale, "Bjarndrengur" ("Bear-boy") parallels this exactly, and Bear-boy and his companions follow the blood-trail of the giant who had been grabbed by the beard but who has torn away. (Note: Chambers spells it "Bjarnrengur". Chambers also registers a Faroese folktale that is analogous, in which the heroe is called "Øskudólgur", or "ash-raker", a version of Askeladden or male Cinderella.)

== History and reception ==
Friedrich Panzer's monumental study, Studien zur germanischen Sagengeschichte, Part I: Beowulf, sought to prove that Beowulf was an eighth century Anglo-Saxon reworking of the "Bear's son" motif, which has been present since antiquity and widely disseminated. Later, the Panzer hypothesis on Beowulf was supported by W. W. Lawrence and R. W. Chambers, who elucidated and expanded on it.

John F. Vickrey, who took up the thesis in 2009, wrote that there had been very few studies focusing on the folkloric origins of Beowulf for 40 years previous to his writing. (Note: Among the "honorable exceptions", those who discussed "Bear's son" were John D. Niles (1999), "Pagan Survivals and Popular Belief", pp. 131, 140–141 n6; and Fulk an Cain, History of Old English Literature, p. 203.)

J. R. R. Tolkien was very interested in the idea of the bear-son folktale underlying Beowulf, and pointed to several minor but illuminating characteristics supporting the assumption: Beowulf's uncouthness and appetite, the strength of his grip, and his refusal to use weapons against Grendel. He also saw Unferth as a link between folktale and legend, his (covert) roles as smith and treacherous friend standing behind his gift to Beowulf of the "hafted blade" that fails.

Critics of Panzer's thesis have argued however that many of the incidents he sees as specific to the Bear's Son Story are in fact generic folktale elements; and that a closer analogue to Beowulf is to be found in Celtic mythology and the story of the 'Monstrous Arm'.

== Tale group ==
Panzer lists some 202 examples of Bear's Son Tales in his study, (Note: Panzer's own list at the beginning is numbered up to 202, 184 from Europe, numbers 185–200 from Asia, one from Africa, and one from Brazil. Barakat credits Panzer with 221 examples.)

The "Strong John" subgroup includes more than 400 tales counted in the Baltic-Scandinavia area. The tale remained current in French Canada, but its original may no longer survive in France.

=== North American examples ===
Panzer's list did not include any North American examples, but "Bear's son" tales have been known to have disseminated to native North American populations, and these are considered to have European origins, an example being the Assiniboine story published as "The Underground Journey" by Robert H. Lowie in 1909.

=== Some examples of ATU 301 tales ===
- Fehérlófia
- The Son of a Horse
- The Adventures of Massang

== Other literary examples ==
There are several other literary examples perceived as being related to Bear's Son Tales.

One example regarded as particularly important to the Beowulf study is the bear-hero Böðvar Bjarki who appears as a companion to Hrólf Kraki in the legendary saga Hrólfs saga kraka.

Another literary incident is in the Grettis saga, or the saga of Grettir the Strong.

Also, there have been attempts to associate King Arthur with the bear, and thus with the Bear's Son Tales. An attempt to make the connection by asserting Arthur's name as based on the root arth- meaning "bear" in Welsh has been refuted. Therefore, a more elaborate explanation has been advanced, which postulates Arthur's prototype to be the mythological Arcturus "guardian of the bear" of constellation lore.

Odysseus in the cave of Polyphemus has also been related to the theme.

== Psychoanalytic interpretations ==
For psychoanalysis, the bear-parents represent the parents seen in their animal (sexual) guise – the bear as the dark, bestial aspect of the parental archetype. Their offspring, represented by Tolkien in Sellic Spell as "a surly, lumpish boy...slow to learn the speech of the land", is the undersocialised child. And in the underground struggle, Géza Róheim argued, we find a representation of the primal scene, as encapsulated in the infantile unconscious.

== See also ==
- Archaic mother
- Beowulf, sources and analogues
- Feral children in mythology and fiction
- Mowgli
- Nekyia
- Kintarō, Japanese folk hero raised by bear
