= Kevin Kiernan (scholar) =

American linguist

Kevin Kiernan is an American scholar of Anglo-Saxon literature. Kiernan is the editor of the Electronic Beowulf and an acknowledged expert on the Beowulf manuscript. Kiernan is the T. Marshall Hahn Sr. Professor of Arts and Sciences Emeritus at the University of Kentucky. He was inducted into the University of Kentucky College of Arts and Sciences Hall of Fame in 2015.

== Academic interests ==
Kiernan is active in the study of Beowulf and the Beowulf manuscript, and in the digital humanities, which combined in his Electronic Beowulf.

From early on in his academic career, Kiernan expressed doubt in received theory on the poem and the manuscript, and at this time, the early 1980s, the dating of the Beowulf manuscript was an important topic in Anglo-Saxon scholarship. In general, Kiernan argued in Beowulf and the Beowulf Manuscript, a monograph which attracted much attention, scholars have emended the manuscript too easily and have thus place too little faith in its readings. Theories of lengthy oral transmission of the poem have caused scholars to emend individual readings, even filling up what they perceived as lacunae in the text if they deemed that the metrics or the contents were faulty. Kiernan argued that the poem (whose sole surviving manuscript is reliably dated to around 1000 CE) is most likely from the early 11th century, rather than the late 10th century, and may well have been contemporary. That is to say, its scribes, rather than slavish and sometimes sloppy copyists of an earlier text, could have been close to a contemporary poet who created or recreated the poem. Kiernan sees the conquest of the English by Danish prince Cnut the Great in 1016 as a reason for the overwhelming interest in the Danish throne displayed in the poem. In addition, he claimed that the language used in the poem was very much a contemporary language rather than the archaic language claimed by earlier editors and critics. The latter point was supported by a linguistic analysis done by Joseph Tuso, who compared the poem's diction with three important contemporary texts.

Kiernan's proposed 11th-century origin of the poem did not go unchallenged, but even critics such as Joseph Trahern who didn't accept this proposition praised Beowulf and the Beowulf Manuscript as "an impressive and valuable book that provides a wealth of paleographic and codicological information, [which] corrects a good deal of earlier scholarship, and clarifies a number of questions concerning the manuscript through a new and first-hand description of it". Reviewing Kiernan's monograph together with The Dating of Beowulf (a collection of essays including one by Kiernan, edited by Colin Chase, 1981), Trahern concluded that the two books narrowed the dating for Beowulf and pushed it closer to the actual production of the manuscript.

A further critique of accepted scholarship on the manuscript came with The Thorkelin Transcripts of Beowulf in 1986, which challenged the traditional account of the transcriptions made for and by Grímur Jónsson Thorkelin, an Icelandic-Danish scholar who was the first to transcribe the manuscript in the British Museum. The received history had been Kemp Malone's, who had criticized the first of these two transcriptions, made by a clerk of the museum in 1787; according to Malone, that clerk (James Matthews, identified by Kiernan) had made many errors. Kiernan, however, after extensive research in the Danish National Archives in Copenhagen, argued that Matthews's lack of knowledge of Old English in fact was a bonus: since he came to the manuscript without prejudice, he copied what he saw, and any errors he made were systematic misreadings. Thorkelin, however, had a knack of attempting to read (that is, interpret) what he saw, thereby silently amending what he considered to be faulty readings. Thorkelin A (as Matthews's version is now called) is therefore much more reliable than Thorkelin B, and in addition comparison between A and B indicates the ongoing deterioration of the manuscript, whose edges had been charred during the 1731 fire at the Cotton library, then in the Ashburnham House. Tom Shippey, in a review of Kiernan's book, called it "an essential tool, now, for the study of the poem".

Since his retirement, Kiernan has lived on St. Simons Island, Georgia. In addition to continuing his work on medieval topics he has published on the archaeology of the Georgia coast, in particular on WPA archaeologist Preston Holder.

== Electronic Beowulf ==
Electronic Beowulf is a digital facsimile edition of the poem, and the project was started by Kiernan and Paul Szarmach (of Western Michigan University) as part of the effort of the British Library, which holds the manuscript, of increasing access to its holdings. It uses fiber optics and an electronic camera; the goal of these technologies was to render visible the many letters and parts of letters obscured by the damage done to the manuscript in the 1731 fire. Ultra-violet light is used to verify erasures by scribes.

Kiernan edited the electronic edition, published by the British Library and available on CD-ROM since the second and third editions (2011); the first was published in 1999 as a free download. It contains high-definition images and a hypertext dictionary, as well as four early transcriptions and a modern one, plus an edition of the text; the early transcriptions are the two made for and by Thorkelin (late 1780s), John Josias Conybeare (1817), and Frederic Madden (1824). Comparison between the transcriptions shows the ongoing deterioration of the charred and brittle edges of the manuscript. A reviewer of the third edition for the Digital Medievalist noted that while "this new update offers Old English researchers and students a wealth of resources—and beautiful new high-resolution images", its interface, using HTML and JavaScript code and Java applets is "rather dated", a critique already offered for the second edition by William Kilbride of the University of York. Nonetheless, Kilbride noted, "the effort to achieve this has been phenomenal, but the result is truly staggering. Beowulf scholars and students of Old English now have unimaginable riches at their fingertips".

== Education ==
Kiernan received his bachelor's in English from Fairfield University in 1967 and both his master's and doctorate in medieval studies from Case Western Reserve University in 1970.
