= Beowulf: The Monsters and the Critics =

1936 lecture by J. R. R. Tolkien

Title page of "Beowulf: The Monsters and the Critics", 1936

"Beowulf: The Monsters and the Critics" was a 1936 lecture given by J. R. R. Tolkien on literary criticism on the Old English heroic epic poem Beowulf. It was first published as a paper in the Proceedings of the British Academy, and has since been reprinted in many collections.

Tolkien argues that the original poem has almost been lost under the weight of the scholarship on it; that Beowulf must be seen as a poem, not just as a historical document; and that the quality of its verse and its structure give it a powerful effect. He rebuts suggestions that the poem is an epic or exciting narrative, likening it instead to a strong masonry structure built of blocks that fit together. He points out that the poem's theme is a serious one, mortality, and that the poem is in two parts: the first on Beowulf as a young man, defeating Grendel and his mother; the second on Beowulf in old age, going to his death fighting the dragon.

The work has been praised by critics including the poet and Beowulf translator Seamus Heaney. Michael D. C. Drout called it the most important article ever written about the poem. Scholars of Anglo-Saxon agree that the work was influential, transforming the study of Beowulf.

== Overview ==
J. R. R. Tolkien's essay "Beowulf: The Monsters and the Critics", initially delivered as the Sir Israel Gollancz Memorial Lecture at the British Academy on 25 November 1936, and first published as a paper in the Proceedings of the British Academy that same year, is regarded as a formative work in modern Beowulf studies. In it, Tolkien speaks against critics who play down the monsters in the poem, namely Grendel, Grendel's mother, and the dragon, in favour of using Beowulf solely as a source for Anglo-Saxon history. Tolkien argues that rather than being merely extraneous, these elements are key to the narrative and should be the focus of study. In doing so he drew attention to the previously neglected literary qualities of the poem and argued that it should be studied as a work of art, not just as a historical document. Later critics such as Hugh Magennis, who agree with Tolkien on this point, have cited him to defend their arguments.

The essay is an edited version of a series of lectures that Tolkien delivered to Oxford undergraduates in the 1930s. Notes for these lectures exist in two manuscript versions published together in 2002 as Beowulf and the Critics, edited by Michael D. C. Drout; these offer some insight into the development of Tolkien's thinking on the poem, especially his much-quoted metaphor of the material of the poem as a tower. "Beowulf: The Monsters and the Critics" is available in various collections, including the 1983 The Monsters and the Critics, and Other Essays edited by Christopher Tolkien.

== Tolkien's argument ==
=== Rebuttal of earlier critics ===
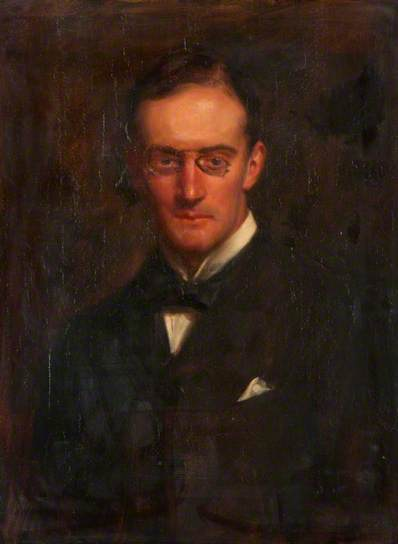
Tolkien's essay repeatedly responds to comments by William Paton Ker. Late 19th century portrait by Johnston Forbes-Robertson

Tolkien begins by noting that the original book has almost been lost under the extensive "literature" (his scare quotes) on the subject. He explains that Beowulf had mainly been quarried as "an historical document", and that most of the praise and censure of the poem was due to beliefs that it was "something that it was not – for example, primitive, pagan, Teutonic, an allegory (political or mythical), or most often, an epic;" or because the scholar would have liked it to be something else, such as "a heathen heroic lay, a history of Sweden, a manual of Germanic antiquities, or a Nordic Summa Theologica." Tolkien gives an allegory of a man who inherits a field full of stone from an old hall. He builds a tower with some of it, but when people find the stones are older than the tower, they pull it down "to look for hidden carvings and inscriptions".

Tolkien quotes at length what the scholar W. P. Ker thought of Beowulf, namely that "there is nothing much in the story", and that "the great beauty, the real value, of Beowulf is in its dignity of style". Tolkien notes that Ker's opinion had been a powerful influence in favour of a paradoxical contrast between the poem's supposed defect in speaking of monsters, and (in Tolkien's words) its agreed "dignity, loftiness in converse, and well-wrought finish". Tolkien cites other critics, such as Raymond Wilson Chambers and Ritchie Girvan, who objected to the poem's "wilderness of dragons" and its unworthy choice of theme. Tolkien finds it improbable that "a mind lofty and thoughtful", as evidenced by the quality of the poetry, "would write more than three thousand lines (wrought to a high finish) on matter that is really not worth serious attention". He notes that heroic human stories had been held to be superior to myth, but argues that myth has a special value: "For myth is alive at once and in all its parts, and dies before it can be dissected." Finally Tolkien states directly "We do not deny the worth of the hero by accepting Grendel and the dragon."

=== Man in a hostile world ===
In Tolkien's view, the poem is essentially about a "man at war with the hostile world, and his inevitable overthrow in Time". The underlying tragedy is man's brief mortal life. Grendel and the dragon are identified as enemies of a Christian God, unlike the monsters encountered by Odysseus on his travels. What had happened is that Northern courage, exultant, defiant in the face of inevitable defeat by "Chaos and Unreason" (Tolkien cites Ker's words), fuses with a Christian faith and outlook. The Beowulf poet uses both what he knew to be the old heroic tradition, darkened by distance in time, along with the newly acquired Christian tradition. The Christian, Tolkien notes, is "hemmed in a hostile world", and the monsters are evil spirits: but as the transition was incomplete in the poem, the monsters remain real and the focus remains "an ancient theme: that man, each man and all men, and all their works shall die".

Tolkien returns to the monsters, and regrets we know so little about pre-Christian English mythology; he resorts instead to Icelandic myth, which he argues must have had a similar attitude to monsters, men and gods. The Northern gods, like men, are doomed to die. The Southern (Roman and Greek) pagan gods were immortal, so to Tolkien (a Christian), the Southern religion "must go forward to philosophy or relapse into anarchy": death and the monsters are peripheral. But the Northern myths, and Beowulf, put the monsters, mortality and death in the centre. Tolkien is therefore very interested in the contact of Northern and Christian thought in the poem, where the scriptural Cain is linked to eotenas (giants) and ylfe (elves), not through confusion but "an indication of the precise point at which an imagination, pondering old and new, was kindled". The poem is, Tolkien states, "an historical poem about the pagan past, or an attempt at one", obviously not with modern ideas of "literal historical fidelity". The poet takes an old plot (a marauding monster troubling the Scylding court) and paints a vivid picture of the old days, for instance using the Old Testament image of the shepherd patriarchs of Israel in the folces hyrde (people's shepherd) of the Danes.

=== Structure: youth versus age ===
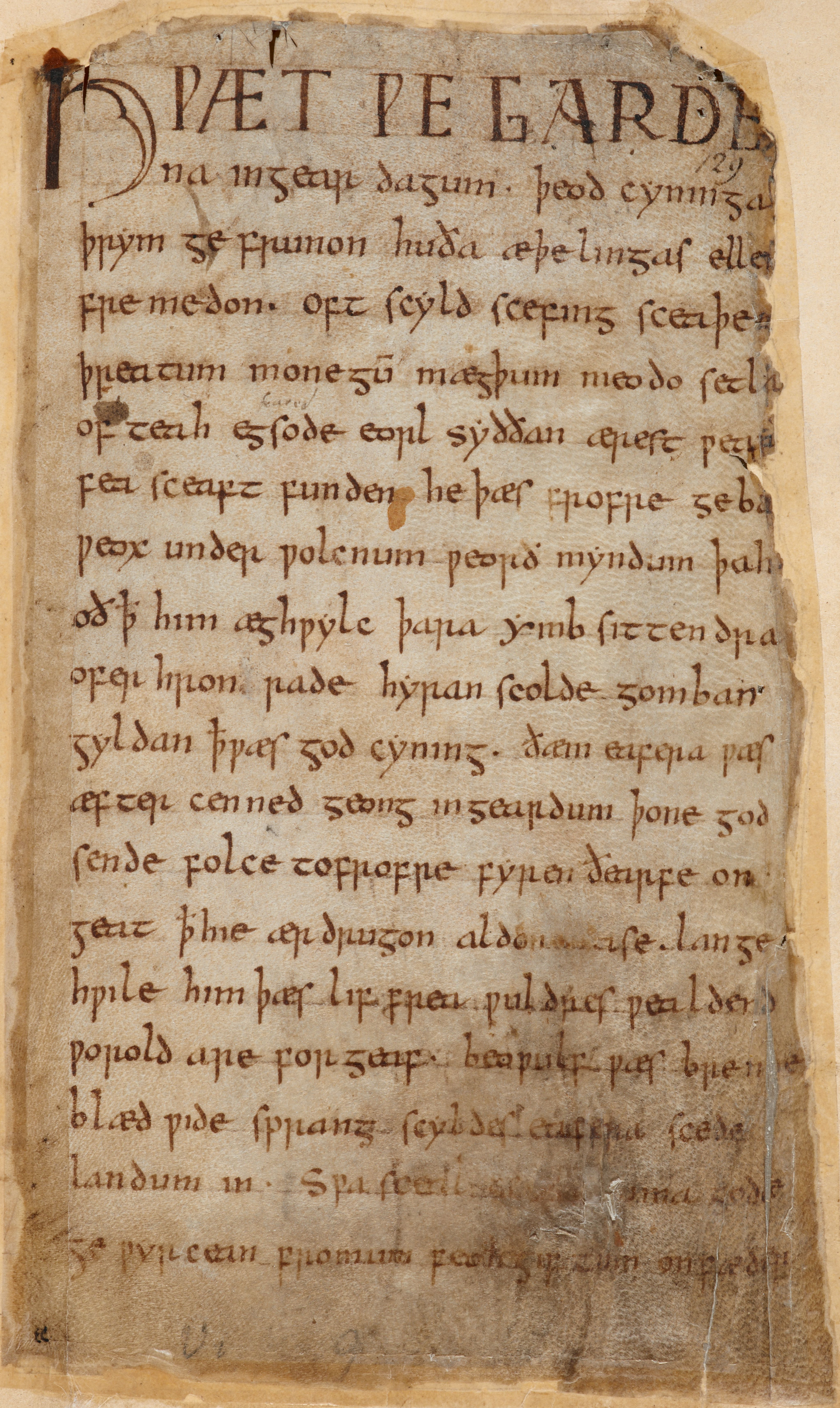
First folio of the Beowulf manuscript, c. 975-1025

The general structure of the poem is then clear, writes Tolkien. "It is essentially a balance, an opposition of ends and beginnings. In its simplest terms it is a contrasted description of two moments in a great life, rising and setting; an elaboration of the ancient and intensely moving contrast between youth and age, first achievement and final death." Part A (youth) is lines 1 to 2199; part B (age) is lines 2200 to 3182 (the end).

A secondary division of the poem occurs, Tolkien writes, at line 1887, after which all the earlier story is summarized, so a complete account of Beowulf's tragedy is given between 1888 and the end, but without the account of the gloomy court of Heorot, or of the contrast between the young Beowulf and the old Hrothgar.

The poem's metre, too, is founded on a balance of two halves to each line, "more like masonry than music". Tolkien argues that the poem is not meant to be an exciting narrative, nor a romantic story, but a word-picture, "a method and structure that ... approaches rather to sculpture or painting. It is a composition not a tune." Far from being weakly structured, it "is curiously strong".

It is not an 'epic', nor even a magnified 'lay'. No terms borrowed from Greek or other literatures exactly fit: there is no reason why they should. Though if we must have a term, we should choose rather 'elegy'. It is an heroic-elegiac poem; and in a sense all its first 3,136 lines are the prelude to a dirge.

=== A singular effect ===
Tolkien takes a moment to dismiss another criticism, that monsters should not have been made to appear in both halves. He replies he can see the point of no monsters, but not in complaining about their mere numbers; the poet could not, he argues, have balanced Beowulf's rise to fame through a war in Frisia, against death by dragon. Similarly, he dismisses notions that the poem is primitive: it is instead a late poem, using materials left over from a vanished age:

When new Beowulf was already antiquarian, in a good sense, and it now produces a singular effect. For it is now to us itself ancient; and yet its maker was telling of things already old and weighted with regret, and he expended his art in making keen that touch upon the heart which sorrows have that are both poignant and remote. If the funeral of Beowulf moved once like the echo of an ancient dirge, far-off and hopeless, it is to us as a memory brought over the hills, an echo of an echo. There is not much poetry in the world like this;

Tolkien finishes by arguing that Beowulf "has its own individual character, and peculiar solemnity;" and would still be powerful even if it came from some unknown time and place; but that in fact its language, Old English,

has still essential kinship with our own, it was made in this land, and moves in our northern world beneath our northern sky, and for those who are native to that tongue and land, it must ever call with a profound appeal – until the dragon comes.

== Reception ==
=== Scholars ===
Scholars and critics agree on the work's wide influence. Tom Shippey wrote that the essay "was seized upon eagerly, even gratefully, by generations of critics". Alvin A. Lee wrote that "Tolkien's manifesto and interpretation have had more influence on readers than any other single study, even though it has been challenged on just about every one of its major points." Seth Lerer wrote that the essay "may well be the originary piece of modern Beowulf criticism. ... The strategies ... control the fundamental assumptions of Old English scholarship for the next fifty years." R.D. Fulk commented that "No one denies the historical importance of this lecture. ... opening the way to the formalist principles that played such a vital role in the subsequent development of further Beowulf scholarship. ... the methodology ... remains a model for emulation." Bruce Mitchell and Fred C. Robinson call it in their Beowulf, An Edition (1998) "the most influential literary criticism of the poem ever written". George Clark calls it "The most influential critical essay on the poem", stating it without qualification or justification as a known fact. Michael Lapidge similarly names it "his widely influential critical discussion of the poem".

The scholar and translator Roy Liuzza commented that Tolkien's essay "is usually credited with re-establishing the fabulous elements and heroic combats at the center of the modern reader's appreciation of the poem." Liuzza at once went on to write, however, that "the separation of the poem into 'mythical' and 'historical' elements is a false dichotomy". He argues that if myth can condense and hold the deepest sources of tension between self and the social order, and dramatises current ideologies by projecting them into the past, then even the hero Beowulf's mythic fights are at the same time throwing light on society and history.

The historian Patrick Wormald wrote of the essay: "it would be no exaggeration to describe [it] as one of the most influential works of literary criticism of that century, and since which nothing in Beowulf studies has been quite the same." However, Wormald continues: "The arguments of Tolkien's paper were not universally accepted, and some of its effects would perhaps have been disowned by the author, but its general impact could be summarized by saying that most critics have learnt to take the Beowulf poet a great deal more seriously". Wormald added that

Tolkien argued powerfully that, for the Germanic mentality that gave birth to the myth of Ragnarök, the monsters of the poem were the only appropriate enemies for a great hero, and thus shifted Beowulf from the irrelevant fringes to the very centre of the Anglo-Saxon thought world. This naturally encouraged a pre-existent tendency to square the poem with what else was known of the 'serious' levels of Anglo-Saxon thought – chiefly the Latin scholarship of the Church. Secondly, Tolkien went far towards vindicating the structure of the poem by arguing that it was a balance of contrasting and interlocking halves. His thesis not only convinced many critics but inspired them to follow his example, with the result that Tolkien's own position has been outflanked. Whereas previous generations of scholars, Tolkien included, had been quite prepared to explain what they considered structural and stylistic blemishes as interpolations, modern writers seek evidence of artistic refinement in some of the poem's least promising features.

Michael D. C. Drout similarly describes the essay's importance and arguments, writing that it

is the most important article ever written about Beowulf ... Tolkien's shadow looms long over Beowulf scholarship. Much of this influence is because of the enormous success of [the essay], which is viewed as the beginning of modern Beowulf criticism. ... Tolkien was so influential ... because he developed a big-picture reading of the poem that has found favour with several generations of critics. ... [He] made the first widely accepted case for viewing Beowulf as aesthetically successful, and he showed how the monsters in Beowulf were symbolic (not allegorical) representations of chaos and night, set in opposition to stability and civilization. ... Thus, Tolkien interpreted the theme of Beowulf to be that "man, each man and all men and all their works shall die," a theme consistent with the heathen past but one that "no Christian need despise." It was this theme, Tolkien argued, that brought the great dignity to the poem that even scholars who had regretted the monsters had noted.

Drout then remarks on the paradoxical success of the essay:

The massive influence of "The Homecoming" and "Beowulf: The Monsters and the Critics" is in some ways ironic. The great majority of Tolkien's work on Beowulf was of the sort represented by the textual commentry in Finn and Hengest—detailed, philological, historical, and infinitely painstaking. Yet the most influential of Tolkien's discussions of the poem are those in which he makes the greatest unsupported (or lightly supported) generalizations and in which he discusses the poem in the broadest possible terms. Tolkien would perhaps have seen a fundamental continuity between the detailed and philological and the broader and more interpret[at]ive work, but because of the accidents of publication—and because of Tolkien's great gift for rhetoric—only the latter has shaped the field of Beowulf criticism.

John D. Niles observed that "Bypassing earlier scholarship, critics of the past fifty years have generally traced the current era of Beowulf studies back to 1936", meaning to Tolkien's essay, which he called "eloquent and incisive". Niles argued that the essay quickly came to be a starting point, as scholars from then on assumed—with Tolkien—that the poem was "an aesthetic unity endowed with spiritual significance." In Niles's view, Tolkien thought that the battles with monsters and the sombre, elegiac tone of the poem expressed the "artistic designs of a deep thinker, religiously enlightened, who let his mind play over a lost heroic world of the imagination", in other words that the Beowulf poet was a man much like Tolkien. Niles cited George Clark's observation that Tolkien left Beowulf scholars with the "myth of the poet as brooding intellectual, poised between a dying pagan world and a nascent Christian one." Niles noted that Tolkien's view of the melancholic vision of the Beowulf poet, and of the heroic fatalism of the poem's leading characters, was not wholly new, but that his view of the poet himself as a hero was.

=== Press ===
Joan Acocella, writing in The New Yorker, calls it "a paper that many people regard as not just the finest essay on the poem but one of the finest essays on English literature." She adds that "Tolkien preferred the monsters to the critics."

Regina Weinreich, reviewing The Monsters and the Critics, and Other Essays in The New York Times, wrote that the title essay "revolutionized the study of the early English poem Beowulf, in which a young hero crushes a human-handed monster called Grendel. Against the scorn of critics, Tolkien defends the centrality and seriousness of literary monsters, declaring his own belief in the symbolic value of such preternatural representations of sheer evil." Weinreich added that "Beowulf, like other ancient legends, served to nourish Tolkien's imagination."

John Garth, writing in The Guardian, describes the paper as "still well worth reading, not only as an introduction to the poem, but also because it decisively changed the direction and emphasis of Beowulf scholarship. Up to that point it had been used as a quarry of linguistic, historical and archaeological detail". Garth notes that

Tolkien pushed the monsters to the forefront. He argued that they represent the impermanence of human life, the mortal enemy that can strike at the heart of everything we hold dear, the force against which we need to muster all our strength – even if ultimately we may lose the fight. Without the monsters, the peculiarly northern courage of Beowulf and his men is meaningless. Tolkien, veteran of the Somme, knew that it was not.

=== Translator ===
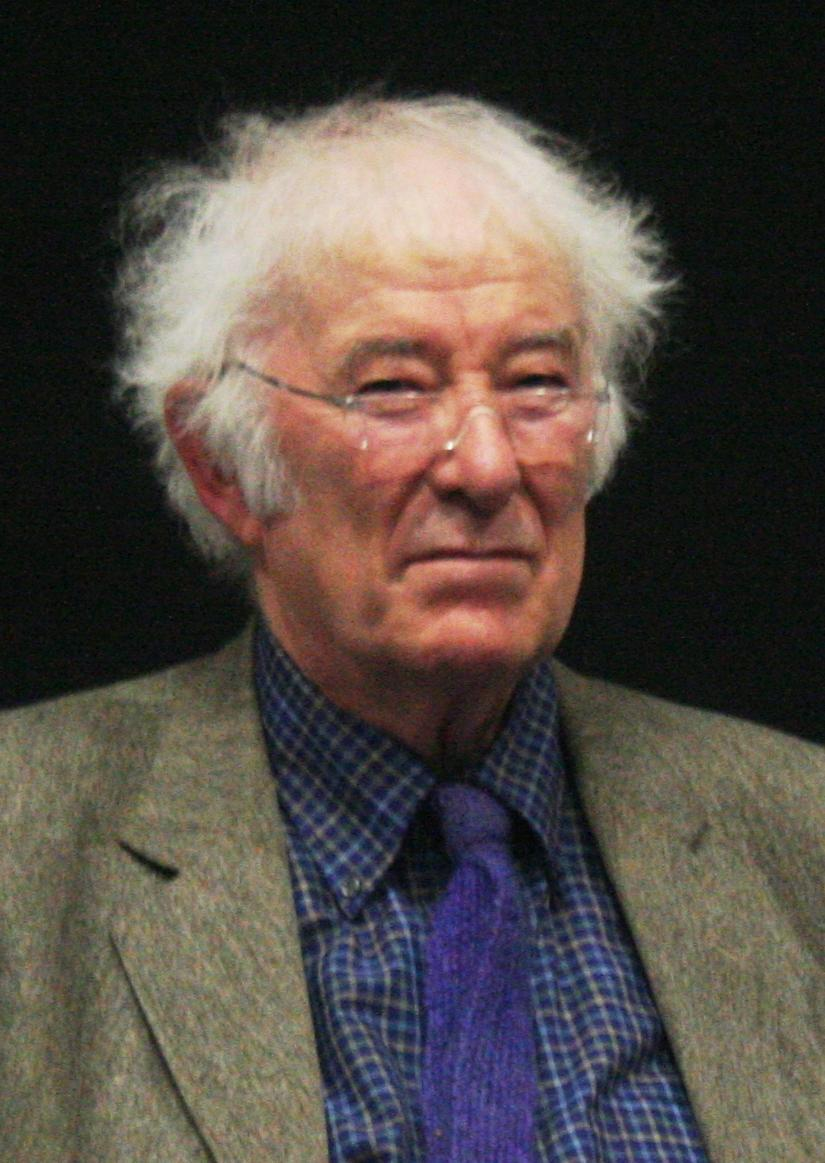
The poet and Beowulf translator Seamus Heaney praised The Monsters and the Critics.

Tolkien's paper was praised by the Irish poet Seamus Heaney in the introduction to his critically acclaimed translation of Beowulf. He wrote that the "epoch-making paper" stood out in considering Beowulf as literature. Heaney argued that Tolkien "took for granted the poem's integrity and distinction as a work of art", and showed how the poem achieved that status:

Tolkien assumed that the poet had felt his way through the inherited material – the fabulous elements and the traditional accounts of a heroic past – and by a combination of creative intuition and conscious structuring had arrived at a unity of effect and a balanced order. He assumed, in other words, that the Beowulf poet was an imaginative writer rather than some kind of back-formation derived from nineteenth-century folklore and philology.

Heaney called the paper's literary treatment "brilliant". He suggested that it had changed the way that Beowulf was valued, and that it had started "a new era of appreciation" of the poem.

=== New light from Tolkien's Beowulf translation ===
Tolkien's own prose translation of Beowulf, published posthumously in 2014 as Beowulf: A Translation and Commentary, has been linked to the essay. Shippey has argued that the translation throws light on "what Tolkien really thought in 1936". Tolkien stated, for instance, that Beowulf was not an actual picture of Scandinavia around 500 AD, but was a self-consistent picture with the marks of design and thought. This might leave the reader wondering, commented Shippey, what exactly Tolkien meant by that. Shippey argued that there was evidence from the chronology given in the 2014 book, supported by the work of scholars such as the archaeologist Martin Rundkvist, that there was serious trouble among the eastern Geats, with migration and the taking over of mead-halls by new leaders, at that time, just as portrayed in the poem.

== Editions ==
- Tolkien, J. R. R. (1936). "Beowulf: The Monsters and the Critics". Proceedings of the British Academy. 22: 245–295.
- Tolkien, J. R. R. (1983). The Monsters and the Critics, and Other Essays. London: George Allen & Unwin. ISBN 0-04-809019-0.
- Tolkien, J. R. R. (1997). The Monsters and the Critics. London: HarperCollins. ISBN 0-261-10263-X.
- Nicholson, Lewis E., ed. (1963). An Anthology of Beowulf Criticism. Notre Dame: University of Notre Dame Press. ISBN 0-268-00006-9.
- Fulk, Robert Dennis, ed. (1991). Interpretations of Beowulf: A Critical Anthology. Indiana University Press. pp. 14–43. ISBN 0-253-20639-1.

== See also ==
- Beowulf: A Translation and Commentary (Tolkien's translation of the poem, with extensive commentary, written before "Beowulf: The Monsters and the Critics", edited by Christopher Tolkien, 2014)
- "On Translating Beowulf" (Tolkien's essay of advice to any translator of the poem)
- Tolkien's monsters

== Sources ==
- Tolkien, J. R. R. (1997) [1983]. The Monsters and the Critics. London: HarperCollins. ISBN 978-0-261-10263-7.
