= Ritchie Girvan =

Scottish literary scholar and author

Ritchie Girvan as a Professor of English Language at the University of Glasgow, probably in 1947

Ritchie Girvan (1877 – c. 1958) was a Scottish literary scholar, author, and academic; throughout his career he was associated with the University of Glasgow, where he made his name studying the Old English poem Beowulf. He is best known for his 1935 book Beowulf and the Seventh Century: Language and Content.

== Life ==
Girvan was born in Campbeltown, Argyllshire, Scotland in 1877; his mother was Mary Girvan of Milknowe Terrace, Campbeltown.

Girvan began his studies at Glasgow in 1894, taking his MA in 1889. He became an English Language lecturer at the university in 1907, remaining there for the rest of his career; he was made professor in 1947. He was awarded an honorary LLD by the university in 1950, and served as Dean of Faculties between 1954 and 1958.

== Beowulf criticism ==
Girvan is best known for his 1935 book Beowulf and the Seventh Century: Language and Content; Reviewing the book for Modern Language Notes in 1938, Elliott Van Kirk Dobbie noted that Girvan dates Beowulf to about 680–700, earlier than generally accepted at that time, and that Girvan generalizes where details of word forms are important. He notes also that the poem cannot be used as a guide to life at the time of the Anglo-Saxon migration to England (c. 550) because of the long period between then and the time of writing. However Girvan accepts "the accuracy of the poet's knowledge regarding Geatish history ... [and] the historicity of Beowulf as king of the Geats." Dobbie writes that "some of this may seem very far-fetched, ... but his book, as an honest and unprejudiced attempt to reconcile the inconsistent and often baffling evidence, deserves earnest consideration from every student of the poem."

Girvan's work on Beowulf is mentioned and critiqued in J.R.R. Tolkien's Beowulf: The Monsters and the Critics:

In the final peroration of his notable lecture on Folk-tale and History in Beowulf, given last year [1935], Mr Girvan said:

"Confessedly there is matter for wonder and scope for doubt, but we might be able to answer with complete satisfaction some of the questionings which rise in men's minds over the [Beowulf] poet's presentment of his hero, if we could also answer with certainty the question why he chose just this subject, when to our modern judgment there were at hand so many greater, charged with the splendour and tragedy of humanity, and in all respects worthier of a genius as astonishing as it was rare in Anglo-Saxon England."

There is something irritatingly odd about all this. One even dares to wonder if something has not gone wrong with 'our modern judgement', supposing that it is justly represented. Higher praise than is found in the learned critics, whose scholarship enables them to appreciate these things, could hardly be given to the detail, the tone, the style, and indeed to the total effect of Beowulf. Yet this poetic talent, we are to understand, has all been squandered on an unprofitable theme: as if Milton had recounted the story of Jack and the Beanstalk in noble verse.

== Legacy ==
While a professor at Glasgow, Girvan presented a stained glass window to Hyndland Parish Church, Glasgow. The window depicts the "Old Covenant and New Covenant" of the Bible, though it is often called the "Nativity" window because of its depiction of scenes from Jesus's childhood.

== Selected works ==
- Angelsaksisch Handboek (= Oudgermaansche Handboeken 4) (1931), Haarlem.
- Beowulf and the Seventh Century: Language and Content (1935), Methuen.
- Finnsburuh (1940), Proceedings of the British Academy 26: 327–60.
