= Strong Hans =

German fairy tale

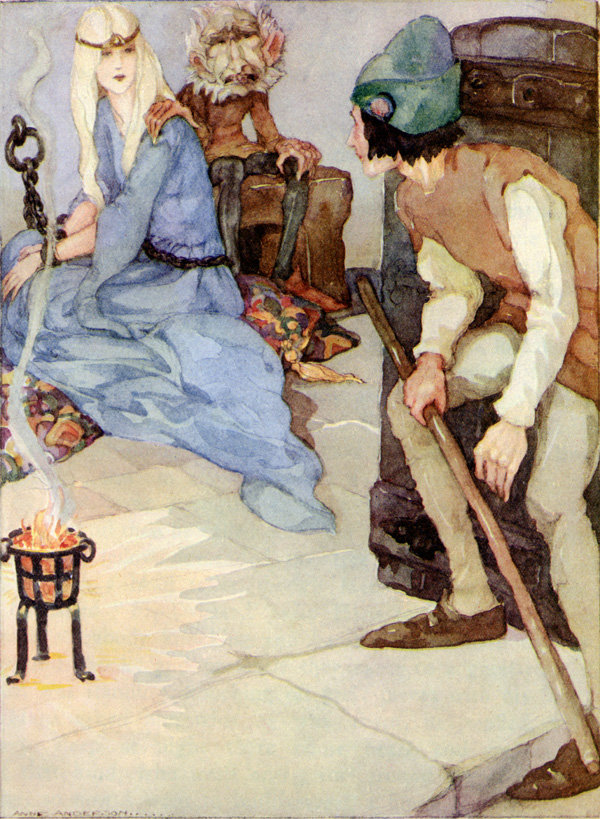
- Strong Hans sights the princess at the mercy of the evil dwarf. Illustration by Anne Anderson.

Folk tale
- Name: Strong Hans
- Aarne–Thompson grouping: ATU 650A (Strong Hans)
- Region: Germany
- Published in: Kinder- und Hausmärchen, by the Brothers Grimm (1856)
- Related: Jean de l'Ours

"Strong Hans" (German: Der starke Hans) is a German fairy tale collected by the Brothers Grimm and published in their collection as number KHM 166.

The tale is classified in the Aarne-Thompson-Uther Index as ATU 650A, "Strong John".

== Summary ==
A two-year-old child named Hans and his mother are kidnapped by thieves and taken to their hideout in a cave, the woman forced to be the thieves' housemaid. When he is nine years old, Hans asks his mother where his father is, but the thieves' leader beats the boy. One year later, Hans asks again, beats the drunken thieves, and returns with his mother to his father, taking the bandits' gold with him.

Years later, now a youth, he walks the earth with his cane and meets two similarly strong individuals: one who can break pines into ropes and another who can break rocks with his fists. The three strike a friendship and agree to hunt together and cook the game at home.

One day, the two companions are defeated by a mysterious being in the woods, who asked for some meat. When Hans meets the creature (a dwarf), the youth gives him a piece of meat and follows it to its lair in the mountain. He calls his companions to help him enter the mountain with a long rope. There, Hans kills the dwarf and releases a king's daughter (a princess). When Hans takes the princess to his companions to pull her to the surface, the two companions cut the rope and the youth is trapped in the dwarf's lair. He soon finds a magic ring and uses it to teleport out of the mountain.

== Analysis ==
The German tale is classified in the Aarne-Thompson-Uther Index as ATU 650A. These types refer to stories where the hero is the fruit of the union between a human and an otherworldly character, often showing superhuman strength as he matures. In other variants, the hero is nursed with milk from his mother or from a female animal and develops the wonderful attributes by which he will be known.

Professor Stith Thompson remarked the great similarities between the ATU 650A, "Strong John", and tale type AT 301B, "John, the Bear" (Jean de l'Ours), since both types show a protagonist with superhuman attributes. In his second expansion of Antti Aarne's folktale classification, he established that type AT 650A served as introduction to type AT 301B, "The Strong Man and his Companions" ("Jean de l'Ours"). In addition, some stories of type 650A feature an episode of type ATU 1000, "Anger Bargain (Bargain not to become angry)".

In some tales, the boy's employer (farmer, blacksmith, etc.) is so afraid of the boy's enormous strength that he sets a series of tasks to get rid of him, even sending the boy to a haunted mill. In these versions, the tale type, ATU 650A, merges with episodes of type ATU 326, "The Story of the Youth Who Went Forth to Learn What Fear Was" - a phenomenon that can already be seen in European variants. This combination also occurs in Andean stories, which create a complex narrative by mixing types AT 301B, ATU 326 and ATU 650A.

It has also been suggested that tale types ATU 301 and its subtype Jean de l'Ours, ATU 650 ("Strong Hans"), ATU 302 ("Devil's Heart in the Egg") and ATU 554 ("The Grateful Animals") may have once comprised a single narrative, but, with time, the original story fragmented into different tale types.

=== Parallels ===
In the 19th century, Austrian consul Johann Georg von Hahn, collector of Balkanic folktales, remarked that "Strong Hans" tales are some of the most common folktales. He also compared the strong hero to Greek god Heracles, Germanic deity Thor and hero Siegfried, due to their heroic feats of defeating a dragon or serpent, as well as being great eaters and drinkers. A similar assessment was given by Heinrich Pröhle in Märchen für die Jugend, when he compared the variant he collected with Germanic Thor: the gluttony recalls his great appetite, and the iron cane reminded him of the powerful Mjollnir hammer.

In the same vein, German philologist Paul Kretschmer saw parallels between Hercules and other counterparts of Strong Hans: Pomeranian starken Jochem; Italian Giovanni Benforte and Zuam (Giovanni) Valent; French Jean de l'Ours and Spanish Juan de l'Os.

Parallels have also been argued between the tale type and similar stories about strong men in Old Norse literature, such as Bárðar saga Snæfellsáss.

Scholarship also points to similarities of the strong hero type with the giant Rainouart from old French chansons de geste. The youth is known for his gluttonous appetite and for his tinel, a huge weapon made of oak.

On the other hand, it has been suggested that the Strong John tale type (ATU 650A) shows signs of an initiation ritual, a hero's journey that echoes mythic narrative: hero's preternatural birth by an animal; the boy's rapid growth and further adventures in his youth; the entrance into the forest; hero's return home as a changed man.

== Distribution ==
According to Stith Thompson, the tale type can be found "in nearly every European country".

More than a thousand variants have been recorded in Europe, specially in Ireland, Germany, Scandinavia and Baltic countries. Outside Europe, the tale type is also recorded in Middle East folktale compilations. Scholar Stith Thompson reported nearly four hundred variants collected "in Estonia and Finland alone".

Professor Jack Haney stated that the tale type is "very common among the Russians and Ukrainians". Further scholarship describes the tale type as very popular in Eastern Europe and present "in the Uralic–Altaian tale corpus".

=== Variants ===
==== Ireland ====
In a variant from Ireland, collected in 1929 from Diarmiud 'Ac Giolla Chearra with the name Ashy Pet, the protagonist is a lazy boy with an enormous appetite who eats the porridge that his mother made for his father and his workmen. Fearing punishment, he flees home and finds work elsewhere. Under this new employer, the youth kills three giants, their mother, and descends into hell to ask the devils for barley seed.

==== England ====
Despite omitting its classification of the story, folklorist Katherine Mary Briggs summarized Joseph Jacobs's account of Tom Hickathrift's adventures to the main points, and they follow very closely the tale type: Tom suckles his mother's milk for twenty years and acquires superhuman strength; his employer is so frightened by him that the sends the boy on errands to keep him busy.

==== France ====
French comparativist Emmanuel Cosquin collected three "pure" versions of the tale, which he named L'Homme Fort ("The Strong Man"). All three stories focus their narrative in the human boy: after he suckles his mother's milk and develops great strength, he travels the world to find a place to make good use of his powers. In one version, the boy's employer sends him on an errand to force the devil to pay his debt and in other to grind flour in "the devil's mill", from where no one has ever returned.

==== Denmark ====
Collector Svend Grundtvig published a Danish variant titled Stærke Hans ("Strong Hans").

==== Norway ====
In a Norwegian tale, Murmel Gänseei ("Murmur Goose-Egg"), a youth of homely aspect is born from an egg, and soon demands to be fed with porridge and milk. He grows up and develops his great strength, to the king's horror, who devises many (failed) plans to get rid of the superpowered youth, often with comical results.

==== Germany ====
The Brothers Grimm collected a second variant of the tale type, titled The Young Giant (Der junge Riese) (de). In this variant, the boy is nursed with "male giant's milk" and develops his great strength.

Ludwig Bechstein collected another German variant, Der starke Gottlieb ("The Strong Gottlieb") (de), where the titular Gottlieb suckles his mother's milk for fourteen years and becomes strong. Later, he employs himself to a local lord and perform tasks for him, even going into a haunted mill.

Ulrich Jahn collected a tale from Pommern, titled Das Wolfskind ("The Wolf's Child"), wherein a young boy named Johann loses his father in the woods and is rescued by a wolf. The animal nurses the boy for twelve years and then he rejoins his human peers by seeking a job with a farmer. After a year, he fulfills his tasks and travels the world with a cane, meeting two other humans like him. The trio arrive at a mountain and send Johann down a pit to rescue three princesses from three evil dragons. He also collected the tale Das Männchen Sonderbar, wherein the hero is born to human parents, but develops great strength. He later is apprenticed to a blacksmith, who forges him an iron cane. Soon enough, the youth descends into a subterranean realm, battles three dragon on bridges, rescues a princess, saves a nest of young eagles and hitches a ride on the mother eagle's back.

Ulrich Jahn also published a "pure" version in his notes: a blacksmith forges a boy out of iron and names it "Îsenkîerl". The boy comes to life and lives with the man. Later, when he is grown up, the youth finds two similarly strong individuals and defeats a witch and her three dragon servants in her underground lair. His companions flee when he returns to the surface, but the youth departs with gold found in the witch's lair and goes back to the blacksmith. Another variant he commented on has the hero forcing a dwarf in the underground realm to help him and an ostrich (Vogel Strauss) being the avian helper who carries the hero to the surface.

==== Poland ====
Ulrich Jahn published a fourth variant in his notes, very similar to the Grimm's tale, but its origin was from a "Kassubischen" (Kashubian?) gypsy storyteller. In this story, the boy's mother is kidnapped by a band of thieves and forced to be their housemaid. By the time the boy is twelve years old, he becomes exceptionally strong, kills the robbers and rescues his human mother.

Ulrich Jahn also published another variant, closely connected to what he called Märchen vom Löwensohn ("Tale of the Lion's Son"), wherein the hero's human mother is kidnapped by "a black man" and taken to the den of thieves. She gives birth to a human son, but the thieves toss him in a lioness's pit to be suckled by the animal along with its cub. It is the lioness's milk that grants the hero his super strength.

==== Hungary ====
Antal Horger published a talle collected from a Csángo source, titled Erős János, wherein a lazy youth of about twenty years old begins to display his great strength in comical episodes: he erects two beams of a house, captures a bear and brings it back to his employer, etc.

Professor Eva Valis collected and published a complex tale whose initial part falls under type ATU 650, Erős Janós ("Strong John"), with an episode of type ATU 326 (spending the night in a haunted house).

==== Russia ====
Russian scholar Alexander Afanasyev collected a Russian variant titled Nodei, the Priest's Grandson.

Similar tales about strong men in Russian tradition, such as Yeruslan Lazarevich and Ilya Muromets, may be classified in the international index as type ATU 650A. However, in the Russian/East Slavic catalogue proper (abbreviated as SUS), Yeruslan is classified as SUS 650B*, and Ilya Muromets as SUS 650C*.

==== Latvia ====
In a Latvian tale, Strongfist, the titular youth is so strong he ploughs the field by himself, letting his master's horse rest and graze peacefully. He ploughs so hard he reaches the king's fields. His Majesty, disturbed at the youth's presence, sends his troops to detain him, but Strongfist slays them all with his might iron stick. The King's daughter, astonished by the youth's feats, agrees to marry him, but after he releases her elder sister and her brother-in-law from the clutches of devils.

==== Greece ====
Austrian consul Johann Georg von Hahn published a variant from Syros, titled Der starke Hans. In this story, the youngest son of a farmer, named Hans, plays his zither to the mountains, asking who is stronger than him. The mountains echo an answer: he may be strong, but the Drakos and his two elder brothers, who kidnapped princesses, are stronger. Learning there is someone stronger than him, he ventures to find these Drakos and test their might. He arrives at three towers without doors: one of lead, the second of copper and the third of steel. He defeats he Drakos, releases two princesses and marries the third one. The king learns of this outrage and sends his army to defeat him, to no avail. A lame old man offers to defeat Hans and bring the princess back. Hans slices the old man, but each body part becomes another human until there is a mass of enemies that subjugate and kill him. Hans's mother notices his death and goes to the steel tower. A friendly shepherd, who was helped by Hans previously, douses his body with the water of life and resurrects him. Hans travels to the old man's hideout; his wife, the princess, asks the villain for his "weakness": it is located outside his body, in a ten-headed serpent.

==== Romania ====
In a tale collected by folklorist Josef Haltrich (de) from the Transylvanian Saxons, with the title Der starke Hans, a man who has three daughters marry a second woman and had a child named Hans. The boy suckled on his mother's breast for seven years, which prompts her husband to wish for her to become a cow. She transforms into a cow and is put in a field to graze. The father gives a bread made of ashes for Hans to eat. His father notices the boy is growing stronger and sends his half-sisters to spy on him. They fail because Hans gives them a sleeping potion. The eldest sister, however, has hidden eyes on her neck, and sees Hans suckling on the cow's udder. Furious, their father threatens to kill the boy and the cow the next day, but they escape to the forest. He suckles his cow-mother for another seven years and is able to uproot a large tree. The usual narrative follows: he meets two strong companions, defeats a dwarf that steals his food, follows him to a pit; climbs down a rope, finds three sisters (princesses), defeats their multiheaded dragon captor and is betrayed by his companions. Wandering about in the underworld, he finds the same dwarf he trapped in the surface, who points him to a large tree. Soon after he climbs up the tree and finds a griffin's nest. When a snake slithers near the nest, poised to attack the nestling, Hans kills the reptile and the griffin mother, in return, takes him back to the surface.

=== Asia ===
A tale from the Kammu people of Southeast Asia, titled Àay Cét Réey, was noted by the collector to be parallel to the tale type "Strong John".

Professor Dean Fansler collected nine variants from the Philippines and based on similarities between them to tabulate a general overview of the narrative. He also noted that the variants he collected were connected to "two well-known European cycles of folk-tales, - 'Strong Hans' and 'John the Bear'".

=== Africa ===
A variant titled Le fils du caméléon ("The Son of the Chameleon"), collected from the Dogon people of Mali, is reported to veer closely to the international tale type ATU 650A.

=== Americas ===
A variant of the tale type, titled Cane, has been collected from the Maliseet. In this version, the protagonist Huza is suckled by his mother for thirty-nine years and he tests his strength by uprooting an elm-tree. Soon, he returns to his father, who commissions a heavy cane and gifts his son. Huza leaves his parents and walks southwards, to defeat the giants and release the princesses. But first, he employs himself to a farmer, asks a blacksmith to mend his cane, and works for another human master who, afraid of his super strength, tries to send him on dangerous errands. Soon after, the usual story follows: he meets two equally strong individuals (Flood and Iron-Mouth), descends down a crater in the mountain, liberates the princesses, is betrayed by his companions and returns to the surface on the back of a Big Eagle. At the end of the tale, Huza forgives his deceptive friends.

== See also ==
- Bear's Son Tale, analysis of tale type ATU 301 and Beowulf
- Tom Hickathrift, legendary English figure
- Hercules, strong hero of Greco-Roman mythology
- Sigurd or Siegfried, legendary Germanic hero
- Miloš Obilić, legendary Serbian hero
