= Beowulf =

Old English epic poem

- Bēowulf
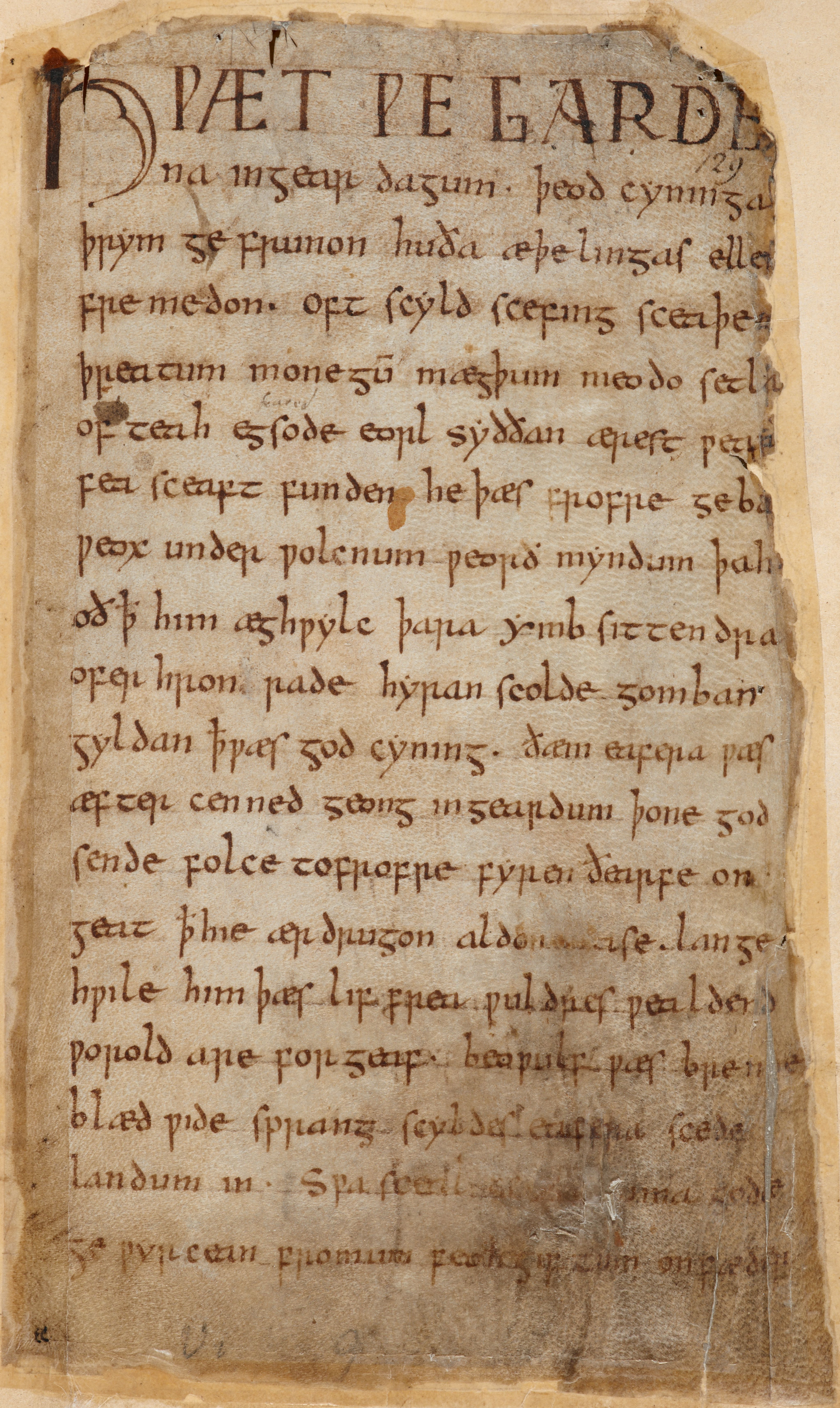
- First page of Beowulf in Cotton Vitellius A. xv. Beginning: HWÆT WE GARDE / na in geardagum, þeodcyninga / þrym gefrunon... (translation: How much we of Spear-Da/nes, in days gone by, of kings / the glory have heard...)
- Author(s): Unknown
- Language: West Saxon dialect of Old English
- Date: Disputed (c. 700–1000 AD)
- State of existence: Manuscript suffered damage from fire in 1731
- Manuscript(s): Cotton Vitellius A. xv (c. 975–1025 AD)
- First printed edition: Thorkelin (1815)
- Genre: Epic heroic writing
- Verse form: Alliterative verse
- Length: c. 3182 lines
- Subject: The battles of Beowulf, the Geatish hero, in youth and old age
- Personages: Beowulf, Hygelac, Hrothgar, Wealhtheow, Hrothulf, Æschere, Unferth, Grendel, Grendel's mother, Wiglaf, Hildeburh. Full list of characters.
- Text: Beowulf at Wikisource

Beowulf (/ˈbeɪ.ə.wʊlf/; Old English: Bēowulf [ˈbeːo.wuɫf]) is an Old English poem, an epic in the tradition of Germanic heroic legend consisting of 3,182 alliterative lines, contained in the Nowell Codex. It is one of the most important and most often translated works of Old English literature. The date of composition is a matter of contention among scholars; the only certain dating is for the manuscript, which was produced between AD 975 and 1025. Scholars call the anonymous author the "Beowulf poet". The story is set in pagan Scandinavia in the 5th and 6th centuries. Beowulf, a hero of the Geats, comes to the aid of Hrothgar, the king of the Danes, whose mead hall Heorot has been under attack by the monster Grendel for twelve years. After Beowulf slays him, Grendel's mother tries to take revenge and is in turn defeated. Victorious, Beowulf goes home to Geatland and becomes king of the Geats. Fifty years later, Beowulf defeats a dragon, but is mortally wounded in the battle. After his death, his attendants cremate his body and erect a barrow on a headland in his memory.

Scholars have debated whether Beowulf was transmitted orally, affecting its interpretation: if it was composed early, in pagan times, then the paganism is central and the Christian elements were added later, whereas if it was composed later, in writing, by a Christian, then the pagan elements could be decorative archaising; some scholars also hold an intermediate position. Beowulf is written mostly in the Late West Saxon dialect of Old English, but many other dialectal forms are present, suggesting that the poem may have had a long and complex transmission throughout the dialect areas of England.

There has long been research into similarities with other traditions and accounts, including the Icelandic Grettis saga, the Norse story of Hrolf Kraki and his bear-shapeshifting servant Bodvar Bjarki, the international folktale the Bear's Son Tale, and the Irish folktale of the Hand and the Child. Persistent attempts have been made to link Beowulf to tales from Homer's Odyssey or Virgil's Aeneid. More definite are biblical parallels, with clear allusions to the books of Genesis, Exodus, and Daniel.

The poem survives in a single copy in the manuscript known as the Nowell Codex. It has no title in the original manuscript, but has become known by the name of the story's protagonist. In 1731, the manuscript was damaged by a fire that swept through Ashburnham House in London, which was housing Sir Robert Cotton's collection of medieval manuscripts. It survived, but the margins were charred, and some readings were lost. The Nowell Codex is housed in the British Library. The poem was first transcribed in 1786; some verses were first translated into modern English in 1805, and nine complete translations were made in the 19th century, including those by John Mitchell Kemble and William Morris. After 1900, hundreds of translations, whether into prose, rhyming verse, or alliterative verse were made, some relatively faithful, some archaising, some attempting to domesticate the work. Among the best-known modern translations are those of Edwin Morgan, Burton Raffel, Michael J. Alexander, Roy Liuzza, and Seamus Heaney. The difficulty of translating Beowulf has been explored by scholars including J. R. R. Tolkien (in his essay "On Translating Beowulf"), who worked on a verse and a prose translation of his own.

== Historical background ==
Tribes mentioned in Beowulf, showing Beowulf's voyage to Heorot and a possible site of the poem's composition in Rendlesham, Suffolk, settled by Angles. See Scandza for details of Scandinavia's political fragmentation in the 6th century.

The events in the poem take place over the 5th and 6th centuries, and feature predominantly non-English characters. Some suggest that Beowulf was first composed in the 7th century at Rendlesham in East Anglia, as the Sutton Hoo ship-burial shows close connections with Scandinavia, and the East Anglian royal dynasty, the Wuffingas, may have been descendants of the Geatish Wulfings. Others have associated this poem with the court of King Alfred the Great or with the court of King Cnut the Great.

The poem blends fictional, legendary, mythic and historical elements. Although the hero Beowulf is not mentioned in any other Old English manuscript, many of the other figures named in Beowulf appear in Scandinavian sources. This concerns not only individuals (e.g., Healfdene, Hroðgar, Halga, Hroðulf, Eadgils, and Ohthere), but also clans (e.g., Scyldings, Scylfings, and Wulfings) and certain events (e.g., the battle between Eadgils and Onela). The raid by King Hygelac into Frisia is mentioned by the 6th century Gallo-Roman historian Gregory of Tours in his History of the Franks and can be dated to around 521.

The majority view appears to be that figures such as King Hrothgar and the Scyldings in Beowulf are based on historical people from 6th-century Scandinavia. Like the Finnesburg Fragment and several shorter surviving poems, Beowulf has consequently been used as a source of information about Scandinavian figures such as Eadgils and Hygelac, and about continental Germanic figures such as Offa, king of the continental Angles. However, one scholar, Roy Liuzza, feels that the poem is "frustratingly ambivalent", neither myth nor folktale, but is set "against a complex background of legendary history ... on a roughly recognizable map of Scandinavia", and comments that the Geats of the poem may correspond with the Gautar (of modern Götaland).

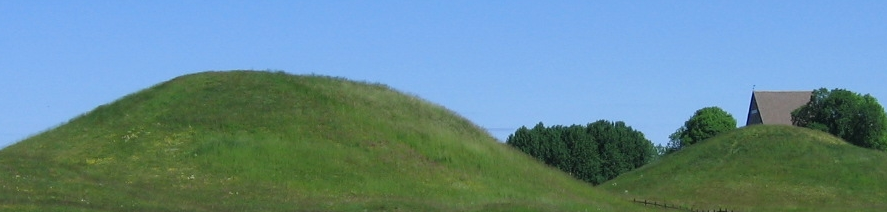
Finds from Gamla Uppsala's western mound, left, excavated in 1874, support Beowulf and the sagas.

Nineteenth-century archaeological evidence may confirm elements of the Beowulf story. Eadgils was buried at Uppsala (Gamla Uppsala, Sweden) according to Snorri Sturluson. When the western mound (to the left in the photo) was excavated in 1874, the finds showed that a powerful man was buried in a large barrow, c. 575, on a bear skin with two dogs and rich grave offerings. The eastern mound was excavated in 1854, and contained the remains of a woman, or a woman and a young man. The middle barrow has not been excavated.

In Denmark, recent (1986–88, 2004–05) archaeological excavations at Lejre, where Scandinavian tradition located the seat of the Scyldings, Heorot, have revealed that a hall was built in the mid-6th century, matching the period described in Beowulf, some centuries before the poem was composed. Three halls, each about 50 metres (160 ft) long, were found during the excavation.

== Summary ==
Carrigan's model of Beowulf's design Key: (a) sections 1–2 (b) 3–7 (c) 8–12 (d) 13–18 (e) 19–23 (f) 24–26 (g) 27–31 (h) 32–33 (i) 34–38 (j) 39–43

The protagonist Beowulf, a hero of the Geats, comes to the aid of Hrothgar, king of the Danes, whose great hall, Heorot, is plagued by the monster Grendel. Beowulf kills Grendel with his bare hands, then kills Grendel's mother with a giant's sword that he found in her lair.

Later in his life, Beowulf becomes king of the Geats, and finds his realm terrorised by a dragon, some of whose treasure had been stolen from his hoard in a burial mound. He attacks the dragon with the help of his thegns or servants, but they do not succeed. Beowulf decides to follow the dragon to its lair at Earnanæs, but only his young Swedish relative Wiglaf, whose name means "remnant of valour", (Note: "wíg" means "fight, battle, war, conflict" and "láf" means "remnant, left-over") dares to join him. Beowulf finally slays the dragon, but is mortally wounded in the struggle. He is cremated and a burial mound by the sea is erected in his honour.

Beowulf is considered an epic poem in that the main character is a hero who travels great distances to prove his strength at impossible odds against supernatural demons and beasts. The poem begins in medias res or simply, "in the middle of things", a characteristic of the epics of antiquity. Although the poem begins with Beowulf's arrival, Grendel's attacks have been ongoing. An elaborate history of characters and their lineages is spoken of, as well as their interactions with each other, debts owed and repaid, and deeds of valour. The warriors form a brotherhood linked by loyalty to their lord. The poem begins and ends with funerals: at the beginning of the poem for Scyld Scefing and at the end for Beowulf.

The poem is tightly structured. E. Carrigan shows the symmetry of its design in a model of its major components, with for instance the account of the killing of Grendel matching that of the killing of the dragon, the glory of the Danes matching the accounts of the Danish and Geatish courts. Other analyses are possible as well; Gale Owen-Crocker, for instance, sees the poem as structured by the four funerals it describes. For J. R. R. Tolkien, the primary division in the poem was between young and old Beowulf.

=== First battle: Grendel ===
Beowulf begins with the story of Hrothgar, who constructed the great hall, Heorot, for himself and his warriors. In it, he, his wife Wealhtheow, and his warriors spend their time singing and celebrating. Grendel, a monstrous troll-like eoten said to be descended from the biblical Cain, is pained by the sounds of joy. Grendel attacks the hall and devours many of Hrothgar's warriors while they sleep. Hrothgar and his people, helpless against Grendel, abandon Heorot.

Beowulf, a young warrior from Geatland, hears of Hrothgar's troubles and with his king's permission leaves his homeland to assist Hrothgar.

Beowulf and his men spend the night in Heorot. Beowulf refuses to use any weapon because he holds himself to be Grendel's equal. When Grendel enters the hall and kills one of Beowulf's men, Beowulf, who has been feigning sleep, leaps up to clench Grendel's hand. Grendel and Beowulf battle each other violently. Beowulf's retainers draw their swords and rush to his aid, but their blades cannot pierce Grendel's skin. Finally, Beowulf tears Grendel's arm from his body at the shoulder. Fatally hurt, Grendel flees to his home in the marshes, where he dies. Beowulf displays "the whole of Grendel's shoulder and arm, his awesome grasp" for all to see at Heorot. This display fuelled Grendel's mother's anger in revenge.

=== Second battle: Grendel's mother ===
The next night, after celebrating Grendel's defeat, Hrothgar and his men sleep in Heorot. Grendel's mother, angry that her son has been killed, sets out to get revenge. "Beowulf was elsewhere. Earlier, after the award of treasure, The Geat had been given another lodging"; his assistance would be absent in this attack. Grendel's mother violently kills Æschere, who is Hrothgar's most loyal advisor, and escapes, later putting his head outside her lair.

Hrothgar, Beowulf, and their men track Grendel's mother to her lair under a lake. Unferth, a warrior who had earlier challenged him, presents Beowulf with his sword Hrunting. After stipulating a number of conditions to Hrothgar in case of his death (including the taking in of his kinsmen and the inheritance by Unferth of Beowulf's estate), Beowulf jumps into the lake and, while harassed by water monsters, gets to the bottom, where he finds a cavern. Grendel's mother pulls him in, and she and Beowulf engage in fierce combat.

At first, Grendel's mother prevails, and Hrunting proves incapable of hurting her; she throws Beowulf to the ground and, sitting astride him, tries to kill him with a short sword, but Beowulf is saved by his armour. Beowulf spots another sword, hanging on the wall and apparently made for giants, and cuts her head off with it. Travelling further into Grendel's mother's lair, Beowulf discovers Grendel's corpse and severs his head with the sword. Its blade melts because of the monster's "hot blood", leaving only the hilt. Beowulf swims back up to the edge of the lake where his men wait. Carrying the hilt of the sword and Grendel's head, he presents them to Hrothgar upon his return to Heorot. Hrothgar gives Beowulf many gifts, including the sword Nægling, his family's heirloom. The events prompt a long reflection by the king, sometimes referred to as "Hrothgar's sermon", in which he urges Beowulf to be wary of pride and to reward his thegns.

=== Final battle: The dragon ===
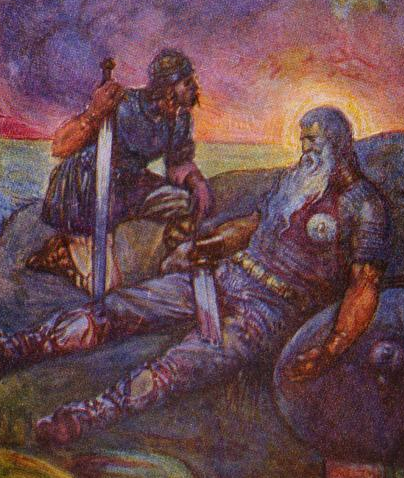
Wiglaf is the single warrior to return and witness Beowulf's death. Illustration by J. R. Skelton, 1908

Beowulf returns home and eventually becomes king of his own people. One day, fifty years after Beowulf's battle with Grendel's mother, a slave steals a golden cup from the lair of a dragon at Earnanæs. When the dragon sees that the cup has been stolen, it leaves its cave in a rage, burning everything in sight. Beowulf and his warriors come to fight the dragon, but Beowulf tells his men that he will fight the dragon alone and that they should wait on the barrow. Beowulf descends to do battle with the dragon, but finds himself outmatched. His men, upon seeing this and fearing for their lives, retreat into the woods. However, one of his men, Wiglaf, in great distress at Beowulf's plight, comes to his aid. The two slay the dragon, but Beowulf is mortally wounded. After Beowulf dies, Wiglaf remains by his side, grief-stricken. When the rest of the men finally return, Wiglaf bitterly admonishes them, blaming their cowardice for Beowulf's death. Beowulf is ritually burned on a great pyre in Geatland while his people wail and mourn him, fearing that without him, the Geats are defenceless against attacks from surrounding tribes. Afterwards, a barrow, visible from the sea, is built in his memory.

=== Digressions ===
The poem contains many apparent digressions from the main story. These were found troublesome by early Beowulf scholars such as Frederick Klaeber, who wrote that they "interrupt the story", W. W. Lawrence, who stated that they "clog the action and distract attention from it", and W. P. Ker who stated that some are "irrelevant, and may possibly be interpolations". More recent scholars from Adrien Bonjour onwards note that the digressions can all be explained as introductions or comparisons with elements of the main story; for instance, Beowulf's swimming home across the sea from Frisia carrying thirty sets of armour emphasises his heroic strength. The digressions can be divided into four groups, namely the Scyld narrative at the start; many descriptions of the Geats, including the Swedish–Geatish wars, the "Lay of the Last Survivor" in the style of another Old English poem, "The Wanderer", and Beowulf's dealings with the Geats such as his verbal contest with Unferth and his swimming duel with Breca, and the tale of Sigemund and the dragon; history and legend, including the fight at Finnsburg and the tale of Freawaru and Ingeld; and biblical tales such as the creation myth and Cain as ancestor of all monsters. The digressions provide a powerful impression of historical depth, imitated by Tolkien in The Lord of the Rings, a work that embodies many other elements from the poem.

== Authorship and date ==
The dating of Beowulf has attracted considerable scholarly attention; opinion differs as to whether it was first written in the 8th century, whether it was nearly contemporary with its 11th-century manuscript, and whether a proto-version (possibly a version of the "Bear's Son Tale") was orally transmitted before being transcribed in its present form. Albert Lord felt strongly that the manuscript represents the transcription of a performance, though likely taken at more than one sitting. J. R. R. Tolkien believed that the poem retains too genuine a memory of Anglo-Saxon paganism to have been composed more than a few generations after the completion of the Christianisation of England around AD 700, and Tolkien's conviction that the poem dates to the 8th century has been defended by scholars including Tom Shippey, Leonard Neidorf, Rafael J. Pascual, and Robert D. Fulk. An analysis of several Old English poems by a team including Neidorf suggests that Beowulf is the work of a single author, though other scholars disagree.

The claim to an early 11th-century date depends in part on scholars who argue that, rather than the transcription of a tale from the oral tradition by an earlier literate monk, Beowulf reflects an original interpretation of an earlier version of the story by the manuscript's two scribes. On the other hand, some scholars argue that linguistic, palaeographical (handwriting), metrical (poetic structure), and onomastic (naming) considerations align to support a date of composition in the first half of the 8th century; in particular, the poem's apparent observation of etymological vowel-length distinctions in unstressed syllables (described by Kaluza's law) has been thought to demonstrate a date of composition prior to the earlier ninth century. However, scholars disagree about whether the metrical phenomena described by Kaluza's law prove an early date of composition or are evidence of a longer prehistory of the Beowulf metre; B. R. Hutcheson, for instance, does not believe Kaluza's law can be used to date the poem, while nonetheless claiming that "the weight of all the evidence Fulk presents in his book (Note: That is, R. D. Fulk's 1992 A History of Old English Meter.) tells strongly in favour of an eighth-century date."

From an analysis of creative genealogy and ethnicity, Craig R. Davis suggests a composition date in the AD 890s, when King Alfred of England had secured the submission of Guthrum, leader of a division of the Great Heathen Army of the Danes, and of Aethelred, ealdorman of Mercia. In this thesis, the trend of appropriating Gothic royal ancestry, established in Francia during Charlemagne's reign, influenced the Anglian kingdoms of Britain to attribute to themselves a Geatish descent. The composition of Beowulf was the fruit of the later adaptation of this trend in Alfred's policy of asserting authority over the Angelcynn, in which Scyldic descent was attributed to the West-Saxon royal pedigree. This date of composition largely agrees with Lapidge's positing of a West-Saxon exemplar c. 900.

The location of the poem's composition is intensely disputed. In 1914, F.W. Moorman, the first professor of English Language at University of Leeds, claimed that Beowulf was composed in Yorkshire, but E. Talbot Donaldson claims that it was probably composed during the first half of the eighth century, and that the writer was a native of what was then called West Mercia, located in the Western Midlands of England. However, the late tenth-century manuscript, "which alone preserves the poem", originated in the kingdom of the West Saxons — as it is more commonly known.

== Manuscript ==
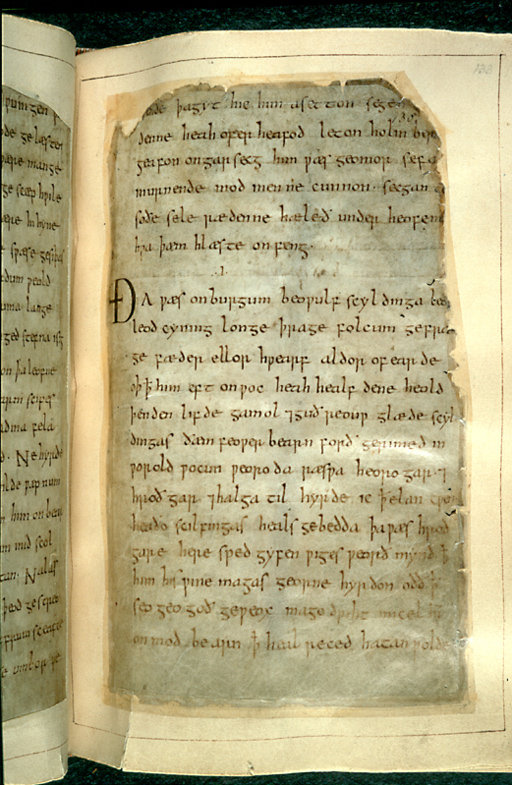
Remounted page, British Library Cotton Vitellius A.XV

Beowulf survived to modern times in a single manuscript, written in ink on parchment, later damaged by fire. The manuscript measures 245 mm × 185 mm (9.6 in × 7.3 in).

=== Provenance ===
The poem is known only from a single manuscript, estimated to date from around 975–1025, in which it appears with other works. The manuscript therefore dates either to the reign of Æthelred the Unready, characterised by strife with the Danish king Sweyn Forkbeard, or to the beginning of the reign of Sweyn's son Cnut the Great from 1016. The Beowulf manuscript is known as the Nowell Codex, gaining its name from 16th-century scholar Laurence Nowell. The official designation is "British Library, Cotton Vitellius A.XV" because it was one of Sir Robert Bruce Cotton's holdings in the Cotton library in the middle of the 17th century. Many private antiquarians and book collectors, such as Sir Robert Cotton, used their own library classification systems. "Cotton Vitellius A.XV" translates as: the 15th book from the left on shelf A (the top shelf) of the bookcase with the bust of Roman Emperor Vitellius standing on top of it, in Cotton's collection. Kevin Kiernan argues that Nowell most likely acquired it through William Cecil, 1st Baron Burghley, in 1563, when Nowell entered Cecil's household as a tutor to his ward, Edward de Vere, 17th Earl of Oxford.

The earliest extant reference to the first foliation of the Nowell Codex was made sometime between 1628 and 1650 by Franciscus Junius (the younger). The ownership of the codex before Nowell remains a mystery.

The Reverend Thomas Smith (1638–1710) and Humfrey Wanley (1672–1726) both catalogued the Cotton library (in which the Nowell Codex was held). Smith's catalogue appeared in 1696, and Wanley's in 1705. The Beowulf manuscript is identified by name for the first time in an exchange of letters in 1700 between George Hickes, Wanley's assistant, and Wanley. In the letter to Wanley, Hickes responds to an apparent charge against Smith, made by Wanley, that Smith had failed to mention the Beowulf script when cataloguing Cotton MS. Vitellius A. XV. Hickes replies to Wanley "I can find nothing yet of Beowulph." Kiernan theorised that Smith failed to mention the Beowulf manuscript because of his reliance on previous catalogues or because either he had no idea how to describe it or because it was temporarily out of the codex.

The manuscript passed to Crown ownership in 1702, on the death of its then owner, Sir John Cotton, who had inherited it from his grandfather, Robert Cotton. It suffered damage in a fire at Ashburnham House in 1731, in which around a quarter of the manuscripts bequeathed by Cotton were destroyed. Since then, parts of the manuscript have crumbled along with many of the letters. Rebinding efforts, though saving the manuscript from much degeneration, have nonetheless covered up other letters of the poem, causing further loss. Kiernan, in preparing his electronic edition of the manuscript, used fibre-optic backlighting and ultraviolet lighting to reveal letters in the manuscript lost from binding, erasure, or ink blotting.

=== Writing ===
The Beowulf manuscript was transcribed from an original by two scribes, one of whom wrote the prose at the beginning of the manuscript and the first 1939 lines, before breaking off in mid-sentence. The first scribe made a point of carefully regularizing the spelling of the original document into the common West Saxon, removing any archaic or dialectical features. The second scribe, who wrote the remainder, with a difference in handwriting noticeable after line 1939, seems to have written more vigorously and with less interest. As a result, the second scribe's script retains more archaic dialectic features, which allow modern scholars to ascribe the poem a cultural context. While both scribes appear to have proofread their work, there are nevertheless many errors. The second scribe was ultimately the more conservative copyist as he did not modify the spelling of the text as he wrote, but copied what he saw in front of him. In the way that it is currently bound, the Beowulf manuscript is followed by the Old English poem Judith. Judith was written by the same scribe that completed Beowulf, as evidenced by similar writing style. Wormholes found in the last leaves of the Beowulf manuscript that are absent in the Judith manuscript suggest that at one point Beowulf ended the volume. The rubbed appearance of some leaves suggests that the manuscript stood on a shelf unbound, as was the case with other Old English manuscripts. Knowledge of books held in the library at Malmesbury Abbey and available as source works, as well as the identification of certain words particular to the local dialect found in the text, suggest that the transcription may have taken place there.

=== Performance ===
The traditional view is that Beowulf was composed for performance, chanted by a scop (left) to string accompaniment, but modern scholars have suggested its origin as a piece of written literature borrowed from oral traditions. Illustration by J. R. Skelton, c. 1910

The scholar Roy Liuzza notes that the practice of oral poetry is by its nature invisible to history as evidence is in writing. Comparison with other bodies of verse such as Homer's, coupled with ethnographic observation of early 20th century performers, has provided a vision of how an Anglo-Saxon singer-poet or scop may have practised. The resulting model is that performance was based on traditional stories and a repertoire of word formulae that fitted the traditional metre. The scop moved through the scenes, such as putting on armour or crossing the sea, each one improvised at each telling with differing combinations of the stock phrases, while the basic story and style remained the same. Liuzza notes that the poem specifically describes the technique of a court poet in assembling materials, in lines 867–874 in his translation, "full of grand stories, mindful of songs ... found other words truly bound together; ... to recite with skill the adventure of Beowulf, adeptly tell a tall tale, and (wordum wrixlan) weave his words." The poem further mentions (lines 1065–1068) that "the harp was touched, tales often told, when Hrothgar's scop was set to recite among the mead tables his hall-entertainment".

=== Debate over oral tradition ===
The question of whether Beowulf was passed down through oral tradition prior to its present manuscript form has been the subject of much debate, and involves more than simply the issue of its composition. Rather, given the implications of the theory of oral-formulaic composition and oral tradition, the question concerns how the poem is to be understood, and what sorts of interpretations are legitimate. In his landmark 1960 work, The Singer of Tales, Albert Lord, citing the work of Francis Peabody Magoun and others, considered it proven that Beowulf was composed orally. Later scholars have not all been convinced; they agree that "themes" like "arming the hero" or the "hero on the beach" do exist across Germanic works. Some scholars conclude that Anglo-Saxon poetry is a mix of oral-formulaic and literate patterns. Larry Benson proposed that Germanic literature contains "kernels of tradition" which Beowulf expands upon. Ann Watts argued against the imperfect application of one theory to two different traditions: traditional, Homeric, oral-formulaic poetry and Anglo-Saxon poetry. Thomas Gardner agreed with Watts, arguing that the Beowulf text is too varied to be completely constructed from set formulae and themes. John Miles Foley wrote that comparative work must observe the particularities of a given tradition; in his view, there was a fluid continuum from traditionality to textuality.

== Editions, translations, and adaptations ==
=== Editions ===
Many editions of the Old English text of Beowulf have been published; this section lists the most influential.

The Icelandic scholar Grímur Jónsson Thorkelin made the first transcriptions of the Beowulf-manuscript in 1786, working as part of a Danish government historical research commission. He had a copy made by a professional copyist who knew no Old English (and was therefore in some ways more likely to make transcription errors, but in other ways more likely to copy exactly what he saw), and then made a copy. Since that time, the manuscript has crumbled further, making these transcripts prized witnesses to the text. While the recovery of at least 2000 letters can be attributed to them, their accuracy has been called into question, (Note: For instance, by Chauncey Brewster Tinker in The Translations of Beowulf, a comprehensive survey of 19th-century translations and editions of Beowulf.) and the extent to which the manuscript was actually more readable in Thorkelin's time is uncertain. Thorkelin used these transcriptions as the basis for the first complete edition of Beowulf, in Latin.

In 1922, Frederick Klaeber, a German philologist who worked at the University of Minnesota, published his edition of the poem, Beowulf and The Fight at Finnsburg; it became the "central source used by graduate students for the study of the poem and by scholars and teachers as the basis of their translations." The edition included an extensive glossary of Old English terms. His third edition was published in 1936, with the last version in his lifetime being a revised reprint in 1950. Klaeber's text was re-presented with new introductory material, notes, and glosses, in a fourth edition in 2008.

Another widely used edition is Elliott Van Kirk Dobbie's, published in 1953 in the Anglo-Saxon Poetic Records series. The British Library, meanwhile, took a prominent role in supporting Kevin Kiernan's Electronic Beowulf; the first edition appeared in 1999, and the fourth in 2014.

=== Translations and adaptations ===
The tightly interwoven structure of Old English poetry makes translating Beowulf a severe technical challenge. Despite this, a great number of translations and adaptations are available, in poetry and prose. Andy Orchard, in A Critical Companion to Beowulf, lists 33 "representative" translations in his bibliography, while the Arizona Center for Medieval and Renaissance Studies published Marijane Osborn's annotated list of over 300 translations and adaptations in 2003. Beowulf has been translated many times in verse and in prose, and adapted for stage and screen. By 2020, the Beowulf's Afterlives Bibliographic Database listed some 688 translations and other versions of the poem. Beowulf has been translated into at least 38 other languages.

In 1805, the historian Sharon Turner translated selected verses into modern English. This was followed in 1814 by John Josias Conybeare who published an edition "in English paraphrase and Latin verse translation." N. F. S. Grundtvig reviewed Thorkelin's edition in 1815 and created the first complete verse translation in Danish in 1820. In 1826, John Josias Conybeare translated portions into blank verse. In 1837, John Mitchell Kemble created a literal translation in English. In 1838, Henry Wadsworth Longfellow published a translation of a passage in English. In 1895, William Morris and A. J. Wyatt published the ninth complete English translation.

In 1909, Francis Barton Gummere's full translation in "English imitative metre" was published, and was used as the text of Gareth Hinds's 2007 graphic novel based on Beowulf. In 1975, John Porter published the first complete verse translation of the poem entirely accompanied by facing-page Old English. Seamus Heaney's 1999 translation of the poem (Beowulf: A New Verse Translation, called "Heaneywulf" by the Beowulf translator Howell Chickering and many others) was both praised and criticised. The US publication was commissioned by W. W. Norton & Company, and was included in the Norton Anthology of English Literature. Many retellings of Beowulf for children appeared in the 20th century.

In 2000 (2nd edition 2013), Liuzza published his own version of Beowulf in a parallel text with the Old English, with his analysis of the poem's historical, oral, religious and linguistic contexts. R. D. Fulk, of Indiana University, published a facing-page edition and translation of the entire Nowell Codex manuscript in 2010. Hugh Magennis's 2011 Translating Beowulf: Modern Versions in English Verse discusses the challenges and history of translating the poem, as well as the question of how to approach its poetry, and discusses several post-1950 verse translations, paying special attention to those of Edwin Morgan, Burton Raffel, Michael J. Alexander, and Seamus Heaney. Translating Beowulf is one of the subjects of the 2012 publication Beowulf at Kalamazoo, containing a section with 10 essays on translation, and a section with 22 reviews of Heaney's translation, some of which compare Heaney's work with Liuzza's. Tolkien's long-awaited prose translation (edited by his son Christopher) was published in 2014 as Beowulf: A Translation and Commentary. The book includes Tolkien's own retelling of the story of Beowulf in his tale Sellic Spell, but not his incomplete and unpublished verse translation. The Mere Wife, by Maria Dahvana Headley, was published in 2018. It relocates the action to a wealthy community in 20th-century America and is told primarily from the point of view of Grendel's mother. In 2020, Headley published a translation in which the opening "Hwæt!" is rendered "Bro!"; this translation subsequently won the Hugo Award for Best Related Work.

== Sources and analogues ==
Neither identified sources nor analogues for Beowulf can be definitively proven, but many conjectures have been made. These are important in helping historians understand the Beowulf manuscript, as possible source-texts or influences would suggest time-frames of composition, geographic boundaries within which it could be composed, or range (both spatial and temporal) of influence (i.e. when it was "popular" and where its "popularity" took it). The poem has been related to Scandinavian, Celtic, and international folkloric sources. (Note: Ecclesiastical or biblical influences are only seen as adding "Christian color", in Andersson's survey. Old English sources hinges on the hypothesis that Genesis A predates Beowulf.)

=== Scandinavian parallels and sources ===
19th-century studies proposed that Beowulf was translated from a lost original Scandinavian work; surviving Scandinavian works have continued to be studied as possible sources. In 1886 Gregor Sarrazin suggested that an Old Norse original version of Beowulf must have existed, but in 1914 Carl Wilhelm von Sydow claimed that Beowulf is fundamentally Christian and was written at a time when any Norse tale would have most likely been pagan. Another proposal was a parallel with the Grettis Saga, but in 1998, Magnús Fjalldal challenged that, stating that tangential similarities were being overemphasised as analogies. The story of Hrolf Kraki and his servant, the legendary bear-shapeshifter Bodvar Bjarki, has also been suggested as a possible parallel; he survives in Hrólfs saga kraka and Saxo's Gesta Danorum, while Hrolf Kraki, one of the Scyldings, appears as "Hrothulf" in Beowulf. New Scandinavian analogues to Beowulf continue to be proposed regularly, with Hrólfs saga Gautrekssonar being the most recently adduced text.

=== International folktale sources ===
Friedrich Panzer (1910) wrote a thesis that the first part of Beowulf (the Grendel Story) incorporated preexisting folktale material, and that the folktale in question was of the Bear's Son Tale (Bärensohnmärchen) type, which has surviving examples all over the world. This tale type was later catalogued as international folktale type 301 in the ATU Index, now formally entitled "The Three Stolen Princesses" type in Hans Uther's catalogue, although the "Bear's Son" is still used in Beowulf criticism, if not so much in folkloristic circles. However, although this folkloristic approach was seen as a step in the right direction, "The Bear's Son" tale has later been regarded by many as not a close enough parallel to be a viable choice. Later, Peter A. Jorgensen, looking for a more concise frame of reference, coined a "two-troll tradition" that covers both Beowulf and Grettis saga: "a Norse 'ecotype' in which a hero enters a cave and kills two giants, usually of different sexes"; this has emerged as a more attractive folk tale parallel, according to a 1998 assessment by Andersson.

The epic's similarity to the Irish folktale "The Hand and the Child" was noted in 1899 by Albert S. Cook, and others even earlier. (Note: Ludwig Laistner (1889), II, p. 25; Stopford Brooke, I, p. 120; Albert S. Cook (1899) pp. 154–156.) (Note: In the interim, Max Deutschbein (1909) is credited by Andersson as the first person to present the Irish argument in academic form. He suggested the Irish Feast of Bricriu (not a folktale) as a source for Beowulf—a theory soon denied by Oscar Olson.) In 1914, the Swedish folklorist Carl Wilhelm von Sydow made a strong argument for parallelism with "The Hand and the Child", because the folktale type demonstrated a "monstrous arm" motif that corresponded with Beowulf's wrenching off Grendel's arm. No such correspondence could be perceived in the Bear's Son Tale or in the Grettis saga. (Note: von Sydow was anticipated by Heinz Dehmer in the 1920s, besides the 19th century authors who pointed out "The Hand and the Child" as a parallel.) James Carney and Martin Puhvel agree with this "Hand and the Child" contextualisation. (Note: Carney also sees the Táin Bó Fráech story (where a half-fairy hero fights a dragon in the "Black Pool (Dubh linn)"), but this has received little support.) Puhvel supported the "Hand and the Child" theory through such motifs as (in Andersson's words) "the more powerful giant mother, the mysterious light in the cave, the melting of the sword in blood, the phenomenon of battle rage, swimming prowess, combat with water monsters, underwater adventures, and the bear-hug style of wrestling." In the Mabinogion, Teyrnon discovers the otherworldly boy child Pryderi, the principal character of the cycle, after cutting off the arm of a monstrous beast which is stealing foals from his stables. The medievalist R. Mark Scowcroft notes that the tearing off of the monster's arm without a weapon is found only in Beowulf and fifteen of the Irish variants of the tale; he identifies twelve parallels between the tale and Beowulf.

Scowcroft's "Hand and Child" parallels in Beowulf
"Hand and Child" Irish tale	Grendel	Grendel's Mother
1 Monster is attacking King each night	86 ff	—
2 Hero brings help from afar	194 ff	—
3 At night, when all but hero are asleep	701–705	1251
4 Monster attacks the hall	702 ff	1255 ff
5 Hero pulls off monster's arm	748 ff	—
6 Monster escapes	819 ff	1294 ff
7 Hero tracks monster to its lair	839–849	1402 ff
8 Monster has female companion	1345 ff	—
9 Hero kills the monster	—	1492 ff
10 Hero returns to King	853 ff	1623 ff
11 Hero is rewarded with gifts	1020 ff	1866 ff
12 Hero returns home	—	1888 ff

=== Classical sources ===
Attempts to find classical or Late Latin influence or analogue in Beowulf are almost exclusively linked with Homer's Odyssey or Virgil's Aeneid. In 1926, Albert S. Cook suggested a Homeric connection due to equivalent formulas, metonymies, and analogous voyages. In 1930, James A. Work supported the Homeric influence, stating that the encounter between Beowulf and Unferth was parallel to the encounter between Odysseus and Euryalus in Books 7–8 of the Odyssey, even to the point of both characters giving the hero the same gift of a sword upon being proven wrong in their initial assessment of the hero's prowess. This theory of Homer's influence on Beowulf remained very prevalent in the 1920s, but started to die out in the following decade when a handful of critics stated that the two works were merely "comparative literature", although Greek was known in late 7th century England: Bede states that Theodore of Tarsus, a Greek, was appointed Archbishop of Canterbury in 668, and he taught Greek. Several English scholars and churchmen are described by Bede as being fluent in Greek due to being taught by him; Bede claims to be fluent in Greek.

Frederick Klaeber, among others, argued for a connection between Beowulf and Virgil near the start of the 20th century, claiming that the very act of writing a secular epic in a Germanic world represents Virgilian influence. Virgil was seen as the pinnacle of Latin literature, and Latin was the dominant literary language of England at the time, therefore making Virgilian influence highly likely. Similarly, in 1971, Alistair Campbell stated that the apologue technique used in Beowulf is so rare in epic poetry aside from Virgil that the poet who composed Beowulf could not have written the poem in such a manner without first coming across Virgil's writings.

=== Biblical influences ===
Biblical parallels occur in the text, whether as a pagan work with "Christian colouring" added by scribes or as a "Christian historical novel, with selected bits of paganism deliberately laid on as 'local colour'", as Margaret E. Goldsmith did in "The Christian Theme of Beowulf". Beowulf echoes the Book of Genesis, the Book of Exodus, and the Book of Daniel in its references to the Genesis creation narrative, the story of Cain and Abel, Noah and the flood, the Devil, Hell, and the Last Judgment.

== Dialect ==
Beowulf predominantly uses the West Saxon dialect of Old English, like other Old English poems copied at the time. However, it also uses many other linguistic forms; this leads some scholars to believe that it has endured a long and complicated transmission through all the main dialect areas. It retains a complicated mix of Mercian, Northumbrian, Early West Saxon, Anglian, Kentish and Late West Saxon dialectical forms.

== Form and metre ==
Old English poets typically used alliterative verse, a form of verse in which the first half of the line (the a-verse) is linked to the second half (the b-verse) through similarity in initial sound. That the line consists of two halves is clearly indicated by the caesura: Oft Scyld Scefing \\ sceaþena þreatum (l. 4). This verse form maps stressed and unstressed syllables onto abstract entities known as metrical positions. There is no fixed number of beats per line: the first one cited has three (Oft SCYLD SCEF-ING) whereas the second has two (SCEAþena ÞREATum).

The poet had a choice of formulae to assist in fulfilling the alliteration scheme. These were memorised phrases that conveyed a general and commonly-occurring meaning that fitted neatly into a half-line of the chanted poem. Examples are line 8's weox under wolcnum ("waxed under welkin", i.e. "he grew up under the heavens"), line 11's gomban gyldan ("pay tribute"), line 13's geong in geardum ("young in the yards", i.e. "young in the courts"), and line 14's folce to frofre ("as a comfort to his people").

Kennings are a significant technique in Beowulf. They are evocative poetic descriptions of everyday things, often created to fill the alliterative requirements of the metre. For example, a poet might call the sea the "swan's riding"; a king might be called a "ring-giver". The poem contains many kennings, and the device is typical of much of classic poetry in Old English, which is heavily formulaic.

== Interpretation and criticism ==
The history of modern Beowulf criticism is often said to begin with J. R. R. Tolkien, author and Merton Professor of Anglo-Saxon at the University of Oxford, who in his 1936 lecture to the British Academy criticised his contemporaries' excessive interest in its historical implications. He noted in Beowulf: The Monsters and the Critics that as a result the poem's literary value had been largely overlooked, and argued that the poem "is in fact so interesting as poetry, in places poetry so powerful, that this quite overshadows the historical content..." Tolkien argued that the poem is not an epic; that, while no conventional term exactly fits, the nearest would be elegy; and that its focus is the concluding dirge.

=== Paganism and Christianity ===
In historical terms, the poem's characters were Germanic pagans, yet the poem was recorded by Christian Anglo-Saxons who had mostly converted from their native Anglo-Saxon paganism around the 7th century. Beowulf thus depicts a Germanic warrior society, in which the relationship between the lord of the region and those who served under him was of paramount importance.

In terms of the relationship between characters in Beowulf and God, one might recall the substantial amount of paganism that is present throughout the work. Literary critics such as Fred C. Robinson argue that the Beowulf poet tries to send a message to readers during the Anglo-Saxon time period regarding the state of Christianity in their own time. Robinson argues that the intensified religious aspects of the Anglo-Saxon period inherently shape the way in which the poet alludes to paganism as presented in Beowulf. The poet calls on Anglo-Saxon readers to recognize the imperfect aspects of their supposed Christian lifestyles. In other words, the poet is referencing their "Anglo-Saxon Heathenism". In terms of the characters of the epic, Robinson argues that readers are "impressed" by the courageous acts of Beowulf and the speeches of Hrothgar. But one is ultimately left to feel sorry for both men as they are fully detached from supposed "Christian truth". The relationship between the characters of Beowulf, and the overall message of the poet, regarding their relationship with God is debated among readers and literary critics alike.

Richard North argues that the Beowulf poet interpreted "Danish myths in Christian form" (as the poem would have served as a form of entertainment for a Christian audience), and states: "As yet we are no closer to finding out why the first audience of Beowulf liked to hear stories about people routinely classified as damned. This question is pressing, given... that Anglo-Saxons saw the Danes as 'heathens' rather than as foreigners." Donaldson wrote that "the poet who put the materials into their present form was a Christian and ... poem reflects a Christian tradition".

Other scholars disagree as to whether Beowulf is a Christian work set in a Germanic pagan context. The question suggests that the conversion from the Germanic pagan beliefs to Christian ones was a prolonged and gradual process over several centuries, and the poem's message in respect to religious belief at the time it was written remains unclear. Robert F. Yeager describes the basis for these questions:

That the scribes of Cotton Vitellius A.XV were Christian [is] beyond doubt, and it is equally sure that Beowulf was composed in a Christianised England since conversion took place in the sixth and seventh centuries. The only Biblical references in Beowulf are to the Old Testament, and Christ is never mentioned. The poem is set in pagan times, and none of the characters is demonstrably Christian. In fact, when we are told what anyone in the poem believes, we learn that they are pagans. Beowulf's own beliefs are not expressed explicitly. He offers eloquent prayers to a higher power, addressing himself to the "Father Almighty" or the "Wielder of All". Were those the prayers of a pagan who used phrases the Christians subsequently appropriated? Or did the poem's author intend to see Beowulf as a Christian Ur-hero, symbolically refulgent with Christian virtues?

Ursula Schaefer's view is that the poem was created, and is interpretable, within both pagan and Christian horizons. Schaefer's concept of "vocality" offers neither a compromise nor a synthesis of views that see the poem as on the one hand Germanic, pagan, and oral and on the other Latin-derived, Christian, and literate, but, as stated by Monika Otter: "a 'tertium quid', a modality that participates in both oral and literate culture yet also has a logic and aesthetic of its own."

=== Politics and warfare ===
Stanley B. Greenfield has suggested that references to the human body throughout Beowulf emphasise the relative position of thanes to their lord. He argues that the term "shoulder-companion" could refer to both a physical arm as well as a thane (Aeschere) who was very valuable to his lord (Hrothgar). With Aeschere's death, Hrothgar turns to Beowulf as his new "arm". Greenfield argues the foot is used for the opposite effect, only appearing four times in the poem. It is used in conjunction with Unferð (a man described by Beowulf as weak, traitorous, and cowardly). Greenfield notes that Unferð is described as "at the king's feet" (line 499). Unferð is a member of the foot troops, who, throughout the story, do nothing and "generally serve as backdrops for more heroic action."

Daniel Podgorski has argued that the work is best understood as an examination of inter-generational vengeance-based conflict, or feuding. In this context, the poem operates as an indictment of feuding conflicts as a function of its conspicuous, circuitous, and lengthy depiction of the Swedish–Geatish wars—coming into contrast with the poem's depiction of the protagonist Beowulf as being disassociated from the ongoing feuds in every way. Francis Leneghan argues that the poem can be understood as a "dynastic drama" in which the hero's fights with the monsters unfold against a backdrop of the rise and fall of royal houses, while the monsters themselves serve as portents of disasters affecting dynasties.

== See also ==
- List of Beowulf characters
- "On Translating Beowulf"
- Sutton Hoo helmet § Beowulf
