= Euryalus (Phaeacian) =

Young Phaeacian nobleman in Greek mythology

In Greek mythology, Euryalus (/jʊəˈraɪ.ələs/; Ancient Greek: Εὐρύαλος) was a young Phaeacian nobleman and son of Naubolous.

== Mythology ==
In the Odyssey, Homer gives him the epithet "the peer of murderous Ares". Next to Laodamas, he is said to be the most handsome of the Phaeacians, and is the best wrestler. He convinces Laodamas to challenge Odysseus, then rebukes him when he refuses to participate, saying "No truly, stranger, nor do I think thee at all like one that is skilled in games, whereof there are many among men, rather art thou such an one as comes and goes in a benched ship, a master of sailors that are merchantmen, one with a memory for his freight, or that hath the charge of a cargo homeward bound, and of greedily gotten gains; thou seemest not a man of thy hands." When King Alcinous orders him to make amends, he gives Odysseus a bronze sword with a silver hilt and an ivory sheath.
