= Proceedings of the British Academy =

- Discipline: Humanities, social sciences
- Language: English

Publication details
- History: 1905–present
- Publisher: Oxford University Press (United Kingdom)
- Frequency: Irregular

Standard abbreviations
- ISO 4: Proc. Br. Acad.

Indexing
- ISSN: 0068-1202
- LCCN: 07036968
- OCLC no.: 1772818

Links
- Journal homepage

The Proceedings of the British Academy is a series of academic volumes on subjects in the humanities and social sciences. The first volume was published in 1905. Up to 1991, the volumes (appearing annually from 1927) mostly consisted of the texts of lectures and other papers read at the academy, plus obituary notices or "memoirs" of Fellows of the British Academy. From 1992 the Proceedings became an irregular series through the addition of thematic volumes of papers, typically derived from academic conferences held at the academy. After 2011–2012, the publication of the texts of lectures was transferred to the new online open access Journal of the British Academy, and the publication of obituary notices was transferred to a separate Biographical Memoirs of Fellows of the British Academy series. The Proceedings of the British Academy series therefore now focuses on the publication of themed volumes of essays, and is open to proposals from prospective volume editors.

The series is now published on behalf of the British Academy by Liverpool University Press. Before 01 July 2025, it was published by Oxford University Press. Since 2012 the contents of volumes have also been included in British Academy Scholarship Online.
