= William Witherle Lawrence =

American philologist (1876–1958)

- Born: 1876; Bangor, Maine, US
- Died: July 25, 1958 (aged 82); Portland, Maine, US
- Education: Bowdoin College; Leipzig University; Harvard University
- Awards: Royal Order of Vasa, First Class
- Scientific career
- Fields: Germanic philology
- Workplaces: Harvard University; University of Kansas; Columbia University

William Witherle Lawrence (1876 − July 25, 1958) was an American philologist who was a professor of English at Columbia University from 1905 to 1936.

== Biography ==
William Witherle Lawrence was born in Bangor, Maine, in 1876. His father, Franklin M. Lawrence, was the founder of the Portland Stove Foundry. Lawrence graduated from Bowdoin College in 1898. He received additional degrees from Leipzig University and Harvard University.

Lawrence taught German at Harvard University from 1900 to 1903. In 1903 he was appointed Professor of English at the University of Kansas. Since 1905 he served as Professor of English at Columbia University, where he would stay until his retirement in 1936. During World War I, Lawrence was an instructor in the Student Army Training Corps. He received an honorary Doctor of Letters degree from Bowdoin in 1917. He was an overseer of Bowdoin from 1921 to 1923, when he became a trustee. He was also a trustee of the Portland Public Library, the Portland Society of Art and the American-Scandinavian Foundation. In 1930 he was decorated with the Royal Order of Vasa, First Class.

Lawrence was the author of notable works on Beowulf, William Shakespeare, Johann Wolfgang von Goethe and other subjects. He was a fellow of the Medieval Society of America and the Modern Language Association of America. His clubs included the Century Association, Harvard Faculty and the Columbia Men's Faculty.

Lawrence retired from Columbia University in 1936. He died at his home in Portland, Maine on July 25, 1958.
