= Raymond Wilson Chambers =

British academic and author (1874–1942)

- Chambers in 1933
- Born: 12 November 1874; Staxton, England
- Died: 23 April 1942 (aged 67)
- Occupations: Scholar, author, academic

Raymond Wilson Chambers (12 November 1874 – 23 April 1942) was a British literary scholar, author, librarian and academic; throughout his career he was associated with University College London (UCL).

== Life ==
Chambers was born at Staxton, East Riding of Yorkshire (now North Yorkshire), on 12 November 1874, the only son of Thomas Herbert Chambers, commercial traveller, and Annie, daughter of William Wilson. The family was not financially stable- "as a boy he knew privation." Chambers was educated at University College, studying under such eminent scholars as W. P. Ker and A. E. Housman; he was Librarian at that institution from 1901 to 1922, and assistant professor in the English department, 1904–14. He served in World War I, with the Red Cross in France, and in Belgium with the YMCA/B.E.F. Chambers became Quain Professor of English at UCL in 1922. Chambers wrote on a wide variety of subjects relating to English literature, history, and culture; notably, he worked on the Shakespearean additions to the play Sir Thomas More, with Alfred W. Pollard and other scholars. His acclaimed 1935 biography, Thomas More, was awarded the James Tait Black Memorial Prize.

== Chambers and Tolkien ==
Chambers was a friend of J.R.R. Tolkien and their careers parallel each other at many points: both were Catholics (Tolkien a Roman and Chambers an Anglo-Catholic), scholars of Old English literature, both experienced the horrors of trench warfare in World War I (Chambers was too old to be an enlisted man, however), and both wrote influentially on Beowulf (Chambers' writings were one of the inspirations for Tolkien's "Beowulf: The Monsters and the Critics"). Thomas Shippey described Chambers as "a patron and supporter of Tolkien in his early years." Tolkien gladly read and re-read the Moro's biography written by Chambers.

Chambers wrote an article of criticism on a piece of prose relating to the earlier Middle English period Ancren Riwle. The edition he worked on was compiled by James Morton and, as Chambers believed, Morton's compilation is "a solid piece of work" that renovated Ancren Riwle in English. He concurs with his peers that the title of the work is translated as Rule. In his article "Recent Research Upon the Ancren Riwle", he compares the French version of the work with the English version and points out to some of the paradoxes that occur between the two, such as the occurrence of rhyme in the English version which is non-existent in the French one. He suggested that there is also another discrepancy between the original work and the English translation in that the original portrays three ladies whose life of martyrdom was characterized by pain in the earlier Middle English period, whereas the English translation imparts a sense of ambient kindness in their feminine lifestyle to the reader, along with an aura of pleasantness to be inferred from the Medieval period when reading the English translation.

John Garth writes that the title of The Book of Lost Tales "recalls R.W. Chambers' reference 'to the lost Tale of Wade,'" in a chapter of his study of the Old English poem Widsith that focuses on the old sea-legends of the ancient Germanic tribes of the north-western European coastlands (and which also deals with Éarendel). Chambers criticized the Romans for disdaining the Germanic peoples and failing to record their songs and tales, and laments the fact that, despite King Alfred's love for the old days, the Anglo Saxons wrote too few of them down: "'So this world of high-spirited, chivalrous song has passed away,’ says Chambers. 'It is our duty then to gather up reverently such fragments of the old Teutonic epic as fortune has preserved in our English tongue and to learn from them all we can of that collection of stories of which these fragments are the earliest vernacular record.'" This passage suggests that Chambers' work had inspired the broad outlines of Tolkien's original project—the piecing together of a mythology for England.

== Collections ==
Chambers donated c.600 books from his own collection to University College London during his lifetime; this material now forms the Chambers Book Collection. Chambers' sister Gertrude donated another c.600 books to the collection after his death in 1942. The Chambers Book collection includes editions of Thomas More's works and many books on English language and literature, often annotated by Chambers. The collection also consists of tracts on medieval English, French and German language and literature from the 19th century which were initially collected by German philologist Eugen Kolbing.

After Chambers' death his executors presented University College London with his personal papers. The archive contains material relating to all Chambers' published works, correspondence (including letters sent during his service in France and Belgium during the First World War), and notes on Piers Plowman and Thomas More. Shortly after the initial donation the archive received an additional donation of material from Chambers' colleague Elsie Hitchcock, who established the Chambers Memorial Lecture in his memory.

== Selected Chambers works ==
- Widsith: A Study in Old and English Heroic Legend, Kamal public school, 1912.
- Recent Research Upon the Ancren Riwle, London, Sidgwick & Jackson, 1925.
- Ruskin (and Others) on Byron, Oxford, Oxford University Press, 1925.
- On the Continuity of English Prose from Alfred to More and His School, London, Early English Text Society/Oxford University Press, 1932.
- Chapters on the Exeter Book, London, Percy Lund, Humphries & Co. Ltd. 1933
- Thomas More, London, Cape, 1935.
- The Place of St. Thomas More in English Literature and History, London, Longman, 1937.
- Man's Unconquerable Mind, London, Cape, 1939.
