= Wilbur Cross Medal =

- Wilbur Lucius Cross Medal for Alumni Achievement
- Awarded for: "distinguished achievements in scholarship, teaching, academic administration, and public service...."
- Sponsored by: Yale University
- Date: 1966; 60 years ago
- Location: 1 Hillhouse Avenue; New Haven 06511
- Country: United States
- Presented by: Graduate School Alumni Association
- Website: Official website

The Wilbur Cross Medal, or Wilbur Lucius Cross Medal for Alumni Achievement, is an award by the Yale University Graduate School Alumni Association to recognize "distinguished achievements in scholarship, teaching, academic administration, and public service."

== History ==
Named in honor of Wilbur Lucius Cross, the medal is given to a small group of individuals (up to six) annually, and was first awarded in 1966 to Edgar S. Furniss.

== Recipients ==
2026

Carol A. Carter
James Dieterich
Amy Richlin
James A. Robinson

2025
Philip J. Deloria
Samuel Jay Keyser
Andrew J. Lankford
Jeffrey E. Settleman

2024
Anne C. Ferguson-Smith
John D. Guillory
Kai Li
James C. Scott

2023
Elizabeth H. Bradley
Robert Gooding-Williams
James Jones
Che Chia-wei

2022
Virginia R. Domínguez
Philip Ewell
Kirk Johnson
Sarah Tishkoff

2021
Anat Admati
Tamer Basar
Donald Ingber
Mary Miller

2020
Matthew State
Brenda Elaine Stevenson
Dorceta Taylor
Veronica Vaida

2019
Ruth Garrett Millikan
Douglas R. Green
Susan M. Kidwell
Urjit Patel

2018
Elizabeth W. Easton
Kelsey Martin
Marianne Mithun
Tan Eng Chye

2017
Douglas Diamond
Donna J. Haraway
Eric J. Nestler
Lawrence W. Sherman

2016
Arend Lijphart
Ira Mellman
Arthur Nozik
Eleanor Sterling

2015
Carol S. Dweck
Philip Hanawalt
Jeremy Jackson
Jonathan Z. Smith
Thomas D. Pollard

2014
Eric Fossum
Thomas C. Holt
Kristin Luker
Edmund Phelps

2013
Fredric Jameson
Alan Lambowitz
Theodore J. Lowi
Annette Thomas

2012
John D. Aber
Alfred W. McCoy
Jonathan M. Rothberg
Sarah Grey Thomason

2011
Stanley Fish
Leslie F. Greengard
Bernice A. Pescosolido
Huntington F. Willard

2010
Stephen Greenblatt
Fred Greenstein
Timothy J. Richmond
Paul Wender
Jon Butler

2009
Laura L. Kiessling
Michael S. Levine
Richard J. Powell
William J. Willis

2008
Robert Axelrod
Stephen G. Emerson
Yoriko Kawaguchi
David M. Kennedy

2007
Carol T. Christ
Paul Friedrich
Anne Walters Robertson
John Suppe

2006
Eva Brann
Richard Brodhead
Mimi Gardner Gates
Lewis E. Kay
Richard A. Young

2005
Lincoln Pierson Brower
Peter B. Dervan
Jennifer L. Hochschild
Richard Rorty
Eric F. Wieschaus

2004
William Cronon
Hong Koo Lee
Julia Phillips
Peter Salovey
Barbara Schaal
Philip Zimbardo

2003
Edward L. Ayers
Gerald E. Brown
John Fenn
Robert D. Putnam
Charles Yanofsky
Susan Hockfield

2002
Linda Gordon
Sharon R. Long
Julia M. McNamara
David E. Price

2001
Elliot M. Meyerowitz
Stephen Owen
Roger N. Shepard
Ernesto Zedillo Ponce de León

2000
James G. Arthur
Evelyn Boyd Granville
Ruth Barcan Marcus
Shelley E. Taylor

1999
Francis S. Collins
William N. Fenton
Allen L. Sessoms
Rosemary A. Stevens
Geerat J. Vermeij

1998
Helen Murphy Tepperman
George A. Lindbeck
Peter Demetz
David M. Lee
Thomas Appelquist

1997
Alvin M. Liberman
Francis C. Oakley
G. Virginia Upton
Janet L. Yellen
Anne M. Briscoe
William Louis Gaines

1996
David C. McClelland
Marie Borroff
Miriam Usher Chrisman
James T. Laney
Heidi I. Hartmann

1995
Alfred Edward Kahn
Gordon H. Bower
Jennifer L. Kelsey
Mark E. Neely Jr.
Catharine A. MacKinnon

1994
Theodore Frederic Cooke Jr.
Vincent Scully
John Imbrie
Jerome John McGann
Thomas Eugene Lovejoy III
Zunyi Yang

1993
Walles T. Edmondson
Estella Leopold
Marcia L. Colish
Richard Charles Levin
Jaime Serra Puche

1992
Irving Rouse
Frances K. Graham
Raymond L. Garthoff
Gerald R. Fink
J. Dennis Huston
Judith Rodin

1991
W. Edwards Deming
Aubrey L. Williams
Maxine Singer
Joseph P. Allen
Russell G. Hamilton
Jerome J. Pollitt

1990
Franklin LeVan Baumer
Adolph Grünbaum
Thomas Kennerly Wolfe Jr.
Eleanor Holmes Norton
A. Bartlett Giamatti

1989
Pauline Newman
Paul Webster MacAvoy
Garry Wills
Mary Lou Pardue
Menno Boldt

1988
Ellis Crossman Maxcy
Charles Allen Walker
Joseph G. Gall
Gérard Lepoutre
Richard S. Westfall
Thomas Kaehao Seung

1987
Thomas Brennan Nolan
Harry Rudolph Rudin
Julian M. Sturtevant
Richard David Ellmann
Barbara Ann Feinn
Nannerl Overholser Keohane

1986
Robert Alan Dahl
A. Dwight Culler
Richard Derecktor Schwartz
Robert Joseph Birgeneau
Keith Stewart Thomson

1985
Eugene Mersereau Waith
Peter T. Flawn
Victor Brombert
John Paul Schiffer
Nelson Woolf Polsby

1984
Louis L. Martz
George Alexander Kubler
Homer D. Babbidge Jr.
Burton Edelson
Margaret W. Rossiter

1983
George Harry Ford
Floyd Lounsbury
Barbara Illingworth Brown
Daniel Berg
Morton H. Halperin

1982
Mary Ellen Jones
Richard N. Rosett
Theodore Ziolkowski

1981
Henry Margenau
Warren Hunting Smith
Bernard Nicholas Schilling
Jerome Kagan
Grace Evelyn Pickford

1980
Bingham Johnson Humphrey
Maurice Mandelbaum
Phyllis Ann Wallace
Wendell Garner

1979
Richard B. Sewall
Elizabeth Read Foster
Jacquelyn Mattfeld

1978
Jaroslav Pelikan
Thomas G. Bergin
Maynard Mack
Stephen Hopkins Spurr

1977
Gordon Sherman Haight
Mary Rosamund Haas
Joseph Austin Ranney
Jacob T. Schwartz

1976
Josephine P. Bree
James H. Wakelin Jr.
William G. Moulton
George Heard Hamilton
Laura Anna Bornholdt

1975
Robert Phelan Langlands
Ralph Henry Gabriel
Eliot Herman Rodnick
George Berkeley Young
Orville Gilbert Brim, Jr.
Donald Wayne Taylor

1974
Milton Harris
Amos Niven Wilder
Constance McLaughlin Green
Alvin Bernard Kernan

1973
Samuel Miller Brownell
George Wilson Pierson
Marshall Hall
Eleanor Jack Gibson
Preston E. Cloud

1972
Dumas Malone
John Collins Pope
Grace Murray Hopper
Lars Onsager

1971
Gladden Whetstone Baker
Ernest Hilgard
Jane Marion Oppenheimer
Bernard Knox
John Robert Silber

1970
Roland Herbert Bainton
Bertrand Harris Bronson
Leona Baumgartner
Melvin Spencer Newman
Lucian Pye

1969
George Gaylord Simpson
Murray Barnson Emeneau
Allan Murray Cartter
James Patrick Shannon
John Perry Miller
Joshua Lederberg

1968
James Bliss Austin
William M. Fairbank
James G. March
F. S. C. Northrop

1967
Carl Blegen
Robert W. Buchheim
Neal E. Miller
George Murdock
Marjorie Hope Nicolson
Wallace Notestein
Frederick A. Pottle
Luther A. Weigle

1966
Edgar S. Furniss
