= Ezra Stiles College =

Residential college at Yale University

- Residential college at Yale University
- Yale University
- Coat of arms of Ezra Stiles College
- Location: 19 Tower Parkway
- Coordinates: 41.3125°N 72.9306°W
- Nickname: Stilesians
- Established: 1961
- Named for: Ezra Stiles
- Colors: Black, Gold
- Sister college: Currier House, Harvard; Queens' College, Cambridge
- Head: Michael Koelle
- Dean: Murphy Temple
- Undergraduates: 478 (2013-2014)
- Mascot: A. Bartlett Giamatti Memorial Moose
- Website: ezrastiles.yalecollege.yale.edu

Ezra Stiles College is one of the fourteen residential colleges at Yale University in New Haven, Connecticut. Built in 1961 and designed by Eero Saarinen, the college is named after Ezra Stiles, the seventh President of Yale. Architecturally, it is known for its lack of right angles between walls in the living areas. It sits next to Morse College.

== Origin ==
In his report on the 1955–56 academic year, Yale President A. Whitney Griswold announced his intention to add at least one residential college to Yale's two-decade-old system. "We have the colleges so full that community life, discipline, education, even sanitation are suffering," he said. After several years of speculation about the possibility of four or five new colleges, the university confirmed the construction of two new colleges in spring 1959, choosing Eero Saarinen (Yale School of Architecture '34) as the project architect and the Old York Square behind the Graduate School as the site. The Old Dominion Foundation, established by Paul Mellon (Yale College '29), provided funding for the construction of Stiles and Morse, calling for the building of two "radically different" residential colleges in order to reduce over-crowding.

== Design ==
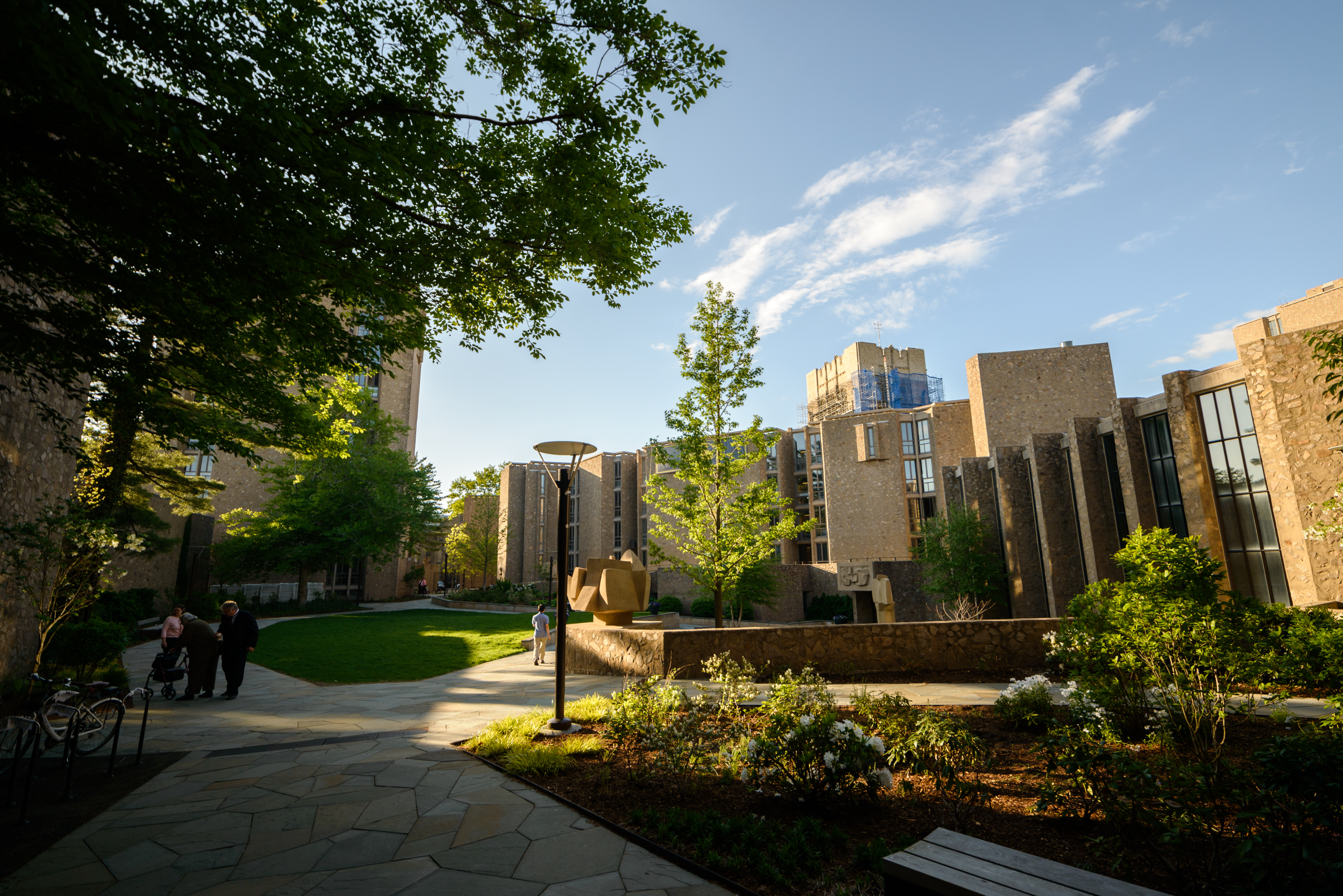
Courtyard of the college, with Payne Whitney Gymnasium in background

The college is built of rubble masonry in the style of pre-Gothic Tuscan towers, similar to those in the medieval Italian hill town of San Gimignano. Many architecture critics regard the college as a "masterpiece of American architecture," though it is considered one of the "ugly ducklings" of Yale. The college consists of many single rooms and suites, and in a modern attempt to capture the spirit of Gothic architecture, Saarinen eliminated all right angles from the living areas.

Stiles' adjacent "twin" residential college Morse is architecturally similar, was built at the same time, and has an adjoining dining room with a common kitchen. Architecturally, Morse and Stiles differ from older colleges by having more private space per student and the lowest ratio of natural light aperture to wall surface.

Saarinen wrote in a description of the architectural plans: "Somehow, the architecture had to declare them as colleges, not dormitories." Saarinen continued: "We have made the buildings polygonal—their shapes derived in order to provide the diversity of student rooms, to answer the needs of the site, and to give variety and sequence of spatial experiences in the courts. We conceived of these colleges as citadels of earthy, monolithic masonry - buildings where masonry walls would be dominant and whose interiors of stone, oak, and plaster would carry out the spirit of strength and simplicity. Since handicraft methods are anachronistic, we found a new technological method for making these walls: these are 'modern' masonry walls made without masons."

Because none of the interior walls make right angles, many of Stiles' dorm rooms are furnished with built-in desks and bookshelves. The college was once heated by a system that warmed the stone floors, but maintenance troubles led Yale to abandon it and install radiators.

The back of the Yale University bookstore acts as a wall in the courtyard.

In fall 2010, the refurbishment of adjoining Morse College gave Stiles students access to a new gym, dance studio, and the Underground Crescent Theater. Work on Stiles itself began in summer 2010, and was complete by August 2011. Among other things, it added suites to the college and refurbished several massive lighting fixtures designed by UCLA sculptor Oliver Andrews, meant to be abstract and contemporary versions of "the sort of thing you'd find in an ancient castle".

== Student life ==
Courtyard of Ezra Stiles College

The mascot is the A. Bartlett Giamatti Memorial Moose. Ezra Stiles students presented the college with the taxidermy moose head in 1972 when they found out that the then College Master A. Bartlett Giamatti would be leaving the role with instructions not to hang his picture in the college, as had been the custom. Giamatti in 1977 became Yale's youngest president, and in 1989 was named Commissioner of Baseball. Giamatti's son, actor Paul Giamatti, lived in the Head of College's House on the Ezra Stiles College grounds from birth through age five. The moose appears on much of the Ezra Stiles apparel and is part of the Ezra Stiles cheer.

Stiles has had success in Yale's intramural sports program, winning the Tyng Cup — presented to the residential college with the best intramural sports performance — in 1964, 1988, 1990, 1991, 1992, 1994, 1995, 2003, 2004, 2005, and 2025. This 11-cup total places Stiles just one behind leader Timothy Dwight College. Stiles' 2025 championship broke a 20-year drought and culminated in a parade from Pauli Murray College back to Stiles.

Ezra Stiles and Morse used to co-host an annual Casino Night since the early 1990s, until it was shut down due to legal concerns. A formal affair, the event featured casino-style games and live music. Stilesians also host an annual "Medieval (K)night." For one night in April, the dining hall is transformed into a medieval banquet hall, and students enjoy medieval fare and dramatic re-enactments of "Beowulf" and dragon battles after besieging and pillaging rival colleges. In addition to raiding other colleges, Stiles has historically also pranked their fellow residential colleges. In 2019, the "Morse" banner in the Morse dining hall was edited overnight to read "Moose". While the culprits were never caught, Stilesians were the prime suspects.

The college is well known for a robust arts community, maintaining a student-run art gallery, and holding "Stiles Arts Week" for over 40 years. During Arts Week, the college hosts study breaks and activities which have included painting pots for succulents, workshops in stop-motion animation, and open mic nights. For Arts Week 2020, the week kicked off with a 12-hour knitting marathon called "The Great Knit." Recently Arts Week has included the Stiles Student Film Festival, a formal affair featuring films from all Yale students regardless of major or residential college affiliation. Arts Week culminates in a "classical brunch," in which Stiles musicians perform classical music during brunch.

== Heads and deans ==
Heads of Ezra Stiles College	Term
Richard B. Sewall	1959–1970
A. Bartlett Giamatti	1970–1972
Hans Wilhelm Frei	1972–1980
Heinrich von Staden	1980–1986
Traugott Lawler	1986–1995
Paul Fry	1995–2002
Traugott Lawler	2002–2003 (Acting)
Stuart B. Schwartz	2003–2008
Stephen Pitti (as Head of college after April 27, 2016)	2008–2020
Alicia Schmidt Camacho	2020–2025
Michael Koelle	2025– present

Deans of Ezra Stiles College	Term
John Wilkinson	1963–1964
Ernest Thompson	1964–1973
Herbert Atherton	1973–1982
Rita Brackman	1982–1991
Mary Peckham	1991–1992
Susan Rieger	1992–2002
Jennifer Wood	2002–2010
Camille Lizarribar	2010–2016
Michelle Morgan	2016 (Interim)
Nilakshi Parndigamage	2016–2020
Murphy Temple	2020–present

In 2016, the title of "Master" was changed to "Head of College".

== Notable alumni ==
- Akhil Amar, constitutional law professor (ES '80)
- Anne Barnard, journalist, The New York Times (ES '92)
- Ellen Barry, Chief International Correspondent, The New York Times (ES '92)
- Frances Beinecke, environmentalist (ES '71)
- Paul Bremer, director and proconsul of post-war Iraq Coalition Provisional Authority (ES '63)
- Jack Dalrymple, former Governor of North Dakota (ES '70)
- Dan Froomkin, political columnist and blogger, The Washington Post (ES '85)
- David Gergen, presidential advisor and political commentator (ES '63)
- Sara Gilbert, actress (ES '97)
- Rob Glaser, technology executive (ES '84)
- Paul Goldberger, architecture critic (ES '72)
- Mark Harris, journalist and author (ES '85)
- George Hickenlooper, filmmaker (ES '86)
- Mitch Kapor, founder, Lotus Development Corp. (ES '71)
- Robert G. Kaiser, associate editor, The Washington Post (ES '64)
- Lloyd Kaufman, director, producer, and owner of Troma Entertainment. (ES '69)
- Brett Kavanaugh, Associate Justice of the Supreme Court of the United States. (ES '87)
- Zoe Kazan, actress and writer (ES '05)
- Phil LaMarr, actor and comedian (ES '89)
- Mark Linn-Baker, actor (ES '79)
- Rebecca Miller, filmmaker and writer (ES '84)
- Edward Norton, actor (ES '91)
- Barrington Daniels Parker Jr., federal appellate judge (ES '65)
- Nathaniel Persily, law professor (ES '92)
- Alexandra Robbins, journalist and author (ES '98)
- Amanda Silver, screenwriter and film producer (ES '85)
- Hampton Sides, historian, author and journalist (ES '84)
- Robert Simonds, film producer and entertainment executive (ES '85)
- Lamar Smith, U.S. congressman from Texas (ES '69)
- Tom Steyer, hedge fund manager, philanthropist, and environmentalist (ES '79)
- Alex Timbers, writer/director and founder of Les Freres Corbusier (ES '01)
- Jessica Tuck, actress (ES '86)
- Sheldon Whitehouse, U.S. Senator from Rhode Island (ES '78)
- Bob Woodward, asst. managing editor and political reporter, The Washington Post (ES '65)
- John Yarmuth, U.S. Congressman from Kentucky (ES '69)
