= Enzyme-activated MR contrast agents =

Molecular imaging is broadly defined as the visualization of molecular and cellular processes on either a macro- or microscopic level. Because of its high spatial resolution and ability to noninvasively visualize internal organs, magnetic resonance (MR) imaging is widely believed to be an ideal platform for in vivo molecular imaging. For this reason, MR contrast agents that can detect molecular events are an active field of research. One group of compounds that has shown particular promise is enzyme-activated MR contrast agents.

Enzyme-activated MR contrast agents are compounds that cause a detectable change in image intensity when in the presence of the active form of a certain enzyme. This makes them useful for in vivo assays of enzyme activity. They are distinguished from current, clinical MR contrast agents that give only anatomical information, such as aqueous gadolinium compounds, by their ability to make molecular processes visible. Enzyme-activated contrast agents are powerful tools for molecular imaging. To date, β-galactosidase-activated contrast agents have attracted the most attention in the literature, although there no theoretical reason that other enzymes could not be used to activate contrast agents. Also, mechanisms other than enzyme activation, such as Ca^{2+}-dependent activation, can theoretically be used.

In general, enzyme-activated agents contain a paramagnetic metal ion which can affect the T_{1} or T_{2} relaxation times for nearby water molecules. However, the metal ions are unable to interact with the water until an enzyme-catalyzed reaction takes place. Steric hindrance or coordination with other ions prevents water from accessing the paramagnetic center prior to the enzymatic reaction.

== Structure of β-galactosidase-activated contrast agents ==
The α-series of β-galactosidase-activated MR contrast agents. Prior to cleavage, the sugar blocks water from accessing the gadolinium ion. The active enzyme will cleave the sugar, allowing water to interact with the paramagnetic center.

Two distinct β-galactosidase-activated contrast agents have been reported. Both consist of a Gd(III) ion complexed with a tetraazamacrocycle. At the N-10 position, a two-carbon chain links the gadolinium-tertaazamacrocycle complex to a molecule of galactose. The galactose is linked to the complex by a β-glycosidic bond at its C-1 position.

The two forms of the contrast agent differ only in the location of a single methyl group. The first class, known as the α-series, has a methyl group bound to the carbon that is α to the tetraazamacrocycle. The other class, called the β-series, has a methyl attached to the β carbon relative to the tetraazamacrocycle. The position of this methyl group is significant for the structure of the agent, and thus determines the mechanism by which the non-active compound shields the Gd(III) ion from interacting with water. The α-series adopts a conformation in which the sugar lies directly over the paramagnetic center, thus sterically preventing water from accessing the gadolinium. The β-series, on the other hand, blocks water from the gadolinium by coordinating with a carbonate ion. There is no evidence that the stereochemical orientation of the methyl-bearing carbon affects the either the enzyme-catalyzed cleavage or the ability of the sugar to exclude water from the gadolinium ion.

Studies have shown that the α-series is far more effective at blocking water from the paramagnetic center prior to cleavage. The need to coordinate with a carbonate ion and the lower level of signal suppression inherent to the β-series make the α-series a better candidate for use in research and clinical medicine.

== Mechanism of activation ==
The β-galactosidase-catalyzed reaction that activates the contrast agent.

In a tissue where active β-galactosidase is present, the sugar will be cleaved from the rest of the compound. This permits water to access the paramagnetic center, and causes the magnetic relaxation properties of the surrounding water molecules to change. This change in relaxation times will, in turn, visibly alter the signal intensity of images of the tissue obtained from MR scans.

The mechanism proceeds in the same manner as all other β-galactosidase-catalyzed cleavages. The carboxyl group on a glutamic acid side chain within the enzyme acts as an acid catalyst, hastening the cleavage of the glycosidic bond at the C-1 position in the sugar. This cleavage gives water access to the paramagnetic center. The result of the enzyme-catalyzed reaction is a free galactose molecule and an activated contrast agent.

== Uses ==
There are obvious potential uses to this technology, both in research and clinical medicine.

=== Basic research ===
In a research context, the α-series of β-galactosidase-activated MR contrast agents has been used to visualize the development and gene expression of cells in a Xenopus laevis embryo. Researchers injected the agent into both cells of a two-cell stage embryo, and then injected only one of the cells with mRNA for the enzyme. Following a period of growth, they obtained MR images of the embryo that clearly displayed signal enhancement only in the cells derived from the parent cell that had been injected with both the enzyme and the contrast agent.

This study demonstrates the value of whole body, in vivo molecular imaging methods for basic research. Such techniques permit scientists to test for gene activity and enzyme function throughout an organism. In contrast, many existing assays (such as fixation of cells on paraffin wax followed by immunostaining) only permit the analysis of a few cells at a time. These methods kill the cells, thus making time-series studies difficult. They also require the researcher to have identified a tissue of interest before obtaining the cells.

The rise of whole-body molecular imaging methods may permit scientists to see where in an organism an enzyme is active without damaging cells; imaging could be repeated at multiple time points to monitor changes in gene expression or enzyme activity. Similar techniques have attracted considerable interest from researchers studying cancer and cardiovascular disease.

=== Clinical medicine ===
The ability to detect tissues that contain the active form of an enzyme at certain time has clear value in medicine. Specific contrast agents that provide enhancement only in the presence of active enzymes could allow doctors to conclusively and noninvasively assay for a wide variety of enzymatic diseases, such as fructose bisphosphatase deficiency. However, such diagnostic tools would require the development of contrast agents specific to the enzyme of interest, and would necessitate the development of methods for delivering the agents to cells (see “Limitations” below).

== Limitations ==
Once the contrast agent has been activated by cleavage of the sugar group, the signal enhancing effects will only diminish if the gadolinium is washed out of the compartment containing it, or if water’s access to the metal group is again inhibited. So, to prevent permanent enhancement of the MR signal, cells must either have a way to export the gadolinium group to the bloodstream, or they must be able to replace the cleaved sugar group. There is no data in the literature indicating that either approach is feasible in vivo, suggesting that these methods may result in permanent signal amplification.

Another challenge is the delivery of the contrast agents to target cells. In the sole paper describing in vivo use of enzyme-activated MR contrast agents, the agent was delivered to embryonic cells via a micropipette. However, the authors of the paper acknowledge that this is not a feasible approach for many research projects, and it presents a clear impediment to clinical use. There is active research in using the cell’s native import machinery to load contrast agents.
