= Barbara Illingworth Brown =

American biochemist

- Born: Barbara A. Illingworth; May 12, 1924; Hartford, CT
- Died: September 27, 2016
- Education: Yale University; Smith College
- Scientific career
- Workplaces: Washington University in St. Louis
- Thesis: Effects of purified growth hormone on glycogen storage (1950)
- Doctoral advisor: Jane Anne Russell

Barbara Illingworth Brown was an American biochemist. She worked primarily at Washington University in St. Louis.

== Education and career ==
Brown was born in Hartford, Connecticut and later moved to Pennsylvania when her father's job in insurance moved the family. Brown graduated from Smith College in 1946. She worked with Jane Anne Russell at Yale University and received her PhD in physiological chemistry in 1950. Following her Ph.D., Brown applied to work with the Nobel Prize-winner Gerty Cori and became a Research Associate Professor of Biochemistry at Washington University School of Medicine and Established Investigator of the American Heart Association. She later also worked with Cori's husband and fellow Nobel Prize winner Carl Ferdinand Cori. She retired in 1989.

Brown served on the National Advisory General Medical Sciences Council at the National Institutes of Health from 1972 to 1974. She was awarded the Wilbur Cross Medal from Yale in 1983.

== Research ==
Her work was primarily devoted to the biochemistry of inherited metabolic diseases. She investigated the structure of glycogen and amylopectins, and defined the pathway and mechanisms of phosphorylase enzymes. Her research included the discovery of enzymes in a previously unknown pathway to process glycogen. She went on to research diseases related to the storage of glycogen where these enzymes were absent. She applied some of Carl Cori's findings to medical cases, and confirmed the second known case of fructose bisphosphatase deficiency, a rare metabolic disorder, in 1970. She played a similar role in therapeutic research into glycogen storage disease type I.

== Personal life ==
Her husband, David H. Brown, was also a scientist and they collaborated on research on polysaccharide synthesis and glycogen storage diseases. Brown and her husband had been married for 59 years before his passing in 2011, and had two children, three grandchildren, and three great gradchildren.

== Selected publications ==
- ILLINGWORTH, BARBARA A; RUSSELL, JANE A (1951). "The Effects of Growth Hormone on Glycogen in Tissues of the Rat1". Endocrinology. 48 (4): 423–434. doi:10.1210/endo-48-4-423. ISSN 0013-7227. OCLC 4631825308. PMID 14831545.
- Illingworth, Barbara; Jansz, Hendrik S.; Brown, David H.; Cori, Carl F. (1958-12-15). "Observations on the Function of Pyridoxal-5-Phosphate in Phosphorylase". Proceedings of the National Academy of Sciences. 44 (12): 1180–1191. Bibcode:1958PNAS...44.1180I. doi:10.1073/pnas.44.12.1180. ISSN 0027-8424. PMC 528705. PMID 16590330.
- Illingworth, Barbara; Brown, David H.; Cori, Carl F. (1961-04-01). "The De Novo Synthesis of Polysaccharide by Phosphorylase". Proceedings of the National Academy of Sciences. 47 (4): 469–478. Bibcode:1961PNAS...47..469I. doi:10.1073/pnas.47.4.469. ISSN 0027-8424. PMC 221475. PMID 13717528.
- Eberlein, Walter R; Illingworth, Barbara A; Sidbury, James B (1962). "Heterogeneous glycogen storage disease in siblings and favorable response to synthetic androgen administration". AJM the American Journal of Medicine. 33 (1): 20–26. doi:10.1016/0002-9343(62)90273-5. ISSN 0002-9343. OCLC 4922525423. PMID 13889017.
- Brown, Barbara Illingworth; Brown, David H (1966). "Lack of an α -1,4-Glucan: α -1,4-Glucan 6-glycosyl Transferase in a Case of Type IV Glycogenosis". Proceedings of the National Academy of Sciences of the United States of America. 56 (2): 725–729. Bibcode:1966PNAS...56..725B. doi:10.1073/pnas.56.2.725. ISSN 0027-8424. OCLC 5554094258. PMC 224432. PMID 5229990.
