= Jane Anne Russell =

American endocrinologist

Jane Ann Russell Wilhelmi
- Born: February 9, 1911
- Died: March 12, 1967 (aged 56)
- Education: University of California, Berkeley
- Scientific career
- Workplaces: Yale University; Emory University
- Thesis: Carbohydrate metabolism in the hypophysectomized rat (1937)
- Doctoral students: Barbara Illingworth Brown

Jane Anne Russell (also called Jane Anne Russell Wilhelmi; February 9, 1911 – March 12, 1967) was an endocrinologist. She researched pituitary extract.

== Education ==
Russell graduated from Long Beach Polytechnic High School, California, in 1928, as the second best student in her class. At age 17, she entered the University of California Berkeley, and graduated in 1932 as first in her class. She was awarded the California Fellowship in Biochemistry in 1934 and the Rosenberg Fellowship in 1935.

Russell obtained her PhD in 1937 working at the Institute of Experimental Biology at the University of California, Berkeley on the study of pituitary hormones in carbohydrate metabolism.

== Career ==
Following her Ph.D., she continued at the University of California, Berkeley doing post-doctoral research on a Porter fellowship from the American Physiological Society. In 1938 she moved to Yale University, where she first worked as a postdoctoral investigator and was an instructor from 1941 until 1950 when she moved to Emory University. She taught biochemistry at Emory University from 1950 to 1967. During 1954–57 Russell worked on the committee of the United States National Research Council, then during 1958–64 at the National Science Foundation. She became a full professor at Emory University in 1965.

== Research ==
In 1936, Russell spent time working with the Nobel-prize winning couple Carl Ferdinand Cori and Gerty Cori researching the impact of epinephrine and insulin on metabolism.

=== Pituitary gland research ===
Russell's major research indicated that fasting rats lose muscle glycogen following pituitary removal and injections of pituitary extract can prevent weight loss. She determined the relationship between the anterior pituitary and carbohydrates. Her work allowed the further isolation and identification of growth hormones.

== Recognition ==
Russell was awarded the Kraft Prize, Phi Beta Kappa Key, Steward Scholarship, and University Gold Medal. In 1945 she received the CIBA award of the Endocrine Society. She worked on the National Institutes of Health peer review committee, and was Vice President of the Endocrine Society. Russell was awarded the Upjohn Award of the Endocrine Society in 1961 and elected a member of Sigma Xi.

== Personal life ==
Russell married Alfred Ellis Wilhelmi in 1940. She enjoyed gardening, sewing and origami. Russell developed breast cancer in 1962, but worked to the end of her life.
