= Traugott Lawler =

American historian (born 1937)

- Born: March 8, 1937 (age 89); Nyack, New York, U.S.
- Occupations: Medievalist; historian
- Spouse: Margaret Lawler (m. 1958)
- Relatives: Mike Lawler (great nephew)

Academic background
- Education: College of the Holy Cross (BA); University of Wisconsin (MA); Harvard University (PhD)
- Thesis: John of Garland's Parisiana poetria de arte prosaica, metrica, et rithmica (1966)

Academic work
- Discipline: Medieval history
- Sub-discipline: Medieval literature Medieval English
- Institutions: Yale University

Traugott Francis Lawler (born March 8, 1937) is an American medievalist. He is an authority on English poet William Langland and Medieval English. Lawler is a professor emeritus of English at Yale University, where he served as the master of Ezra Stiles College and also as a lecturer in religion and literature.

== Early life and education ==
Lawler was born and raised in Nyack, New York. He was descended from an Irish family, and his parents were Irish New Yorkers. He attended the Jesuit Regis High School, where his father and some of his brothers also attended, graduating in 1954 as the vice president of his senior class. During high school, Lawler discovered an affinity with English literature due to two teachers. He later recalled that at age 16 he read Pride and Prejudice, which inspired him to read nineteenth-century English fiction.

After high school, Lawler matriculated at the College of the Holy Cross on a Naval ROTC scholarship. He entered college as a basketball student athlete but decided to quit the team in freshman year. His first two years in college were spent receiving a classical education of Greek, Latin, English, French, and history. In his sophomore year, Lawler sought to major in English to prepare for law school and was elected as the president of his class. He later resolved to be a "college English teacher" with a specialty in Middle English and graduated with a Bachelor of Arts, cum laude, in 1958.

After three years as an officer in the U.S. Marine Corps, Lawler spent a year studying at the University of Wisconsin on a Danforth Fellowship, obtaining a Master of Arts (M.A.) in 1962. At the recommendation of a professor, he transferred to Harvard University that same year for further graduate study. There, Lawler came under the influence of medievalist Morton W. Bloomfield, who also supervised his dissertation on John of Garland. He earned his Doctor of Philosophy (Ph.D.) from Harvard in 1966.

== Academic career ==
After obtaining his doctorate, Lawler became an instructor at Yale University and was made a fellow of Davenport College. He taught from 1966 to 1972, during which period he taught Old English and served as the assistant director of graduate studies in English. He left untenured to become a professor at Northwestern University, where he would teach until 1981. At Northwestern, Lawler taught topics including Geoffrey Chaucer and English literature. In 1977, Lawler was named a fellow of the American Council of Learned Societies, and worked on a project titled "The one and the many in the Canterbury Tales."

Lawler returned to Yale in 1981 as a professor of English. In 1983, he was named a Guggenheim Fellow. From 1986 to 1995, he served as the master of Ezra Stiles College and was its acting master from 2002 to 2003 before Stuart B. Schwartz assumed the role. Under Lawler's leadership, Ezra Stiles College at Yale University experienced intramural success. During his first tenure as Master, Stiles won the Tyng Cup in six out of eight years. During his second term of service as Master, Ezra Stiles again won the Tyng Cup and continued to win in two subsequent years under the guidance of Schwartz. In addition to his role as master, Lawler also served as the college's librarian.

Lawler retired from teaching in June 2005 to prepare a commentary on the known versions of Piers Plowman with other scholars. The book was released by the University of Pennsylvania Press. He continued to teach Yale alumni in weekly sessions, including those on The Canterbury Tales.

== Personal life ==
Traugott is the younger brother of environmental engineer John P. Lawler, founder of Lawler, Matusky, & Skelly Engineers, which was later acquired by HDR, Inc. Traugott is the great-uncle of Mike Lawler, a Republican Member of Congress.

Lawler married his wife, Margaret (Peggy) Lawler, shortly after graduating from Holy Cross. He has four children—Peter, Dan, Kate, and Greg—and eight grandchildren. He and his wife live in Hamden, Connecticut. Lawler is Catholic.

== Notes ==
=== Additional sources ===
- Lawler, Traugott (2015). "Many People and a Few Books" (PDF). Henry Koerner Center for Emeritus Faculty. Intellectual Trajectory Talks. 3. Yale University: 87–98.

== Selected works ==
- Traugott Lawler, ed. and trans., John of Garland's Parisiana poetria de arte prosaica, metrica, et rithmica (Cambridge, Mass.: Ph.D. thesis, Harvard University, 1966).
- Traugott Lawler, The One and the Many in the Canterbury Tales (Hamden, Conn.: Archon Books, 1980).
- Traugott Lawler, ed. and trans., The Parisiana Poetria of John of Garland, Yale Studies in English 182 (New Haven: Yale University Press, 1974).
- Traugott Lawler, ed., "Boece," in The Riverside Chaucer (Houghton Mifflin Company, 1987).
- Traugott Lawler, "The Pardon Formula in Piers Plowman: Its Ubiquity, Its Binary Shape, Its Silent Middle Term," The Yearbook of Langland Studies ( YLS ), volume 14, (2000, ISBN 1-58044-027-4)
- Traugott Lawler, "The Secular Clergy in Piers Plowman", with Míċeál F. Vaughan, "Response", The Yearbook of Langland Studies ( YLS ), volume 16, (2003, ISBN 1-58044-077-0)
- Traugott Lawler, ed. and trans., Parisiana poetria, Dumbarton Oaks Meideval Library 65 (Cambridge, Massachusetts: Harvard University Press, 2020).
