= Environmental privilege =

Environmental privilege is a concept in environmental sociology, referring to the ability of privileged groups to keep environmental amenities for themselves and deny them to less privileged groups. More broadly, it refers to the ability of privileged groups to keep an exclusive grip on the advantages of "social place," including non-ecological amenities. It has been characterized as "the other side of the coin" from environmental racism. Like other forms of racial privilege, it does not depend on personal racism, but rather structural racism. Environmental privilege is a consequence of both class and racial privilege with respect to access to the overall environment, influencing the social and economic realm. It is the result of cultural, economic, and political power being wielded. It provides exclusive access to environmental facilities such as elite neighborhoods that contain exclusive rivers, parks, and open areas to particular people. These groups are more likely to participate in sustainable efforts and have access to premium amenities. Furthermore, during the COVID-19 epidemic, wealthy communities were able to better adhere to safety protocols.

== Background ==
The concept of environmental privilege first developed from the historical scholarship of Dorceta Taylor, who led the shift in scholarship on environmental racism away from consideration of environmental disadvantage in isolation, and toward a more holistic approach that accounted for the discriminatory effects of restrictive zoning. In her book, The rise of the American Conservation Movement , Taylor describes how early conservation efforts in America set the stage for the reservation of natural resources and amenities for the wealthy. She describes how the conservation movement in the United States began in the middle of the nineteenth century by white American elites with Eurocentric ideologies that mirrored Manifest Destiny. Their chief aim was to preserve the wilderness and reserve the serene landscapes for themselves, displacing Indigenous communities in the West. The preservation of the wilderness, in turn, reserved the land for white America. The conservation movement has involvement in racism, sterilization, and eugenics, and ultimately resulted in the exclusivity of nature for white male recreation. Scholars state that people of color, Indigenous communities, and the working class are more likely to live around hazardous waste, emission producing power plants, mining, and live in areas with a high probably for natural disasters. Environmental privilege is said to be the origin of this environmental polarity between the haves and the have-nots. Lisa Sun-Hee Park and David Pellow's book The Slums of Aspen: Immigrants VS. the Environment in America's Eden, outline these connections, specifying how environmental privilege is enjoyed by a small, wealthy population and the rest confront environmental burdens. This is studied on a local and global scale. Poor communities face ecological devastation from the exploitation of resources. This includes deforestation, intensive agriculture, fossil fuel mining, and the dumping of electronic waste, all of which occur among poor communities globally.

== Food Access ==
Today's environmental movement is maintained predominantly by wealthy whites in urban centers, therefore the city reflects the white perspective and mirrors their culture. Environmental privilege is often used in critiques of green gentrification, where environmental amenities such as urban agriculture cater largely to white or otherwise privileged urban groups. It has proven particularly illuminating in understanding the correlation between whiteness and participation in farmer's markets. Research shows low to middle-class African Americans are less likely to involve themselves in farmer's markets or other methods of alternative food institutions as opposed to conventional food resources. Alternative food institutions are often held in primarily white, affluent communities, thereby creating the exclusivity of healthy, organic food. High-priced organic foods and luxurious and energy-efficient infrastructure generates uneven development in cities, causing low-income families to concentrate in devalued regions. The process of demarcated devaluation in cities, as described by Nathan McClintock, results in food deserts.

== Housing and health inequities ==
Environmental Privilege provides benefits such as eco-friendly lifestyles, sustainable living, and green consumerism. Access to greater green space and cleaner air in neighborhoods, and energy-efficient, LEED certified structures are just a few examples. In addition, there is access to alternative markets where sustainable apparel and food can be purchased, yet overall customary designs for exclusion are reproduced. Historically, policy makers and city planners quarantined low-income and devalued centers from newly developed urban spaces. As a result, sustainable goods and services along with new environmental projects are reserved for the wealthy. Affluent people oftentimes pollute the most via greenhouse gas emissions, waste, and over consumption, while low income communities endure their negative externalities: landfills, superfund sites, city pollution, and toxic runoff are a few examples. Zoning policies reduce the number of affordable housing available to migrant workers in Aspen. The wealthy resort town fought hard to prevent low-income families from moving in because they believed it would ruin their image. In turn, workers resort to living in dangerous spaces like flood plains and must to drive up to one-hundred miles to reach their place of employment.

During the height of the COVID-19 pandemic, affluent individuals had better access to resources, medical treatment, and housing. Wealthy communities were able to leave the dense cities and travel to more rural areas, second homes, or vacation spots. Infection-rates studied in Sweden revealed that low-income communities were six-times more likely to catch the virus than affluent communities. In another analysis, African Americans and LatinX communities in the U.S. contracted COVID-19 more so than white communities because many blue-collar jobs were considered "essential" during the pandemic. Unsafe interactions with other people in dense cities and neighborhoods created a higher probability of contracting the virus. Many wealthy whites, on the other hand, were able to work from home, go on vacation, or minimize the hours worked.

== Access to nature ==
Author Justin Farrell in Billionaire Wilderness (2020) argues that there are powerful connections between nature and wealthy Americans, and that preservation of the environment is a tool utilized by affluent U.S. citizens to increase their earnings and establish exclusive pockets of the United States for themselves, often masking their influence as philanthropy. In Aspen, Colorado, American elites indulge in the picturesque scenery of surrounding nature and satiate themselves in luxurious amenities provided by migrant employees working in the tourist industry. It is the lower class who facilitate much of the opulent services to the wealthy whilst living in poverty.

Billionaire Wilderness explores how the ultra-rich are buying up land and utilizing one of the world's most pristine ecosystems to climb even further up the socioeconomic ladder, weaving captivating storytelling with thought-provoking analysis. In Teton County, Wyoming, the well-off are tormented by stigmas, shame, and concern about their social standing, and who appropriate nature and rural people to create more virtuous and deserving versions of themselves. Billionaire Wilderness uncovers the hidden links between wealth concentration and the environment, two of the most serious and contested concerns of our day. Teton County, with a per capita income of $194,485, has the highest per capita income of all 3,144 counties in the United States, according to the US Department of Commerce. New York County (Manhattan) is a distant second at $148, 002, and Wheeler County, Georgia is the lowest in the US at $15,787. Teton County has one of the highest median family incomes in the country, at $96,113, putting it in the top 2.6 percent of all counties in the country. Teton County was not always prosperous, but as time passed, the local economy improved.

== See also ==
- Environmental justice
