= John C. Pope =

American Old English scholar (1904–1997)

John Collins Pope (December 4, 1904 – April 18, 1997) was an American scholar of Old English. He taught at Yale University English Department from 1928 to 1971, where he was William Lampson Professor Emeritus of English at the time of his death. He was described by fellow Old English specialist Fred C. Robinson as "the leading Old English scholar of his generation".

Born in Cleveland, Ohio, Pope was educated at the Taft School and Yale University (BA 1925; PhD 1931). He then joined Yale's faculty, remaining there for his entire career. He produced editions of several Old English texts. He also proposed a scansion system for Old English in which rhythmic stress is assigned using musical patterns.

Pope was elected a Corresponding Fellow of the British Academy in 1968 and a Fellow of the Medieval Academy of America in 1972. He received the Wilbur Cross Medal in 1972. A festschrift in his honour, Old English Studies in Honour of John C. Pope, was published in 1974.
