= Carol A. Carter =

American microbiologist

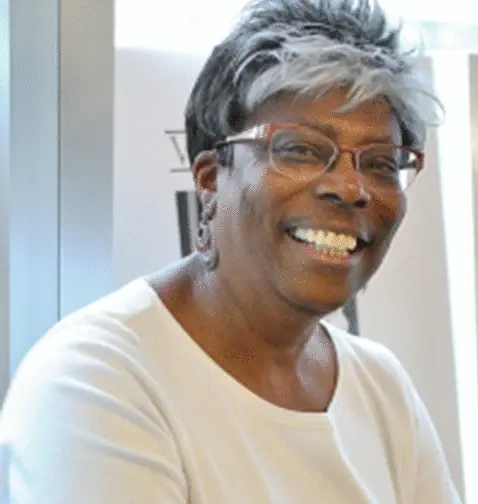
Carter in 2021

Carol A. Carter is an American microbiologist. She is Distinguished Professor in the Department of Microbiology and Immunology of the Renaissance School of Medicine at Stony Brook University, and member of the National Academy of Sciences.

== Early life and education ==
Carter grew up in Harlem with parents who stressed the importance of education, though they had only a seventh grade education. Carter's interest in becoming a scientist was encouraged by a grade school teacher who gave her a book about inventors. She earned her undergraduate degree from City College of New York and went on to earn a Ph.D. from Yale University.

Carter began graduate school in a bacteriophage laboratory before switching to animal virology, training under virologist and epidemiologist Francis L. Black. She discovered that measles virus has a nuclear phase of replication and that different strains of the virus cause acute measles versus subacute sclerosing panencephalitis. She was influenced by Matthew Scharff of Albert Einstein College of Medicine, who pioneered the use of HeLa cells for cultivating animal viruses. Carter did her postdoctoral work on double-stranded RNA viruses known as reoviruses in the laboratory of Aaron Shatkin. From her graduate work, Carter brought with her a trick for growing measles virus in culture: adding Kaopectate.

== Career ==
In 1975, Carter joined the faculty of SUNY Stony Brook as assistant professor under department chair Joseph Kates, who discovered polyA on mRNA. Carter continued working on reoviruses. After a sabbatical year studying the tumor virus SV40 in the laboratory of Carol Prives at Columbia University, she felt that the SV40 field was overcrowded, and sought a new field just at the time that HIV research was in its infancy.

With poliovirus expert Eckard Wimmer, Carter studied how HIV cleaves a precursor polyprotein to make infectious particles, a strategy also used by poliovirus.

Carter investigated the mechanisms of HIV capsid particle assembly. Mentoring biochemist Lorna Ehrlich, the two helped demonstrate that recombinant HIV-1 p24 capsid protein could oligomerize in vitro. Together with X-ray crystallographer Michael Rossmann, and NMR spectroscopists Mike Summers and Wes Sundquist, Carter solved the structure of the p24 capsid protein.

Using a yeast-two hybrid library screen, Carter's graduate student Beth Agresta identified Tsg (tumor susceptibility gene)101, a novel cellular protein that interacts with HIV-1 Gag protein. Carter and her trainees Fadila Bouamr, Traci LaGrassa, Lynn VerPlank, Jay Goff and Gisselle Medina established how Tsg101-Gag interactions lead HIV to escape degradation, undergo budding, and effect particle assembly and release. Carter identified how Tsg101 recruits calcium signaling machinery to endosomal sorting complexes required for transport (ESCRT), thus stabilizing viral assembly at the budding site. She continued working, with Jon Leis, to identify small molecules that target Tsg101 and other budding factors.

== Awards ==
Carter has received several awards:

- Stony Brook University Presidential Award for Promoting Diversity and Academic Excellence (2013)
- Suffolk County NY Martin Luther King, Jr Commission Public Service Award (2016)
- Long Island Innovator Award (2017)
- Election to the National Academy of Inventors (2020)
- David Derse Memorial Award in Retrovirology (2024)
- Wilbur Cross Medal (2026)

== Personal life ==
Carter enjoys walking on the beach and hosting gatherings for her husband, son and extended family.
