= T. K. Seung =

Korean American philosopher and literary critic (1930–2022)

Thomas Kaehao Seung 승계호
- Born: September 20, 1930 near the city Chongju, North Pyongan Province, Korea
- Died: February 19, 2022 (aged 91)
- Children: Sebastian Seung and children; K.J. Seung and children; Florence Kim and children

Philosophical work
- Era: 20th-century philosophy
- Region: Western Philosophy
- School: Platonism
- Main interests: Ethics; Political Philosophy; Philosophy of Law; Structuralism; Deconstruction; Hermeneutics
- Notable ideas: Cultural thematics; bedrock Platonism; the sovereign individual; Spinozistic epics

Korean name
- Hangul: 승계호
- Hanja: 承啓浩
- RR: Seung Gyeho
- MR: Sŭng Kyeho

T. K. Seung (Note: Originally romanized as T. K. Swing.) (September 20, 1930 – February 19, 2022) was a Korean-American philosopher and literary critic. His academic interests cut across diverse philosophical and literary subjects, including ethics, political philosophy, Continental philosophy, cultural hermeneutics, and literary criticism.

Seung was a professor of Philosophy, Government, and Law at the University of Texas at Austin College of Liberal Arts.

== Background ==
T. K. Seung was born on September 20, 1930, the eldest of three children, near the city of Chongju in North Pyongan Province. He attended Chongju Middle School, where he was exposed to Western-style education. In 1947, he escaped Chongju due to the influence of the People's Committee of North Korea, crossing the 38th parallel with a few friends. He settled in Seoul, where he studied at Seoul High School for three years. He attended Yonsei University for only one month before the Korean War broke out in June 1950, subsequently fleeing south to Busan ahead of the advancing North Korean army.

After the end of the Korean War, on the personal recommendation of President Syngman Rhee, Seung enrolled at Yale University on a full scholarship under the sponsorship of the American-Korean Foundation and resumed his undergraduate studies in 1954. As resident of Timothy Dwight College and a student in the Directed Studies program, he discovered the history of Western culture. He was introduced to the latest schools of thought such as existentialism, New Criticism, and other intellectual movements. At Yale he was mentored by a number of famous professors, including Thomas G. Bergin, Cleanth Brooks, Brand Blanshard, and F.S.C. Northrop. He graduated summa cum laude in 1958 with a bachelor's degree in philosophy and was elected to Phi Beta Kappa. He entered Yale Law School, but quit after one academic year, deciding instead to pursue doctoral studies in philosophy. While still a graduate student he wrote and published his first book, The Fragile Leaves of the Sibyl: Dante's Master Plan, which proposed a new, "trinitarian" interpretation of the Divine Comedy. His Ph.D. thesis was later published as a book, Kant's Transcendental Logic.

In 1965, he received his Ph.D. and also married Kwihwan Hahn, a graduate of Juilliard in piano performance. They have three children. His son, Sebastian Seung, is professor at the Princeton University Neuroscience Institute and Department of Computer Science. His second son, KJ Seung, is professor at the Harvard Medical School and the medical director at the Eugene Bell Foundation. His daughter, Florence Seung, is a psychiatrist. After teaching for a year at Fordham University, Seung joined the philosophy department of the University of Texas at Austin in 1966, where he was the Jesse H. Jones Professor in Liberal Arts, Professor of Philosophy, Government, and Law. In 1988, he was awarded the highest honor of Yale's graduate school alumni association—the Wilbur Cross Medal. Other winners have included John Silber, Richard Rorty, Robert Putnam, Robert Dahl, Bartlett Giamatti, and Stanley Fish.

In his career at the University of Texas at Austin, Seung published ten monographs, including books on Dante, Kant, Structuralism, Hermeneutics, Rawls, Plato, Nietzsche, Wagner, and Goethe. In the course of writing these books, he developed a methodology he called "cultural thematics," which he described "a cultural tradition" in which can be found "a constant interplay of existential themes or motifs, in analogy to a dramatic production or a musical composition." Seung emphasizes that "human existence is always inextricably culture-bound." Contrary to Heidegger, he insists, "my approach in cultural thematics openly stands on the historicist premise that every culture is the embodiment of an existential structure unique to itself" (Cultural Thematics, pp. x-xi). He would use this approach not only to interpret philosophical traditions of particular ages, such as the late Medieval Dante and Boccaccio, and later the Spinozistic German epics of the 19th century, but also to traditions that sometimes spanned centuries, such as the periodic recurrence of Platonic ideas in Kant and Rawls.

Seung taught broadly at the University of Texas, including for many years in its Plan II program. He was also a dissertation supervisor for David Lay Williams and Michael Locke McLendon.

Seung died on February 19, 2022, at the age of 91.

== Kant research ==
Seung was the author of three books about the German philosopher Immanuel Kant written over four decades. Seung's first book on Kant is titled Kant's Transcendental Logic (New Haven: Yale University Press, 1969) addresses issues raised in Kant's First Critique. His second book about Kant is Kant's Platonic Revolution in Moral and Political Philosophy (Baltimore: The Johns Hopkins University Press, 1994) in which Seung criticizes Kant on the lack of consistency between the First Critique and the Second Critique by Kant due to ambiguities between Kant's ontological constructivism and his eidetic constructivism. Seung's last book on Kant is a primer about studying Kant for students titled: Kant: A Guide for the Perplexed (London: Continuum, 2007).

== Selected works ==
Books

The Fragile Leaves of the Sibyl: Dante's Master Plan (Westminster, MD: Newman Press, 1962).

Kant's Transcendental Logic (New Haven: Yale University Press, 1969).

Cultural Thematics: The Formation of the Faustian Ethos (New Haven: Yale University Press, 1976).

Semiotics and Thematics in Hermeneutics (New York: Columbia University Press, 1982).

Structuralism and Hermeneutics (New York: Columbia University Press, 1982).

Intuition and Construction: The Foundation of Normative Theory (New Haven: Yale University Press, 1993).

Kant's Platonic Revolution in Moral and Political Philosophy (Baltimore: The Johns Hopkins University Press, 1994).

Plato Rediscovered: Human Value and Social Order (Lanham, MD: Rowman & Littlefield, 1996).

Nietzsche's Epic of the Soul: Thus Spoke Zarathustra (Lanham, MD: Lexington Books, 2005).

Goethe, Nietzsche, and Wagner: Their Spinozan Epics of Love and Power (Lanham, MD: Lexington Books, 2006).

Kant: A Guide for the Perplexed (London: Continuum, 2007).

The Cultural Background of Western Philosophy (Seoul: Korean Academic Research Council, 2007).

Articles

"Plural Values and Indeterminate Rankings," with Daniel Bonevac, in Ethics 799 (1992)

"Virtues and Values: A Platonic Account," in Social Theory and Practice 207 (1991)

"Kant's Conception of the Categories," in Review of Metaphysics 107 (1989)

"Conflict in Practical Reasoning," with Daniel Bonevac, Philosophical Studies 315: 53 (1988)

"Literary Function and Historical Context," in Philosophy and Literature 33: 4 (1980)

"Thematic Dialectic: A Revision of Hegelian Dialectic," in International Philosophical Quarterly 417: 20 (1980)

"The Epic Character of the Divina Commedia and the Function of Dante's Three Guides," in Italica 352: 56 (1979)

"Semantic Context and Textual Meaning," in Journal of Literary Semantics, 8:2 (1979)

Contributions

"Defeasible Reasoning and Moral Dilemmas," with Rob Koons, in Defeasible Deontic Logic, edited by Donald Nute (Springer, 1997)

"The Metaphysics of the Commedia," in The Divine Comedy and the Encyclopedia of Arts and Sciences, edited by G. Di Scipio and A. Scaglione (Amsterdam, Philadelphia: John Benjamins Publishing, 1988)

"Kant," in The Encyclopedia of Religion, edited by Mircea Eliade (New York: Free Press, 1987)

"The Philosophical Tradition in Korea," in Tae Kwon Do Free Fighting, edited by Gaeshik Kim (Seoul: Nanam Publications, 1985)

"Bonaventura's Figural Exemplarism in Dante," in Italian Literature: Roots and Branches: Essays in honor of Thomas G. Bergin, edited by G. Rimanelli and K. Atchity (New Haven: Yale University Press, 1976)
