= Jennifer L. Kelsey =

American epidemiologist (1942–2021)

Jennifer L. Kelsey (1942 – October 13, 2021) was an American epidemiologist. She was Professor Emerita at Stanford University School of Medicine, where she had previously been Chief of the Division of Epidemiology and Professor of Health Research and Policy. She earned a master's degree in public health at Yale University in 1966, and completed her PhD in epidemiology there three years later. Her publications included a textbook, Methods in Observational Epidemiology, a monograph, Epidemiology of Musculoskeletal Disorders, and chapters, journal articles, and papers on musculoskeletal disorders, gynecology, geriatrics, and related topics. She was an honorary fellow of the American College of Epidemiology, and was awarded the John Snow Award in Epidemiology (1991) and the Wilbur Cross Medal (1995), among other honors.

Kelsey died on October 13, 2021, aged 79, in Connecticut from complications following a stroke.
