= Nature Cell Biology =

- Discipline: Cell biology
- Language: English
- Edited by: Christina Kary, PhD

Publication details
- History: 1999–present
- Publisher: Nature Portfolio
- Frequency: Monthly
- Open access: Hybrid
- Impact factor: 19.5 (2024)

Standard abbreviations
- ISO 4: Nat. Cell Biol.

Indexing
- CODEN: NCBIFN
- ISSN: 1465-7392 (print); 1476-4679 (web)
- LCCN: sn99031593
- OCLC no.: 41423161

Links
- Journal homepage; Online archive

Nature Cell Biology is a monthly peer-reviewed scientific journal published by Nature Portfolio. It was established in 1999. The founding editor was Annette Thomas. The current editor-in-chief is Christina Kary.

According to the Nature Cell Biology, the journal has a 2023 impact factor of 26.6.

== Controversies ==
In May 2026, Geng Hongwei, a Chinese science popularizer and academic fraud watchdog blogger, revealed that two papers published in Nature Cell Biology, one by the research team led by Kang Tiebang, Deputy Director of the Experimental Research Department at the Sun Yat-sen University Cancer Center, and the other by the team led by Kuang Dongming, Vice Dean of the School of Life Sciences at Sun Yat-sen University, had contained irregularities in their data. Sun Yat-sen University then launched investigations and announced that the papers had indeed involved academic misconduct. The university removed Kang Tiebang from his relevant positions and dismissed Kuang Dongming from his post as vice dean. It also imposed disciplinary measures, including demotion, suspension of student recruitment, and orders to issue corrections or retract the papers.
