= John Aber =

American ecologist

- Born: Los Angeles, California
- Education: Yale University
- Known for: Ecosystem Analysis, Nitrogen Saturation, Restoration ecology
- Scientific career
- Fields: Ecology, Environmental science
- Workplaces: University of New Hampshire

John D. Aber is University Professor Emeritus of Natural Resources & the Environment at the University of New Hampshire, and was also for many years affiliated with the Institute for the Study of Earth, Oceans, and Space at UNH. His fields of study included Ecosystem Analysis and Modeling, Global Change, Acid Rain, Nitrogen Deposition and Sustainable Agriculture.

== Career ==
Aber received a Bachelor's degree in engineering and applied science (computer science) from Yale University in 1971, and Master's and Ph.D. degrees in 1973 and 1976 in Forest Ecosystem Analysis from the Yale School of Forestry and Environmental Studies (now the School of the Environment). His thesis work was performed as part of the Hubbard Brook Ecosystem Study, with which he maintained an affiliation for many years. He was a professor at the University of Virginia (1977–78), and the University of Wisconsin-Madison (1979–1987), before moving to the University of New Hampshire in 1987. Aber served in administration at UNH as provost and vice president of academic affairs (2009–2013) and Vice President for Research and Public Service (2003–2007). In 1996, he was a Charles Bullard Fellow at Harvard University.

Aber was selected in 2012 as one of four recipients of the Wilbur Cross Medal by the Yale Alumni Association. The medal celebrates a lifetime of academic achievement. He was also named a Distinguished Alumnus of the Yale School of Forestry and Environmental Studies in 2003. At the University of New Hampshire, Aber received the Distinguished Professor Award in 2003 and was named one of 4 University Professors in 2009. In 2017, he received the USEPA Region 1 Lifetime Merit Award.

== Research area ==
Most of Aber's research career focused on the carbon, nitrogen and water dynamics of forested ecosystems as impacted by major sources of pollution, including acid rain and ozone, and the impact of a changing climate. He was a principal investigator at the NSF Long-term Ecological Research sites at Hubbard Brook in New Hampshire, and at the Harvard Forest in central Massachusetts. He used a combination of field measurements, advanced remote sensing techniques and computer modeling to predict the future of forests, especially in the Eastern U.S. and Ireland. Working with many close colleagues and graduate students, Aber was engaged in 56 funded projects over a 40-year period with support provided primarily by NASA, the National Science Foundation and the USEPA.

Aber also worked with colleagues at the Harvard Forest on the Wildlands and Woodlands Project focused on maintaining 70% of the New England landscape in forest cover, and with colleagues at UNH on defining just what it means to be a sustainable university. While at the University of Wisconsin-Madison, Aber worked with William Jordan and others at the university's Arboretum to develop a scientific approach to restoration ecology. He was for a short while Director of a Center for Restoration Ecology at the Arboretum.

Aber's final funded project applied concepts learned from four decades of forest research to sustainable management of an agroecosystem located at New Hampshire's Organic Dairy Research Farm. The project focused on reducing dependence on external sources of energy and materials to help close the carbon and nutrient cycles on the farm.

Aber retired from UNH in May 2021 and is pursuing a life-long interest in the writing of popular science. He has recently published a book through Yale University Press, and continues to post essays to the Substack site listed below. Both are titled Less Heat More Light and focus on providing accessible and hopefully interesting presentations on the science of weather, climate and climate change.

== Bibliography ==
1. Restoration Ecology: A Synthetic Approach to Ecological Research, William R. Jordan, III (Editor), Michael E. Gilpin (Editor), John A. Aber (editor), 1987, Cambridge University Press
2. Terrestrial Ecosystems (2nd Edition), John D. Aber, Jerry M. Melillo, March 9, 2001, Academic Press First Edition 1991, Saunders College Publishing
3. Forests in Time: The Environmental Consequences of 1,000 Years of Change in New England, David R. Foster (Editor), John D. Aber (Editor), 10, March, 2004, Yale University Press
4. The Sustainable Learning Community: One University's Journey to the Future, John Aber (Editor), Tom Kelly (Editor), Bruce Mallory (Editor), 2009, University Press of New England
5. Wildlands and Woodlands: A Vision for the New England Landscape by David R. Foster, John D. Aber (Contributor), Elizabeth A. Colburn (Contributor), Charles T. Driscoll (Contributor), Malcolm L. Hunter Jr. (Contributor), Lloyd C. Irland (Contributor), Aaron M. Ellison (Contributor), William S. Keeton (Contributor) ... , September 1, 2010, Harvard University Forest
6. The Agroecosystem Project at the Organic Dairy Research Farm, University of New Hampshire: Summary of Results and Proposals for Applications. Aber, J.D., M.M. Smith, A.M. Leach, W.H. McDowell, M.D. Shattuck, N.A. Williamson, D.M. Hoffman and J.M. Davis. 2020. University of New Hampshire, Durham, NH, USA - Available through ResearchGate.
7. Less Heat More Light: A Guided Tour of Weather, Climate and Climate Change, Aber, J.D., Yale University Press, 2023
8. Less Heat More Light: Essays on Weather, Climate and Climate Change. https://lessheatmorelight.substack.com/

Aber has authored or co-authored more than 200 scientific publications. See link to Google Scholar below.
