= Geng Hongwei =

Chinese science communicator

Geng Hongwei (Chinese: 耿洪伟), better known as Classmate Geng (Chinese: 耿同学), is a Chinese science communicator and academic fraud investigator who is primarily active on platforms such as Bilibili and Douyin (the Chinese version of TikTok). He earned both his bachelor's and master's degrees in biology from Jilin University before pursuing a Ph.D. at Beihang University (formerly Beijing University of Aeronautics and Astronautics), which he left in 2025 without completing the degree. Beginning in April 2026, he publicly challenged a series of papers published by scholars from multiple Chinese universities in Nature and its affiliated journals under Springer Nature, such as Nature Cell Biology, alleging that they contained fabricated data. His investigations drew widespread public attention to issues of research integrity and academic oversight in Chinese higher education.
