= Robert Gooding-Williams =

American philosopher

- Born: 1953 (age 73); Cleveland, Ohio
- Awards: American Academy of Arts and Sciences (2018); Guggenheim Fellowship (2020); Wilbur Cross Medal (2023)

Education
- Education: Yale University (BA, PhD)
- Thesis: Recurrence, Parody, and Politics in the Philosophy of Friedrich Nietzsche (1982)
- Doctoral advisor: George A. Schrader; Heinrich von Staden

Philosophical work
- Era: Contemporary philosophy
- Region: Western philosophy
- School: Continental philosophy
- Institutions: Yale University; Columbia University; University of Chicago; Northwestern University; Amherst College; Simmons College
- Main interests: Social philosophy, political philosophy, African-American philosophy, existentialism, aesthetics

Robert Gooding-Williams (born 1954) is an American philosopher and the Brooks and Suzanne Ragen Professor of Philosophy at Yale University. He was previously M. Moran Weston/Black Alumni Council Professor of African-American Studies and Professor of Philosophy at Columbia University. He was the founding director of Columbia's Center for Race, Philosophy, and Social Justice. He specializes in philosophy of race and Continental philosophy, especially Nietzsche.

== Education and career ==
Gooding-Williams earned a B.A. (1975) and Ph.D. (1982) in philosophy from Yale University. He taught first at Amherst College, where he became professor of black studies and George Lyman Crosby 1896 professor of philosophy. He became professor of philosophy at Northwestern University, where he taught for seven years and directed Northwestern's Alice Berline Kaplan Center for the Humanities. He joined the department of political science at the University of Chicago in 2006 and was named Ralph and Mary Otis Isham Professor in 2007. He joined the Columbia faculty in 2014, and left in 2024 to go to Yale.

He was elected a Fellow of the American Academy of Arts and Sciences in 2018.

== Books ==
- Zarathustra's Dionysian Modernism (Stanford University Press, 2001)
- Look, A Negro! Philosophical Essays on Race, Culture, and Politics (Routledge, 2005)
- In The Shadow of Du Bois: Afro-Modern Political Thought in America (Harvard University Press, 2009)
