= Thomas G. Bergin =

American scholar of Italian literature

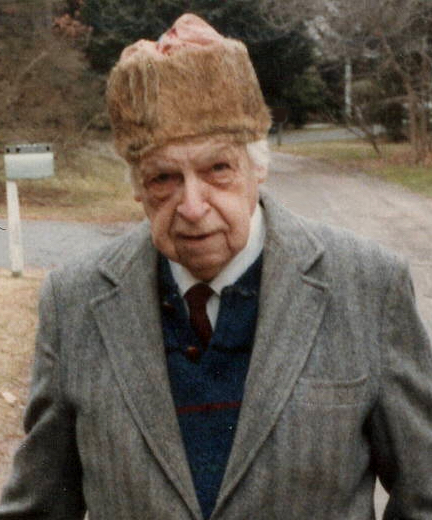
- Born: Thomas Goddard Bergin; November 17, 1904; New Haven, Connecticut
- Died: October 30, 1987 (aged 82); Madison, Connecticut
- Education: Yale University
- Occupations: Translator; author; teacher; editor
- Spouse: Florence Bullen
- Writing career
- Notable work: La Divina Commedia translation
- Notable awards: Order of the British Empire, Bronze Star

Thomas Goddard Bergin OBE (November 17, 1904 – October 30, 1987) was an American scholar of Italian literature, who was "noted particularly for his research on Dante's Divine Comedy and for its translation". He was the Sterling Professor of Romance Languages at Yale University, and Master of Timothy Dwight College. He is the first poet to have his words launched into outer space to orbit the Earth.

== Author, translator, editor ==
He is recognized as an authority on Dante, Boccaccio, Petrarch, and the Provençal troubadours, as well as modern Italian writers, including Alberto Moravia, Salvatore Quasimodo, Giovanni Verga, and Giambattista Vico. Bartlett Giamatti referred to him as the “grand statesman of Italian scholarship in America.”

Among his translations are Dante's Divine Comedy (1948), which was published in three-volumes with illustrations by Leonard Baskin, Niccolò Machiavelli's The Prince (1947) and Giambattista Vico's New Science (1946) with Max Fisch.

He published scholarly texts and monographs on authors and the literature of renaissance Italy, France, Spain and Provençal. His biography of the Italian author Boccaccio (1981) was considered a “notable book” of the year by the New York Times, and was a finalist in 1981 for the National Book Critics Circle Award.

Biography of Giovanni Boccaccio

He edited The Taming of the Shrew for The Yale Shakespeare, and states in the introduction that his “basic principle was fidelity to the text” of the First Folio of 1623. This in part involved restoring many original wordings and punctuation that long editorial tradition had permitted to be altered.

He was prolific; the bibliography of his works in Italian Literature: Roots and Branches (1976), lists thirty-seven books, fifteen contributions to books, fifty articles in periodicals, and almost 500 book reviews.

His book Dante (1965) was published during the 700th anniversary year of the birth of the Italian poet, a busy year for Bergin, during which he created a conference at Yale on Dante, he was the editor of the conference papers, which were published in book form as From Time to Eternity, and he travelled extensively lecturing on Dante.

Julius A. Molinaro, writing in "Forum Italicum", the journal of Italian studies, states that there must be few "who are not acquainted with some aspect of his work, for it touches many fields ranging ... from the Provencal troubadours to translations of contemporary Italian poetry. Between these limits are a Dante concordance and invaluable books on Dante, Petrarch and Vico."

== The Divine Comedy ==
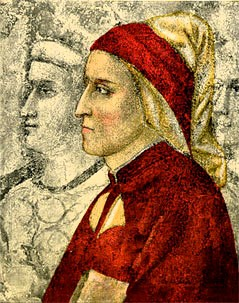
Dante Alighieri painted by his contemporary Giotto

Thomas G. Bergin writes that The Divine Comedy "is everything: a personal confession, a vast love lyric, an encyclopedia of the knowledge of the Middle Ages ... and of course quite simply an absorbing narrative." The Divine Comedy is made up of 14,233 lines, divided into three parts; Inferno, Purgatorio and Paradiso. Thomas G. Bergin's English translation casts Dante's poem into blank verse. It begins with these lines:

Nel mezzo del cammin di nostra vita
mi ritrovai per una selva oscura,
ché la diritta via era smarrita.
Ahi quanto a dir qual era è cosa dura
esta selva selvaggia e aspra e forte
che nel pensier rinova la paura!

— Inferno Canto I, lines 1-6
Translation:

Midway along the journey of our life
I found myself within a gloomy wood
For the right pathway had been lost to view.
So hard it is its aspect to define,
This savage, harsh, and fearsome wilderness,
That fear rekindles with the memory.

— Translated by Thomas G. Bergin

== Yale ==
The chapter written by Bergin in the book, My Harvard, My Yale, recounts how from an early age, he had a deep and abiding appreciation for Yale University. He was born in New Haven, not far from the university, he attended public high school, and was awarded the only scholarship that was given each year by the town to a local boy to attend Yale. He entered Yale as an undergraduate in 1921, just as the twenties were beginning to roar. He found there an invigorating academic environment, but also a social stratification that kept the students from more privileged backgrounds apart from the others.

Thomas G. Bergin wanted to make his mark at Yale, and recognized that academic achievement was a way open to him. He describes how he "came to enjoy learning" and by his senior year, he says, "it became for me an unadulterated rapture".

At this point—twenty years old and approaching graduation— an opportunity was presented to him, that would be his life's journey, and it would begin with a required sojourn in Florence, Dante's home. But there was a parental figure who was determined to prevent him from taking this first step. The story of his escape from home, up until the gangplanks are drawn up and the ship sets sail, as he relates it in the essay, "Endings and Beginnings", is a tale of suspense.

He earned his B.A. from Yale in 1925, traveled to Italy to study and live, and then returned to Yale to earn a Ph.D. in romance languages in 1929. He taught at Yale College as a teacher of Italian from 1925 until 1930. In 1949, he became head of Yale's Spanish and Italian Department, and the Benjamin Barge Professor of Romance Languages and Literature.

When Bergin returned to Yale after the war, he "could see at once how greatly the college system had improved life under the elms." The college system that was introduced in the 1930s had the effect of solving the problem of social stratification by stirring up the social order and getting students from all backgrounds and experiences to live, study and be together—a richer social life became available to everyone. Another result was that the system of fraternities diminished. Thomas G. Bergin was appointed master of Timothy Dwight College in 1953. As Master, he presided over a community of young scholars who lived in the college.

As Master, he also hosted The Timothy Dwight Chubb Fellowship visits of notable people from various walks of life, including the prime minister of the United Kingdom from 1945 to 1951 Clement Attlee, conservative presidential candidate of 1964 Barry Goldwater, President Harry Truman, Adlai Stevenson, actor Fredric March, novelist Iris Murdoch, and future president Ronald Reagan.

When the visit by the conservative Californian candidate, Ronald Reagan, was announced, it stirred up controversy in the political atmosphere of 1967— there were those who wanted the invitation withdrawn.

William F. Buckley, Jr., who is described as a "life long friend" of Bergin, in spite of each man being on opposite ends of the political spectrum, weighed in on the controversy in his syndicated newspaper column. Buckley, writing with what the Yale Daily News described as "tongue-in-cheek" referred to Bergin as "a scholar aesthete of obstinate liberalism." Bergin responded by saying “I always enjoy Buckley’s prose. For once I find it difficult to quarrel with him.” Buckley was further inspired to imagine Bergin "lamenting the furor over his invitation to Reagan" with a quote from the Divine Comedy: “I cannot well report how I entered it, so full was I of slumber at that moment when I abandoned the true way.”

Bergin had a reputation as an impressive speaker with a striking wit. A few of the speeches that he gave as Master, along with other writings and notes posted on the bulletin board, were gathered together and published in the book Master Pieces, which was edited by Bartlett Giamatti and T. K. Seung.

The Game, the Harvard-Yale Football Rivalry by Thomas G. Bergin

In 1957 he became the Sterling Professor of Romance Languages and Literature, and when he retired in 1973 he became Sterling Professor Emeritus.

He was an unofficial historian of Yale in his book on Yale football, Gridiron Glory (1978), and in his column, "Time and Change", which was published regularly for twenty years in the Yale Alumni Magazine. He wrote of the Harvard/Yale football rivalry in his book The Game (1984).

In 1989, Yale established the Thomas Bergin scholarships for Italian majors, and the dining room of Timothy Dwight College was named in his honor.

== World War II ==
During the war, Major Bergin was assigned to the headquarters of the Allied Control Commission in Italy, where he served as director of public relations from 1943 to 1946. For his service during the war, Bergin was decorated with the Bronze Star, the Order of Civil Merit and the Order of Saints Maurice and Lazarus and Ordine della Corona d'Italia from Italy, and the Order of the British Empire.

He was stationed in the hills that overlooked the Bay of Naples and the Isle of Capri where the sun would set every night. It was a time when the allied forces had arrived and were battling the enemy, from hill to hill, from the south to the north, leaving behind a bruised and traumatized country. His wartime experiences are expressed in verse in his book, Parco Grifeo.

== Poet ==
The New York Times referred to him as “a renowned Dante scholar and a wry poet in his own right”. His poems are published in books, magazines and quarterlies.

His poem, "Space Prober", became, on November 15, 1961, the first poem sent to orbit in outer space. The poem was inscribed on an instrument panel, and launched on a Transit Research and Attitude Control (TRAAC) Satellite, where it continues to orbit the Earth at an altitude of 600 miles, and is expected to continue orbiting for the next 800 years.

== Personal life ==
Thomas G. Bergin, or "TGB" as he was sometimes known, was born in New Haven, Connecticut, on November 17, 1904, a child of Thomas Joseph Bergin and Irvinea Jane Frances Goddard Bergin. Thomas Joseph Bergin graduated from Yale in 1896. Thomas G. Bergin attended New Haven High School, and then Yale, where he received a B.A. in 1925 and a Ph.D. in romance languages in 1929. He married Florence Bullen of Wallasey, England on December 30, 1929.

He taught at Yale College from 1925 until 1930, and was a professor of Spanish and Italian at Flora Stone Mather College of Western Reserve University from 1930 to 1935. He then moved to Albany and taught romance languages at the New York State Teachers College.

He then went on to Cornell University from 1941 to 1948 where he was a professor of romance languages.

In 1943, he received an appointment to teach at the United States School of Military Government at Charlottesville, Virginia.

Thomas G. Bergin died on October 30, 1987, age 82, at home in Madison, Connecticut. He was survived by his wife, who has since died; two daughters, Winifred Hart, of Lexington, Virginia and costume designer Jennifer von Mayrhauser of New York; six grandchildren, and eight great-grandchildren.

== Honors ==
Thomas G. Bergin's honors include the Dante and Petrarch Medals, the Yale Medal, the Wilbur Cross Medal, Honorary Officer of the Order of the British Empire, and the Bronze Star for his military service to his country during the war. In recognition of his many contributions to Italian studies, the Italian government made him Commander of the Order of Civil Merit in 1969. He received honorary degrees from Hofstra College in 1958, Fairfield University in 1965, and the State University of New York at Binghamton in 1984. He was awarded the Yale College DeVane Medal in 1975.

The Thomas G. Bergin Cup is given "in appreciation of Thomas G. Bergin, by the Class of 1968. It is awarded each year to a member of the senior class for outstanding character, wit and scholarship in the humanities".

He was a member of the American Association of Teachers of Italian (president in 1947), the Medieval Academy of America, the Dante Society of America, the American Association of University Professors (president of the Yale chapter from 1951 to 1952), and PEN International.

== Books ==
- Giovanni Verga (1931)
- Modern Italian Short Stories (1938), editor
- Luciano Zuccoli: ritratto umbertino (1940)
- Anthology of the Provençal Troubadours (1973), editor, with Raymond Thompson Hill
- Three French Plays (1941), editor with R.T. Hill
- Spanish Grammar (1943) textbook with G. Dale
- The Autobiography of Giambattista Vico, by Vico (1944), translator with Max Fisch
- Parco Grifeo (1946), verse wartime writings
- The Prince, Machiavelli (1947), translator and editor
- Dante's "Inferno" (1948) translator
- Dante's "Purgatorio" (1953) translator
- Dante's "Paradiso" (1954) translator
- Divine Comedy (1955) translator
- The Poems of William of Poitou (1955), translator
- Yale Shakespeare The Complete Works, The Taming of the Shrew (1954) editor
- The Divine Comedy, by Dante Alighieri (1955), translator and editor
- Translations from Petrarch (1955), editor, and translator with others
- Procul Este a Gramine (1960)
- Almanac for Academics (1960)
- The New Science of Giambattista Vico, by Vico (1961), translator with Max Fisch
- Bertran de Born (1964) translator, editor
- Master Pieces (1964) edited by T. K. Seung and A. Bartlett Giamatti
- Italian Sampler (1964) translator, editor
- Dante (1965)
- Approach to Dante (1965)
- The Sonnets of Petrarch (1965) translator, editor
- Concordance to the Divine Comedy (1965) editor with E. H. Wilkins, et al
- Sonnets and Odes of Petrarch (1966) translator, editor
- Perspective on the Divine Comedy (1967)
- From Time to Eternity (1967) editor
- A Diversity of Dante (1969)
- The Divine Comedy (1969) translator, rev. trans.
- Dante: His Life, His Times, His Works (1970) translator, editor
- Cervantes: His Life, His Times, His Works (1970) translator, editor
- Petrarch (1970)
- Dante's Divine Comedy (1971)
- On Sepulchres (1971), translator and editor
- Anthology of the Provençal Troubadours (1973), editor, along with Raymond Thompson Hill
- Bucolicum Carmen, by Petrarch (1974), translator and editor
- Italian Literature, Roots and Branches (1976) ed. Kenneth Atchity Giose Rimanelli
- Africa (1977) translator with Alice S. Wilson
- Gridiron Glory (1978)
- Boccaccio (1981)
- My Harvard My Yale (1982) ed. Diana Dubois, TGB contributing author
- Under Scorpio (1982)
- Yale's Residential Colleges; the First Fifty Years (1982)
- The Game: The Harvard-Yale Football Rivalry, 1875-1983 (1984)
- Old Provençal Primer (1984) co-author with Nathaniel B. Smith
- Encyclopedia of the Renaissance (1987) co-author with Jennifer Speake
