= Russell G. Hamilton =

American author and academic (1934–2016)

- Born: 1934; New Haven, Connecticut, United States
- Died: February 27, 2016 (aged 81–82); Minnesota, United States
- Occupations: Academic, author
- Years active: 1975–2016

Russell G. Hamilton (born 1934, in New Haven, Connecticut – died February 27, 2016, in Minnesota) was an American author specialised in history and literature. He was a professor emeritus of Spanish and Portuguese and the first African-American to serve as a dean at Vanderbilt University in Nashville, Tennessee. He is the author of Voices from an Empire: A History of Afro-Portuguese Literature, which was first published in 1975 and Literatura Africana, Literatura Necessária.

== Biography ==
Hamilton was born in New Haven, Connecticut, United States and grew up in New England. His father was a chemical operator and his mother operated as a secretary, according to Vanderbilt University, Hamilton told a reporter from a Nashville Banner in 1985 that he wanted to be a professor. He obtained his bachelor's degree from the University of Connecticut, and earned his master's from the University of Wisconsin-Madison, he studied in Brazil for two years before his PhD work completion at Yale University. Prior his graduation, Hamilton was hired as a deputy professor by the University of Minnesota, where he additionally served as a professor and an Associate Dean for Faculty. After his 20-year service at the University of Minnesota, he joined the Vanderbilt Community where he served as Dean of the Graduate School. During his tenure as a dean, the university progressed in conscripting African American doctoral students and upheld them through the accomplishment of their degrees. In 1990s, Hamilton led the university's Committee for Recruitment and Retention of Minority Faculty. Hamilton also headed the Graduate School as Dean for Graduate Studies and Research from 1984 to 2000. He continued on faculty as a professor of Spanish and Portuguese and was accorded an emeritus status in 2002, before his retirement in 2005. Hamilton also served as a Fulbright research fellow in Portugal and Africa. Nicholas S. Zeppos, former chancellor of Vanderbilt University described him as a true pioneer.

== Awards and recognitions ==
- Mary Cady Tew Prize for the most promising doctoral student in Romance languages at Yale University.
- The Wilbur Lucius Cross Medal for outstanding graduate alumni of Yale University
- The Louise Williams Educational Service Award

== Works ==
=== Books ===
- Hamilton, Russell G. (1975). Voices from an Empire: A History of Afro-Portuguese Literature. Minneapolis: Minnesota Monographs in the Humanities. ISBN 0816607451.
- Hamilton, Russel G. (1984). Literatura Africana, Literatura Necessária: Moçambique, Cabo Verde, Guiné-Bisau, Sāo Tomé e Príncipe. Lisboa: Edições 70.

=== Articles & book chapters ===
- "Tribute to Gerald M. Moser." Research in African Literatures, Vol. 38, No. 1, Lusophone African and Afro-Brazilian Literatures (Spring 2007), pp. 1–4.
- "Gabriela Meets Olodum: Paradoxes of Hybridity, Racial Identity, and Black Consciousness in Contemporary Brazil." 2007. Research in African Literatures, Vol. 38, No. 1, Lusophone African and Afro-Brazilian Literatures (Spring 2007), pp. 181–193.
- "Conceição Lima, Poet of São Tomé e Príncipe." Research in African Literatures, Vol. 38, No. 1, Lusophone African and Afro-Brazilian Literatures (Spring 2007), pp. 194–198.
- "Contemporary Cape Verdean Literature." Transition, No. 103, Cabo Verde (2010), pp. 26–35.
- "European Transplants, Amerindian In-laws, African Settlers, Brazilian Creoles: A Unique Colonial and Postcolonial Condition in Latin America." Coloniality at Large. 2008. Duke University Press.
