= Dorceta Taylor =

American environmentalist

Dorceta E. Taylor
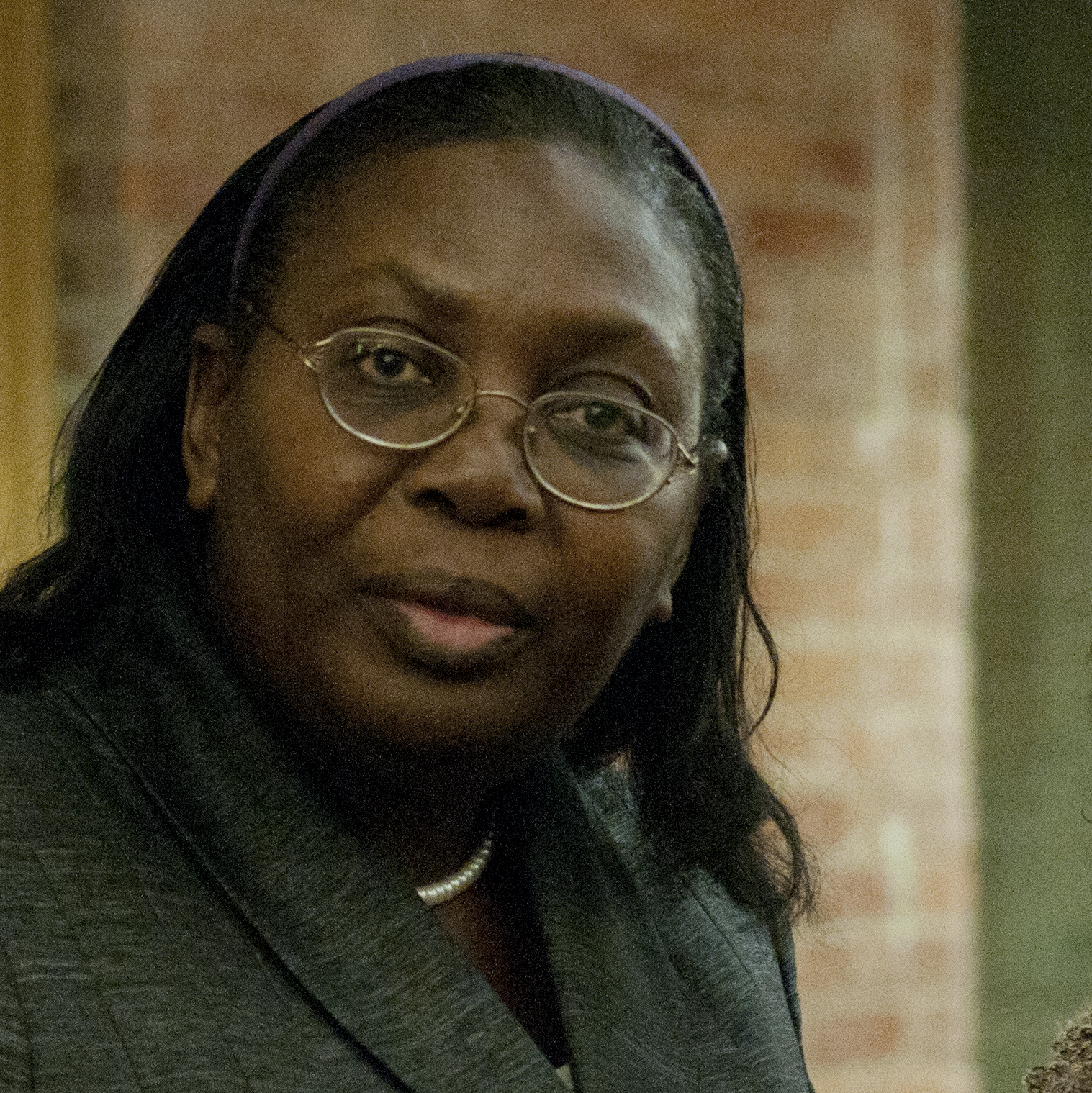
- Born: Dorceta E. Taylor; 1957 (age 68–69); Jamaica
- Occupations: Environmental sociologist and historian

Academic background
- Education: Yale University, Northeastern Illinois University

Academic work
- Institutions: Yale School of the Environment, University of Michigan School for Environment and Sustainability
- Main interests: Conservation, diversity in environmental organizations, environmental justice, and environmental racism
- Notable works: People and the Environment in American Cities, 1600s-1900s, Toxic Communities, The Rise of the American Conservation Movement
- Notable ideas: Environmental privilege

Dorceta E. Taylor is an American environmental sociologist known for her work on both environmental justice and racism in the environmental movement. She is the senior associate dean of diversity, equity, and inclusion at Yale School of the Environment, as well as a professor of environmental justice. Prior to this, she was the director of diversity, equity, and inclusion at the University of Michigan's School of Environment and Sustainability (SEAS), where she also served as the James E. Crowfoot Collegiate Professor of Environmental Justice. Taylor's research has ranged over environmental history, environmental justice, environmental policy, leisure and recreation, gender and development, urban affairs, race relations, collective action and social movements, green jobs, diversity in the environmental field, food insecurity, and urban agriculture.

A scholar of environmental justice, Taylor's work has garnered numerous awards. Her 2009 book, The Environment and the People in American Cities: 1600s-1900s, was the first history of environmental injustice in America. Her 2014 book Toxic Communities has been hailed as a "standard-bearer" for environmental justice scholarship. Her book, The Rise of the American Conservation Movement is a "sweeping social history" that challenges narrative of environmental history and inspires readers to "reconsider nearly everything".

== Early life and education ==
Taylor was born and raised in rural Jamaica. She earned a bachelor's of arts in Environmental Studies and Biology (with honors) from Northeastern Illinois University in Chicago in 1983. She obtained a master's of forest science from Yale University in 1985. She followed with a Master of Arts and a Master of Philosophy in 1988. She received a joint doctoral degree in sociology and forestry and environmental studies from the School of Forestry and the Department of Sociology at Yale University 1991. She was the first African American woman to earn a doctoral degree from Yale School of Forestry & Environmental Studies.

== Academic career ==
Taylor received a National Science Foundation Minority Post-doctoral Fellowship in 1991 to study ethnic minority environmental activism in Britain. She affiliated with the University College of London's Department of Geography while she conducted her research. In 1992 she obtained a Ford Foundation/Rockefeller Foundation Poverty and the Underclass Post-doctoral Fellowship at the University of Michigan. The appointment was jointly held between the Ford School of Public Policy and the School of Social Work.

In 2010, she won the Allan Schnaiberg Outstanding Publication Award for the book, Environment and the People in American Cities, 1600s-1900s: Disorder, Inequality, and Social Change (Duke University Press, 2009). Taylor was the chair of the Environment and Technology Section of the American Sociological Association from 2012 to 2013.

In 2012, Taylor became the principal investigator of a five-year United States Department of Agriculture grant to study racial and class disparities in food access in the state of Michigan.

In 2014, she was celebrated by the city of San Francisco as one of 29 black environmentalists who have made "real and lasting change".

In 2015, Taylor became the James E. Crowfoot Collegiate Professor of Environmental Justice and the Director of Diversity, Equity, and Inclusion at the University of Michigan's School for Environment and Sustainability (SEAS).

In 2018, she was celebrated by a wide range of the world's most prominent environmental organizations. She was awarded the Women in Conservation Rachel Carson Award from the National Audubon Society, the Freudenburg Lifetime Achievement Award from the Association of Environmental Science and Studies, the National Science Foundation's Presidential Award for Excellence in Science, Mathematics & Engineering, Mentoring (PAESMEM), the University of Michigan Distinguished Faculty Achievement Award, and the President's Award from the Detroit Audubon Society.

On July 1, 2020, Taylor joined the Yale School of Forestry and Environmental Studies as a full professor.

In 2021, she became the first senior associate dean of Diversity, Equity, and Inclusion at Yale School of the Environment.

== Work on diversity in environmental organizations ==
Taylor's work on racial exclusion in the environmental movement began in 1989, with her article "Blacks and the Environment: Toward an Explanation of the Concern and Action Gap between Blacks and Whites", and she authored numerous articles on the subject in the early 1990s. In 2014, she authored a groundbreaking report on diversity in environmental organizations. The report's findings, that environmental organizations were failing to represent the diverse American population in their leadership, aroused a firestorm of controversy. The report was commissioned by the Green 2.0 diversity initiative, which continues to track diversity data for the 40 largest environmental organization. To expand on this work, in 2018, Taylor published an updated report that examined the status of diversity in over 2,000 American environmental nonprofits and the extent to which they report their demographic characteristics and diversity activities on the GuideStar reporting system. In 2019, she published new research on the lack of diversity reporting in environmental organizations.

=== Minority Environmental Leadership Development Initiative ===
With funding from the Joyce Foundation, Taylor founded the Multicultural Environmental Leadership Development Initiative (MELDI) in 2003. In 2005 she organized a national conference and in 2007 an international one for the purpose of assessing the status of diversity in the environmental field and to plan for enhancing diversity in the future. Several papers presented at the 2007 conference were published in the book, Environment and Social Justice: An International Perspective.

Taylor also conducted four studies of diversity, funded by the Joyce Foundation, the Ford Foundation, and the National Science Foundation, and published in BioScience, Journal of Environmental Education, Research in Social Problems and Public Policy, and Environmental Practice.

=== Environmental Fellows Program ===
In 2015, Taylor launched the Environmental Fellows Program (EFP) in partnership with the Environmental Grantmakers Association. The EFP is a national program that seeks to diversify the environmental and conservation philanthropic field through 12-week paid summer internships for graduate students at partner foundations and nonprofit organizations. Funders of the program include C.S. Mott, Island Foundation, New York Community Trust, Pisces Foundation, and more. The program aims to reduce barriers to entry for mid-level and senior-level jobs in environmental organizations and foundations for professionals from underrepresented backgrounds by connecting them to mentors and giving them experience in the field.

=== Doris Duke Conservation Scholars Program ===
In 2015, Taylor began the Yale School of the Environment branch of the Doris Duke Conservation Scholars Program (DDCSP), funded by the Doris Duke Charitable Foundation. In 2020, the program moved to Yale School of the Environment with Taylor. This program is a 2-summer internship aimed at diversifying the conservation sector by giving opportunities to students from underrepresented backgrounds in the field and those committed to diversity, equity, and inclusion. Through this experience, approximately 20 undergraduates gain experience each summer through one summer of lab research and an additional summer of an internship with environmental groups.

=== Diversity, equity, and inclusion conferences ===
In 2018, the New Horizons in Conservation Conference, spearheaded by Taylor, took place in Washington, DC. More than 200 students, faculty, environmental program and Doris Duke Conservation Scholars Program alumni, and conservation professionals—the majority of them people of color—gathered to "celebrate and assess" diversity, equity, and inclusion in the environmental sector, marking a milestone in conservation history. "The students and young professionals who attended this conference represent the future of conservation," Taylor said of the conference, "They are multicultural, multi-faceted, and talented, and they are poised to take on leadership roles in this sector. Diversity benefits us all, and there is strength in it." Programming included an extensive speaker series, community building, and career and academic development for program alumni.

The New Horizons in Conservation Conference is now an annual gathering for people who are from underrepresented backgrounds in the conservation field and those who are committed to the principals diversity, equity, and inclusion. The event draws attendees from across the nation, in varying professions and career stages, including but not limited to undergraduate and graduate students, academics, environmental professionals, policy advocates, and elected officials. New Horizons also works to bolster the critical pipelines built by diversity pathway programs across the nation by providing spaces for participants to connect with peers, network, engage in hands-on professional development workshops and training, attend local field trips, and hear from a diverse range of leaders and visionaries in the field. The second annual New Horizons in Conservation Conference took place in Chicago, Illinois in April 2019. The third annual conference was planned to take place in Ann Arbor, Michigan, in April 2020, but was cancelled due to the COVID-19 pandemic. The conference was virtually hosted by Yale School of the Environment in 2021, with over 800 participants from multiple countries. The 2022 conference will be hosted in New Haven, Connecticut.

=== Justice, Equity, Diversity and Sustainability Initiative ===
In 2021, Taylor began the Justice, Equity, Diversity, and Sustainability Initiative (JEDSI) at Yale School of the Environment. JEDSI seeks to examine the relationship between social inequalities, lived experiences, and environmental outcomes. JEDSI currently focuses on eight primary areas of research, teaching, and practice:

- Environmental History
- Nature, Outdoor Experiences, Attitudes, and Perceptions
- Environmental Inequalities, Resilience, and Sustainability
- Food and Farming: Access, Sovereignty, Food Justice
- Institutional Diversity, Transparency, and Workforce Dynamics
- Diversity Pathway Programming
- New Horizons in Conservation Conference
- Mentoring and Profiles of Environmental Professionals of Color

== Work on environmental justice ==
Taylor's award-winning book, The Environment and the People in American Cities (Duke University Press, 2009), focused on the environmental challenges American cities faced in the 17th through 20th centuries. She documented the race, class, and gender dynamics that arose as urban dwellers tried to deal with environmental problems. The book also demonstrated that from the outset environmental inequalities arose in American cities and were perpetuated in deliberate and unintentional ways. An "ambitious" and "impressive" work covering 500 years of history, The Environment and the People in American Cities is the first of three books, while the second of the series, The Rise of the American Conservation Movement (Duke University Press), was released in 2016. In it, she examines the emergence and rise of the American conservation movement from the mid-1800s to the early 1900s, demonstrating how race, class, and gender influenced every aspect of the movement from the establishment of parks to outdoor recreation and forest conservation; and the movement's links to nineteenth century ideologies. "Far-ranging," "nuanced," and "comprehensive," one scholar suggested that The Rise of the American Conservation Movement documents the movement in ways that will inspire readers to reconsider what they have been previously taught about environmental history.

Taylor's second book and third piece of her series, Toxic Communities: Environmental Racism, Industrial Pollution, and Residential Mobility (New York University Press, 2014) chronicles the contamination of minority and low income communities in the U.S. It examines seven different theories that have been used to explain why racial minorities and the poor are often found living adjacent to toxic facilities or undesirable land uses, and particularly challenges the assumption that minority communities have the requisite mobility to move away from such facilities. Grounded in practical examples, the book documents how the history of racially discriminatory housing policies has effectively forced minorities into proximity with polluting industries. The book incorporates insights from sociology and the study of urban development that had previously been ignored in environmental justice scholarship. One scholar suggested that, in view of Taylor's comprehensive treatment of the early history of the American environmental justice movement, her book should be "the last" to review that history in such detail, as future writers could simply refer parenthetically to her work.

== Work on food insecurity ==
In a project running from 2012 to 2018, Taylor collaborated with researchers from Grand Valley State University, Michigan State University, University of Michigan-Flint, Lake Superior State University, and the University of Wisconsin-Madison to work on a project that examines food insecurity in Michigan. A website known as Food Access in Michigan or FAIM, launched in August 2018. The study examines the relationship between demographic characteristics and the distribution of food outlets in 18 small and medium-sized cities in the state. It also examines effective nutrition and behavioral interventions, and mechanisms for enhancing access to food and participation in local food initiatives. These issues are being studied in Sault Ste. Marie, Brimley/ Bay Mills, and St. Ignace - towns in the Upper Peninsula; Holland, Muskegon, Benton Harbor, and Grand Rapids in the west; Flint, Saginaw, Lansing, and Kalamazoo in the central part; and Ypsilanti, Taylor, Southfield, Warren, Pontiac, Inkster, and Dearborn in the southeast. These cities have large populations of one or more of the following racial and ethnic groups: Blacks, Hispanics, Native Americans, Asians, and Arabs.

== Awards and recognition ==
- Allan Schnaiberg Outstanding Publication Award for book, Environment and the People in American Cities, 1600s-1900s: Disorder, Inequality, and Social Change, The Environment and Technology Section of the American Sociological Association, 2010
- Harold R. Johnson Diversity Service Award, University of Michigan, 2012
- Black Environmentalists During Black History Month, San Francisco, 2014
- Fred Buttel Distinguished Contribution Award, American Sociological Association, 2015
- Yale School of Forestry and Environmental Studies Outstanding Alumni Award, 2015
- Charles Horton Cooley Award, Michigan Sociological Association, 2015
- Burton V. Barnes Award for Academic Excellence, Sierra Club Michigan Chapter, 2017
- University of Michigan Distinguished Faculty Achievement Award, 2018
- President's Award from the Detroit Audubon Society, 2018
- Women in Conservation Rachel Carson Award, the National Audubon Society, 2018
- Freudenburg Lifetime Achievement Award, Association of Environmental Science and Studies, 2018
- National Science Foundation Presidential Award for Excellence in Science, Mathematics & Engineering Mentoring, 2018
- Featured in Women in Leadership Exhibit, Smithsonian Institution - Anacostia Museum, 2019
- EcoWorks Sustainable Communities Champion Award, EcoWorks Detroit, 2020
- Wilbur Cross Medal, Yale Graduate School Alumni Association, 2020,
- Recognized by AARP as one of 8 Leaders Who Carry On Martin Luther King Jr.'s Legacy, 2020
- Recognized by Green America as one of the 8 Black Leaders Who've Revolutionized the Climate Movement, 2020
- Celebrated as a Black Environmental Leader, Environmental Defense Fund, 2020
- Seal of Michigan, Michigan Legislative Black Caucus, 2020
- Women in Sustainability Award, Envision Charlotte and Wells Fargo, 2020
- Recognized by LiveKindly as one of 7 Black Environmentalists Shaping the Future, 2021
- Inducted as a Fellow in the American College of Environmental Lawyers, 2021
- Bouchet Leadership Medal, 2025

== Selected publications ==
=== Books ===
- Taylor, D.E. (2009). The Environment and the People in American Cities, 1600s-1900s: Disorder, Inequality and Social Change. Durham Duke University.
- Taylor, D.E. (2010). Environment and Social Justice: An International Perspective Vol: 18. Emerald Group Publishing Limited.
- Taylor, D.E. (2014). Toxic Communities: Environmental Racism, Industrial Pollution, and Residential Mobility. New York University Press.
- Taylor, D.E. (2016). The Rise of the American Conservation Movement: Power, Privilege, and Environmental Protection. Duke University Press.

=== Reports ===
- Taylor, Dorceta E.; Price, Kit; McCoy, Ember (2018). "Diversity Pathways: Broadening Participation in Environmental Organizations". ResearchGate. doi:10.13140/RG.2.2.19473.68963/1.
- Taylor, Dorceta E. (2018). "Diversity in Environmental Organizations Reporting and Transparency". ResearchGate. doi:10.13140/RG.2.2.24588.00649.
- Taylor, Dorceta E. (2014). "Environmental Organizations in the Great Lakes Region: An Assessment of Institutional Diversity". ResearchGate. doi:10.13140/RG.2.2.29479.24487.
- Taylor, Dorceta E. (2018). "The State of Diversity in Environmental Organizations Mainstream NGOs Foundations Government Agencies". ResearchGate. doi:10.13140/RG.2.2.34512.40962.

=== Articles ===
- Taylor D.E. (1988). "Environmental Education in Jamaica: The Implementation Gap between Policymakers, Teachers, and Students". The Journal of Environmental Education. 20 (1): 22–28. doi:10.1080/00958964.1988.9942777.
- Taylor D.E. (1989). "Blacks and the Environment: Towards an Explanation of the Concern and Action Gaps between Blacks and Whites". Environment and Behavior. 21 (2): 175–205. doi:10.1177/0013916589212003. S2CID 144930584.
- Taylor D.E. (1993). "Minority Environmental Activism in Britain: From Brixton to the Lake District" (PDF). Qualitative Sociology. 16 (3): 263–295. doi:10.1007/bf00990102. hdl:2027.42/43549. S2CID 143934535.
- Taylor D.E. and Winter P. (1995). Environmental Values, Ethics, and Depreciative Behavior in Wildland Settings. U.S.D.A. Pacific Southwest Research Station. General Technical Report PSW-156.
- Taylor D.E. (1997). "American Environmentalism: The Role of Race, Class and Gender. 1820-1995". Race, Gender & Class. 5 (1): 16–62.
- Taylor D.E. (1998). "The Urban Environment: The Intersection of White Middle Class and White Working Class Environmentalism (1820-1950s)". Advances in Human Ecology. 7: 207–292.
- Taylor D.E. (1999). "Central Park as a Model for Social Control: Urban Parks, Social Class and Leisure Behavior in Nineteenth-Century America". Journal of Leisure Research. 31 (4): 420–477. Bibcode:1999JLeiR..31..420T. doi:10.1080/00222216.1999.11949875.
- Taylor D.E. (2000). "Advances in Environmental Justice: Research, Theory and Methodology". American Behavioral Scientist. 43 (4): 508–580. doi:10.1177/0002764200043004003. S2CID 145706027.
- Taylor D.E. (2000). "Introduction". American Behavioral Scientist. 43 (4): 504–507. doi:10.1177/00027640021955423. S2CID 220679690.
- Taylor D.E. (2000). "The Rise of the Environmental Justice Paradigm: Injustice Framing and the Social Construction of Environmental Discourses". American Behavioral Scientist. 43 (4): 508–580. doi:10.1177/0002764200043004003. S2CID 145706027.
- Taylor D.E. ed (2000). Advances in Environmental Justice: Research, Theory and Methodology, American Behavioral Scientist 43.
- Taylor D.E. (2000). "Meeting the Challenge of Wild Land Recreation Management: Demographic Shifts and Social Inequality". Journal of Leisure Research. 32 (1): 171–179. Bibcode:2000JLeiR..32..171T. doi:10.1080/00222216.2000.11949910. S2CID 146412203.
- Taylor D.E. (2002). Race, Class, Gender and Environmentalism. U.S.D.A., Forest Service, PNW-GTR 534, Washington: Seattle.
- Taylor D.E. (2007). "Diversity and Equity in Environmental Organizations: The Salience of These Factors to Students". Journal of Environmental Education. 39 (1): 19–43. Bibcode:2007JEnEd..39a..19T. doi:10.3200/joee.39.1.19-44. S2CID 145725616.
- Taylor D.E. (2007). "Employment Preferences and Salary Expectations of Students in Science and Engineering". BioScience. 57 (2): 175–185. doi:10.1641/b570212. S2CID 86479641.
- Taylor D.E. (2008). Diversity and the Environment: Myth-Making and the Status of Minorities in the Field. Research in Social Problems and Public Policy 15, pp. 89–148.
- Lashley, Sarah; Taylor, Dorceta E. (2010). "Why can't they work together? A framework for understanding conflict and collaboration in two environmental disputes in Southeast Michigan". Environment and Social Justice: An International Perspective. Research in Social Problems and Public Policy. Vol. 18. pp. 409–449. doi:10.1108/S0196-1152(2010)0000018016. ISBN 978-0-85724-183-2.
- Freeman, Stephanie; Taylor, Dorceta E. (2010). "Heritage tourism: A mechanism to facilitate the preservation of black family farms". Environment and Social Justice: An International Perspective. Research in Social Problems and Public Policy. Vol. 18. pp. 261–285. doi:10.1108/S0196-1152(2010)0000018011. ISBN 978-0-85724-183-2.
- Chitewere, Tendai; Taylor, Dorceta E. (2010). "Sustainable living and community building in Ecovillage at Ithaca: The challenges of incorporating social justice concerns into the practices of an ecological cohousing community". Environment and Social Justice: An International Perspective. Research in Social Problems and Public Policy. Vol. 18. pp. 141–176. doi:10.1108/S0196-1152(2010)0000018007. ISBN 978-0-85724-183-2.
- Gin, June; Taylor, Dorceta E. (2010). "Movements, neighborhood change, and the media – Newspaper coverage of anti-gentrification activity in the San Francisco Bay Area: 1995–2005". Environment and Social Justice: An International Perspective. Research in Social Problems and Public Policy. Vol. 18. pp. 75–114. doi:10.1108/S0196-1152(2010)0000018005. ISBN 978-0-85724-183-2.
- Taylor, Dorceta E. (2010). "Equity, influence, and access: Central Park's role in historical and contemporary urban park financing". Environment and Social Justice: An International Perspective. Research in Social Problems and Public Policy. Vol. 18. pp. 29–73. doi:10.1108/S0196-1152(2010)0000018004. ISBN 978-0-85724-183-2.
- Taylor, Dorceta E. (2010). "Introduction". Environment and Social Justice: An International Perspective. Research in Social Problems and Public Policy. Vol. 18. pp. 3–27. doi:10.1108/S0196-1152(2010)0000018003. ISBN 978-0-85724-183-2.
- Taylor D.E. (2011). "Green Jobs and the Potential to Diversify the Environmental Workforce". Utah Environmental Law Review. 30 (2): 47–77.
- Taylor D.E. (2011). "Racial and Gender Differences in Job Mobility and Wages of Employees in Environmental Organizations". Environmental Practice. 13 (4): 370–385. doi:10.1017/s146604661100038x. S2CID 130462510.
- Taylor DE (2011). "The Evolution of Environmental Justice Activism, Research, and Scholarship". Environmental Practice. 13 (4): 280–301. doi:10.1017/s1466046611000329. S2CID 130069094.
- Taylor D.E. (2015). "Gender and Racial Diversity in Conservation Organizations: Uneven Accomplishments and Cause for Concern". Environmental Justice. 8 (5): 165–180. doi:10.1089/env.2015.0018.
- Taylor D.E. (2017). "Racial and Ethnic Differences in the Students' Readiness, Identity, Perceptions of Institutional Diversity, and Desire to Join the Environmental Workforce". Journal of Environmental Studies and Sciences. 8 (2): 152–168. doi:10.1007/s13412-017-0447-4. S2CID 186947515.
- Burdine J, Taylor D.E. (2018). "Neighborhood Characteristics and Urban Gardens in the Toledo Metropolitan Area: Staffing and Voluntarism, Food Production, Infrastructure, and Sustainability Practices". Local Environment. 22 (2): 198–219. Bibcode:2018LoEnv..23..198B. doi:10.1080/13549839.2017.1397614. S2CID 158311837.
- Taylor D.E. (2018). "Black Farmers in the U.S. and Michigan: Longevity, Empowerment, and Food Sovereignty". Journal of African American Studies. 22: 2. doi:10.1007/s12111-018-9394-8. S2CID 148685555.
- Taylor D.E. (2018). "Racial and Ethnic Differences in Connectedness to Nature and Landscape Preferences Among College Students". Environmental Justice. 11 (3): 118–136. doi:10.1089/env.2017.0040.
- Taylor D.E. (2018). "Enhancing racial diversity in the Association for Environmental Studies and Sciences". Journal of Environmental Studies and Sciences. 8 (4): 379–384. Bibcode:2018JEnSS...8..379T. doi:10.1007/s13412-018-0518-1. S2CID 158981159.
- Taylor D.E. (2019). "College Students and Nature: Differing Thoughts of Fear, Danger, Disconnection, and Loathing". Environmental Management. 64 (1): 79–96. Bibcode:2019EnMan..64...79T. doi:10.1007/s00267-019-01172-9. PMC 6598941. PMID 31076829.
- Taylor D.E.; Paul S.; McCoy E. (2019). "Diversity, Equity, and Inclusion and the Salience of Publicly Disclosing Demographic Data in American Environmental Nonprofits". Sustainability. 11 (19): 5491. doi:10.3390/su11195491.
- Rybarczyk, Greg; Taylor, Dorceta; Brines, Shannon; Wetzel, Richard (2019-12-25). "A Geospatial Analysis of Access to Ethnic Food Retailers in Two Michigan Cities: Investigating the Importance of Outlet Type within Active Travel Neighborhoods". International Journal of Environmental Research and Public Health. 17 (1): 166. doi:10.3390/ijerph17010166. PMC 6982187. PMID 31881710.
- Dorceta, Taylor; Lusuegro, Alliyah; Loong, Victoria; Cambridge, Alexis; Nichols, Claire; Goode, Maeghen; McCoy, Ember; Daupan, Meg; Bartlett, M'Lis; Noel, Erin; Pollvogt, Brayden (2021-05-08). "Racial, Gender, and Age Dynamics in Michigan's Urban and Rural Farmers Markets: Reducing Food Insecurity, and the Impacts of a Pandemic". American Behavioral Scientist. 66 (7): 894–936. doi:10.1177/00027642211013387. PMC 8107495. PMID 35645401. S2CID 234359196.
- Taylor, Dorceta (2021-05-14). "Understanding Black, Asian, Latinx, and White College Students' Views of Nature: Frequent Thoughts About Wild, Remote, Rural, and Urban Landscapes". American Behavioral Scientist. 66 (7): 989–1031. doi:10.1177/00027642211013403. S2CID 236547554.

== See also ==
- Diversity, equity, and inclusion
- Environmental history of the United States
