= Alan Lambowitz =

American academic

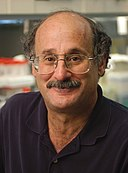
- Born: December 24, 1947 (age 78); Brooklyn, New York, United States
- Education: Brooklyn College; Yale University

Alan Marc Lambowitz (born December 24, 1947) is an American molecular biologist. He holds the Mr. and Mrs. A. Frank Smith, Jr. Regents Chair in Molecular Biology at the University of Texas at Austin, where he is a professor in the Department of Molecular Biosciences in the College of Natural Sciences and the Department of Medicine / Oncology at Dell Medical School. His research has focused on mitochondrial plasmids that encode primitive reverse transcriptases, mobile genetic elements, catalytic intron RNAs (ribozymes) and a variety of novel reverse transcriptases. His discoveries include one of the first examples of protein-assisted RNA catalysis, the finding that certain introns in mitochondrial DNA and bacteria are mobile genetic elements, and the demonstration that RNA helicases can function as RNA chaperones. He developed RNA-guided gene targeting vectors known as targetrons and the use of thermostable group II intron reverse transcriptases (TGIRTs) for RNA cloning and next-generation sequencing. He was elected to the American Academy of Arts and Sciences in 1995 and the National Academy of Sciences in 2004.

== Early life and education ==
Alan Lambowitz was born in Brooklyn, New York, on December 24, 1947. He attended Stuyvesant High School, which specializes in science. He has credited time spent at the American Museum of Natural History with developing his interest in biology. He received a Bachelor of Science degree from Brooklyn College in 1968, graduating summa cum laude with honors in chemistry.

Lambowitz completed his graduate studies in molecular biophysics and biochemistry at Yale University, receiving an M.Phil. in 1970 and a Ph.D. in 1972. His doctoral research, carried out in the laboratory of Carolyn Slayman, compared electron transport and oxidative phosphorylation in wild-type Neurospora crassa and the mitochondrial mutant poky.

== Career ==
From 1972 to 1973 Lambowitz was a postdoctoral fellow with Walter Bonner at the Johnson Research Foundation of the University of Pennsylvania, where his study of b-cytochromes in plant mitochondria showed that a then-popular chemical intermediate theory of oxidative phosphorylation was incorrect. In 1973 he joined the laboratory of David Luck, one of the co-discoverers of mitochondrial DNA, at Rockefeller University as a research associate. There he found that part of the Neurospora mitochondrial genome encodes a ribosomal protein, contrary to the prevailing view that mitochondrial DNA encoded only components of the electron transport system. He was a senior staff fellow at the National Institute of Mental Health from 1975 to 1976.

In 1976 Lambowitz joined the Edward A. Doisy Department of Biochemistry at Saint Louis University School of Medicine as an assistant professor, becoming an associate professor in 1979 and a full professor in 1982; from 1978 to 1986 he was also a member of the Medical Mycology Center at Washington University School of Medicine in St. Louis. In 1986 he moved to Ohio State University as Ohio Eminent Scholar in Molecular Genetics and professor of molecular genetics, biochemistry and medical biochemistry, positions he held until 1997.

In 1997 Lambowitz moved to the University of Texas at Austin to become director of the newly formed Institute for Cellular and Molecular Biology, which he led until 2016. By 2006 he had helped recruit more than 40 new faculty members to the institute. He holds the Mr. and Mrs. A. Frank Smith, Jr. Regents Chair in Molecular Biology in the College of Natural Sciences and is also a professor in the Department of Medicine / Oncology at Dell Medical School since 2018.

Lambowitz was an editor of the journal Plasmid from 1987 to 1998 and associate editor of Fungal Genetics and Biology from 1988 to 2005, and has served on the editorial boards of Molecular and Cellular Biology, RNA, the Proceedings of the National Academy of Sciences, and Mobile DNA. He served on the board of directors of the Academy of Medicine, Engineering and Science of Texas from 2010 to 2012 and currently serves on the scientific advisory board of the RNA Institute at the University at Albany, SUNY. He was a co-editor of the reference volumes Mobile DNA II (2002) and Mobile DNA III (2015), published by ASM Press.

== Research ==
=== Mitochondrial genetics and plasmids ===
Lambowitz spent the early part of his career studying the bread mold Neurospora crassa, which he continued to use after many researchers turned to yeast because of its advantages for mitochondrial genetic research in a fully aerobic organism. At Saint Louis University his group found that some natural Neurospora strains carry plasmid DNAs in their mitochondria, and later identified the primary defect of the mitochondrial DNA poky mutant as a four-base-pair deletion at the 5′ end of the mitochondrial small ribosomal RNA. Sequencing of the mitochondrial plasmids showed that they encode a reverse transcriptase, and his laboratory found that the Mauriceville plasmid reverse transcriptase can initiate cDNA synthesis de novo, without a primer, suggesting how a primitive reverse transcriptase could have evolved from an RNA-dependent RNA polymerase.

=== Protein-assisted RNA splicing and RNA chaperones ===
While screening Neurospora nuclear mutants defective in mitochondrial ribosome assembly, Lambowitz's group found that several of them affected splicing of an intron in the mitochondrial large ribosomal RNA. One of the mutant genes encodes the mitochondrial tyrosyl-tRNA synthetase (CYT-18 protein), which his group showed functions in splicing group I introns in addition to its role in protein synthesis. Protein-assisted RNA catalysis of this kind is among the discoveries for which he is best known. In collaboration with Barbara Golden's group at Purdue University, his laboratory determined the crystal structure of this protein bound to a group I intron RNA. Another of the mutant genes encodes a DEAD-box protein, and his laboratory later showed that a DEAD-box protein can function as an ATP-dependent RNA chaperone in group I intron splicing, establishing that RNA helicases can act as RNA chaperones that enables folding of cellular RNAs into biologically active structures.

=== Mobile group II introns ===
Lambowitz focused a majority of his research on group II introns, catalytic RNAs found mainly in bacteria and in the mitochondria and chloroplasts of fungi and plants. His group showed that group II introns encode a reverse transcriptase that also helps the intron RNA fold into its active structure for RNA splicing. With Philip Perlman, he showed that yeast mitochondrial group II introns are mobile genetic elements that use the excised intron RNA as the mobility intermediate, and with Marlene Belfort he showed that a bacterial group II intron moves by a related mechanism. In this process, termed retrohoming, the intron RNA inserts itself directly into one strand of a DNA target site by reverse splicing, and the intron-encoded reverse transcriptase cleaves the opposite strand and uses it to prime reverse transcription of the inserted intron RNA. His laboratory has also studied the mechanisms by which mobile group II introns spread to new sites within genomes and their evolutionary relationship to retrotransposons and spliceosomal introns.

=== Targetrons ===
Because group II introns recognize their DNA target sites largely by base pairing, Lambowitz's laboratory reprogrammed them to insert into chosen DNA sequences, creating RNA-guided gene targeting vectors called targetrons. In 2000 his group reported group II introns designed to insert into therapeutically relevant DNA sites in human cells, including HIV-1 proviral DNA. Targetron technology, licensed through InGex, was commercialized by Sigma-Aldrich in 2005 as the TargeTron gene knockout system for site-specific gene disruption in bacteria. His group later developed a thermotargetron for gene targeting in thermophilic bacteria and applied it to Clostridium thermocellum, a microbe used in biofuel production.

=== Thermostable group II intron reverse transcriptases ===
Lambowitz's laboratory developed methods for expressing thermostable group II intron reverse transcriptases (TGIRTs) from thermophilic bacteria and applied them to high-throughput RNA sequencing (RNA-seq). TGIRTs have higher thermostability, processivity and fidelity than retroviral reverse transcriptases, together with a template-switching activity that attaches RNA-seq adapters during cDNA synthesis without RNA ligation. These properties were used to develop TGIRT-seq, a method for comprehensive profiling of protein-coding and non-coding RNAs, including structured small RNAs such as tRNAs that are poorly represented by other methods. TGIRTs have also been used in methods developed with other laboratories, including DMS-MaPseq for probing RNA structure in living cells, and the template-switching method has been adapted for sequencing single-stranded DNA from human plasma. In collaboration with Randy Schekman's laboratory at the University of California, Berkeley, his group used TGIRT-seq to analyze the RNAs in extracellular vesicles and exosomes. A TGIRT enzyme and RNA-seq kits were initially supplied by InGex, which licensed the technology from the Ohio State University and the University of Texas at Austin. As of 2023, the Lambowitz laboratory was providing purified TGIRT enzyme to researchers on request, and the TGIRT expression plasmid was available for non-commercial research under a University of Texas at Austin Material Transfer Agreement. The university has made the TGIRT patent portfolio available for licensing and commercialization.

=== Bacterial reverse transcriptases, CRISPR RNA spacer acquisition, and DNA repair ===
In collaboration with Andrew Fire's laboratory at Stanford University, Lambowitz's group showed in 2016 that a reverse transcriptase–Cas1 fusion protein associated with a type III CRISPR system in the marine bacterium Marinomonas mediterranea enables the acquisition of CRISPR spacers directly from RNA, a mechanism for the reverse flow of genetic information from RNA to DNA. Later work showed that this protein also contains a Cas6 domain required for both CRISPR RNA biogenesis and RNA spacer acquisition, and that it adds short 3′ DNA tails to RNA fragments, enabling their direct integration into CRISPR arrays as RNA spacers.

In 2022 his group reported that a bacterial group II intron-like reverse transcriptase (G2L4 RT) functions in DNA repair, with biochemical activities strikingly similar to those of human DNA polymerase θ, which it uses for translesion DNA synthesis and double-strand break repair by microhomology-mediated end joining. A 2025 study described the structural adaptations that enable this enzyme to function in host cell DNA repair, and a 2026 study in collaboration with Yi-Chih Lin's laboratory at the University of Texas at Austin used high-speed atomic force microscopy to visualize this DNA repair process in real time.

=== RNA diagnostics and liquid biopsy ===
Lambowitz's laboratory has applied TGIRT-seq to human cellular, extracellular vesicle and plasma RNAs for RNA diagnostics and liquid biopsy of human diseases. His group identified protein-protected mRNA fragments and structured excised intron RNAs in human plasma, and reported that human cells contain large numbers of excised linear intron RNAs with links to gene regulation and potential utility as biomarkers. In a 2026 study with researchers at the University of Texas MD Anderson Cancer Center, TGIRT-seq of tumor and blood samples identified RNA differences, including intron RNA fragments in plasma, that distinguished patients with inflammatory breast cancer from those with other breast cancers and from healthy donors.

== Awards and honours ==
- NIH MERIT Award (1993)
- Fellow of the American Academy of Arts and Sciences (1995)
- Fellow of the American Association for the Advancement of Science (2001)
- Fellow of the American Academy of Microbiology
- Member of the National Academy of Sciences (2004)
- Member of the Academy of Medicine, Engineering and Science of Texas (2004)
- Wilbur Cross Medal, Yale Graduate School of Arts and Sciences (2013)

== Selected publications ==
- Akins, R. A.; Lambowitz, A. M. (1987). "A protein required for splicing group I introns in Neurospora mitochondria is mitochondrial tyrosyl-tRNA synthetase or a derivative thereof". Cell. 50 (3): 331–345. doi:10.1016/0092-8674(87)90488-0.
- Kennell, J. C.; Moran, J. V.; Perlman, P. S.; Butow, R. A.; Lambowitz, A. M. (1993). "Reverse transcriptase activity associated with maturase-encoding group II introns in yeast mitochondria". Cell. 73 (1): 133–146. doi:10.1016/0092-8674(93)90166-n.
- Wang, H.; Lambowitz, A. M. (1993). "The Mauriceville plasmid reverse transcriptase can initiate cDNA synthesis de novo and may be related to reverse transcriptase and DNA polymerase progenitor". Cell. 75 (6): 1071–1081. doi:10.1016/0092-8674(93)90317-j.
- Zimmerly, S.; Guo, H.; Perlman, P. S.; Lambowitz, A. M. (1995). "Group II intron mobility occurs by target DNA-primed reverse transcription". Cell. 82 (4): 545–554.
- Yang, J.; Zimmerly, S.; Perlman, P. S.; Lambowitz, A. M. (1996). "Efficient integration of an intron RNA into double-stranded DNA by reverse splicing". Nature. 381 (6580): 332–335. doi:10.1038/381332a0.
- Guo, H.; Karberg, M.; Long, M.; Jones, J. P. III; Sullenger, B.; Lambowitz, A. M. (2000). "Group II introns designed to insert into therapeutically relevant DNA target sites in human cells". Science. 289 (5478): 452–457. doi:10.1126/science.289.5478.452.
- Mohr, S.; Stryker, J. M.; Lambowitz, A. M. (2002). "A DEAD-box protein functions as an ATP-dependent RNA chaperone in group I intron splicing". Cell. 109 (6): 769–779.
- Qin, Y.; Yao, J.; Wu, D. C.; Nottingham, R. M.; Mohr, S.; Hunicke-Smith, S.; Lambowitz, A. M. (2016). "High-throughput sequencing of human plasma RNA by using thermostable group II intron reverse transcriptases". RNA. 22 (1): 111–128. doi:10.1261/rna.054809.115.
- Silas, S.; Mohr, G.; Sidote, D. J.; Markham, L. M.; Sanchez-Amat, A.; Bhaya, D.; Lambowitz, A. M.; Fire, A. Z. (2016). "Direct CRISPR spacer acquisition from RNA by a natural reverse transcriptase–Cas1 fusion protein". Science. 351 (6276): aad4234. doi:10.1126/science.aad4234.
- Park, S. K.; Mohr, G.; Yao, J.; Russell, R.; Lambowitz, A. M. (2022). "Group II intron-like reverse transcriptases function in double-strand break repair". Cell. 185 (20): 3671–3688.e23. doi:10.1016/j.cell.2022.08.014.
- Wylie, D.; Wang, X.; Yao, J.; Xu, H.; Ferrick-Kiddie, E. A.; Iwase, T.; Krishnamurthy, S.; Ueno, N. T.; Lambowitz, A. M. (2026). "Pervasive enhanced transcription in inflammatory breast cancer tumors and PBMCs impacts RNA splicing and intronic RNAs in plasma". Science Advances. 12 (18): eadu0031. doi:10.1126/sciadv.adu0031.
