= Annette Thomas =

American-born publishing executive

Annette Thomas (born 1965) is an American-born publishing executive specializing in science publishing, who lives in the United Kingdom. In 2020, she was named chief executive of the Guardian Media Group, but left the role in June 2021.

== Early life ==
Thomas was born in Washington, D.C. in 1965, and grew up near Washington. Her African American father worked as a pharmacist at the Food and Drug Administration; her mother is German. She attended the Eleanor Roosevelt High School, Greenbelt, Maryland. She has a degree in biochemistry and biophysics from Harvard University and a PhD in cell biology and neuroscience from Yale University.

== Career ==
In 1993, immediately after finishing her graduate work, Thomas moved to London to begin her career in publishing as a cell biology editor at Nature. She served as the founding editor of Nature Cell Biology. She became publisher (1999) and then managing director of the Nature Publishing Group in 2000. She was responsible for founding the Nature Reviews series. Other positions that she has held include chief executive of Macmillan Science and Education, as well as leadership roles at Clarivate Analytics' Web of Science citation and abstract search database.

Thomas is a trustee and member of the governing board of Yale University. She is also a past recipient of the prestigious Wilbur Cross Medal, awarded to distinguished Yale Graduate School alumni. She has previously served on the Creative Commons Board of Directors.

Thomas was appointed and named chief executive of the Guardian Media Group on 14 January 2020. She began in the role in March 2020. Later that year, Thomas was recognised as one of the United Kingdom's most influential Black People by being included in the 2021 edition of the annual Powerlist.

In 2021, Thomas said at a media industry conference "we have quality content in spades ... the job at hand is to now go further by strengthening the growing elements of our business". In May 2021 The Daily Telegraph reported that there was serious conflict between Thomas and editor Katharine Viner about finances and the direction the newspaper should take. The previous year The Guardian announced 180 job cuts. On 9 June 2021, it was announced that Thomas would leave the Guardian Media Group at the end of the month. She received £795,000 in severance pay from the Guardian Media Group. It was described as a 'one-off payment and it was reported that she had collected over £1.5 million pounds during her 15 months as chief executive.

Thomas has been appointed as a non-executive director of publisher Pearson plc, from 1 October 2021.

== Personal life ==
Thomas has lived in the United Kingdom since about 1995, most recently in Cambridge. She is married to a scientist. They have three sons and a daughter.
