= Fructose bisphosphatase deficiency =

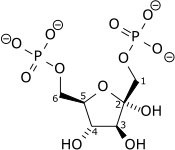
- Fructose 1,6-bisphosphate
- Specialty: Endocrinology
- Symptoms: hypoglycemia
- Frequency: very rare

In fructose bisphosphatase deficiency, there is not enough fructose bisphosphatase for gluconeogenesis to occur correctly. Glycolysis (the breakdown of glucose) will still work, as it does not use this enzyme.

== History ==
The first known description of a patient with this condition was published in 1970 in The Lancet journal.

Early research into the disorder was conducted by a team led by Anthony S. Pagliara and Barbara Illingworth Brown at Washington University Medical Center, based on the case of an infant girl from Oak Ridge, Missouri.

== Presentation ==
Without effective gluconeogenesis (GNG), hypoglycaemia will set in after about 12 hours of fasting. This is the time when liver glycogen stores have been exhausted, and the body has to rely on GNG. When given a dose of glucagon (which would normally increase blood glucose) nothing will happen, as stores are depleted and GNG doesn't work. (In fact, the patient would already have high glucagon levels.)

There is no problem with the metabolism of glucose or galactose, but fructose and glycerol cannot be used by the liver to maintain blood glucose levels. If fructose or glycerol are given, there will be a buildup of phosphorylated three-carbon sugars. This leads to phosphate depletion within the cells, and also in the blood. Without phosphate, ATP cannot be made, and many cell processes cannot occur.

High levels of glucagon will tend to release fatty acids from adipose tissue, and this will combine with glycerol that cannot be used in the liver, to make triacylglycerides causing a fatty liver.

As three carbon molecules cannot be used to make glucose, they will instead be made into pyruvate and lactate. These acids cause a drop in the pH of the blood (a metabolic acidosis). Acetyl CoA (acetyl co-enzyme A) will also build up, leading to the creation of ketone bodies.

== Diagnosis ==
Diagnosis is made by measurement of FDPase in cultured lymphocytes and confirmed by detection of mutation of FBP1, encoding FDPase.

== Treatment ==
To treat people with a deficiency of this enzyme, they must avoid needing gluconeogenesis to make glucose. This can be accomplished by not fasting for long periods, and eating high-carbohydrate food. They should avoid fructose containing foods (as well as sucrose which breaks down to fructose).

As with all single-gene metabolic disorders, there is always hope for genetic therapy, inserting a healthy copy of the gene into existing liver cells.

== See also ==
- Fructose
- Gluconeogenesis
- Metabolism
