= A. Bartlett Giamatti =

American baseball commissioner and academic administrator (1938–1989)

7th Commissioner of Baseball
- In office April 1, 1989 – September 1, 1989
- Preceded by: Peter Ueberroth
- Succeeded by: Fay Vincent

14th President of the National League
- In office June 10, 1986 – April 1, 1989
- Commissioner: Peter Ueberroth
- Preceded by: Chub Feeney
- Succeeded by: Bill White

19th President of Yale University
- In office December 20, 1978 – June 10, 1986
- Preceded by: Hanna Holborn Gray (Acting)
- Succeeded by: Benno C. Schmidt Jr.

Personal details
- Born: Angelo Bartlett Giamatti; April 4, 1938 Boston, Massachusetts, U.S.
- Died: September 1, 1989 (aged 51) Edgartown, Massachusetts, U.S.
- Spouse: Toni Marilyn Smith (m. 1960)
- Children: 3, including Paul and Marcus
- Education: Yale University (BA, PhD)

Angelo Bartlett "Bart" Giamatti (/ˌdʒiːəˈmɑːti/ JEE-ə-MAH-tee; April 4, 1938 – September 1, 1989) was an American professor of English Renaissance literature, the president of Yale University, and the seventh commissioner of Major League Baseball.

Giamatti served as Commissioner for only five months before dying suddenly of a heart attack. He is the shortest-tenured baseball commissioner in the sport's history and the only holder of the office not to preside over a full Major League Baseball season. Giamatti's most notable act as Commissioner was to negotiate the agreement resolving the Pete Rose betting scandal in which Rose was permitted to voluntarily withdraw from the sport to avoid further punishment.

== Personal life ==
Giamatti was born in Boston and grew up in South Hadley, Massachusetts, the son of Mary Claybaugh Walton (Smith College, 1935) and Valentine John Giamatti. His father was professor and chairman of the Department of Italian Language and Literature at Mount Holyoke College. Giamatti's paternal grandparents were Italian immigrants Angelo Giammattei (Italian pronunciation: [dʒammatˈtɛi]) and Maria Lavorgna (Italian pronunciation: [laˈvɔrɲa; -orɲa]): his grandfather Angelo emigrated to the United States from Telese, near Benevento, Italy, around 1900. Giamatti's maternal grandparents, from Wakefield, Massachusetts, were Helen Buffum (Davidson) and Bartlett Walton, who graduated from Phillips Academy Andover and Harvard College. Giamatti attended South Hadley High School, spent his junior year at the American Overseas School of Rome, and graduated from Phillips Academy in 1956. At Yale College, he was a member of Delta Kappa Epsilon (Phi chapter) and as a junior in 1960 was tapped by Scroll and Key, a senior secret society. He graduated magna cum laude in 1960.

In 1960, he married Toni Marilyn Smith, who taught English for more than 20 years at the Hopkins School in New Haven, Connecticut, until her death in 2004. Together the couple had three children: actors Paul and Marcus and jewelry designer Elena.

== Yale ==
Giamatti stayed in New Haven to receive his doctorate in 1964, when he also published a volume of essays by Thomas G. Bergin he had co-edited with a philosophy graduate student, T. K. Seung. He became a professor of comparative literature at Yale University, an author, and master of Ezra Stiles College at Yale, a post to which he was appointed by his predecessor as Yale president, Kingman Brewster Jr.

Giamatti taught briefly at Princeton but spent most of his academic life at Yale. His scholarly work focused on English Renaissance literature, particularly Edmund Spenser, and relationships between English and Italian Renaissance poets. His tenure as Stiles master ended in 1972.

Giamatti served as president of Yale University from 1978 to 1986. He was the youngest president of the university in its history and presided over the university during a bitter strike by its clerical and technical workers in 1984–1985. As university president, he refused student, faculty, and community demands to divest from apartheid South Africa. Giamatti prohibited students from playing Bladderball on campus after years of increasingly strange pranks and several student hospitalizations in 1982. He also served on the board of trustees of Mount Holyoke College for many years. Giamatti was elected a fellow of the American Academy of Arts and Sciences in 1980 and a member of the American Philosophical Society in 1982.

== Baseball ==
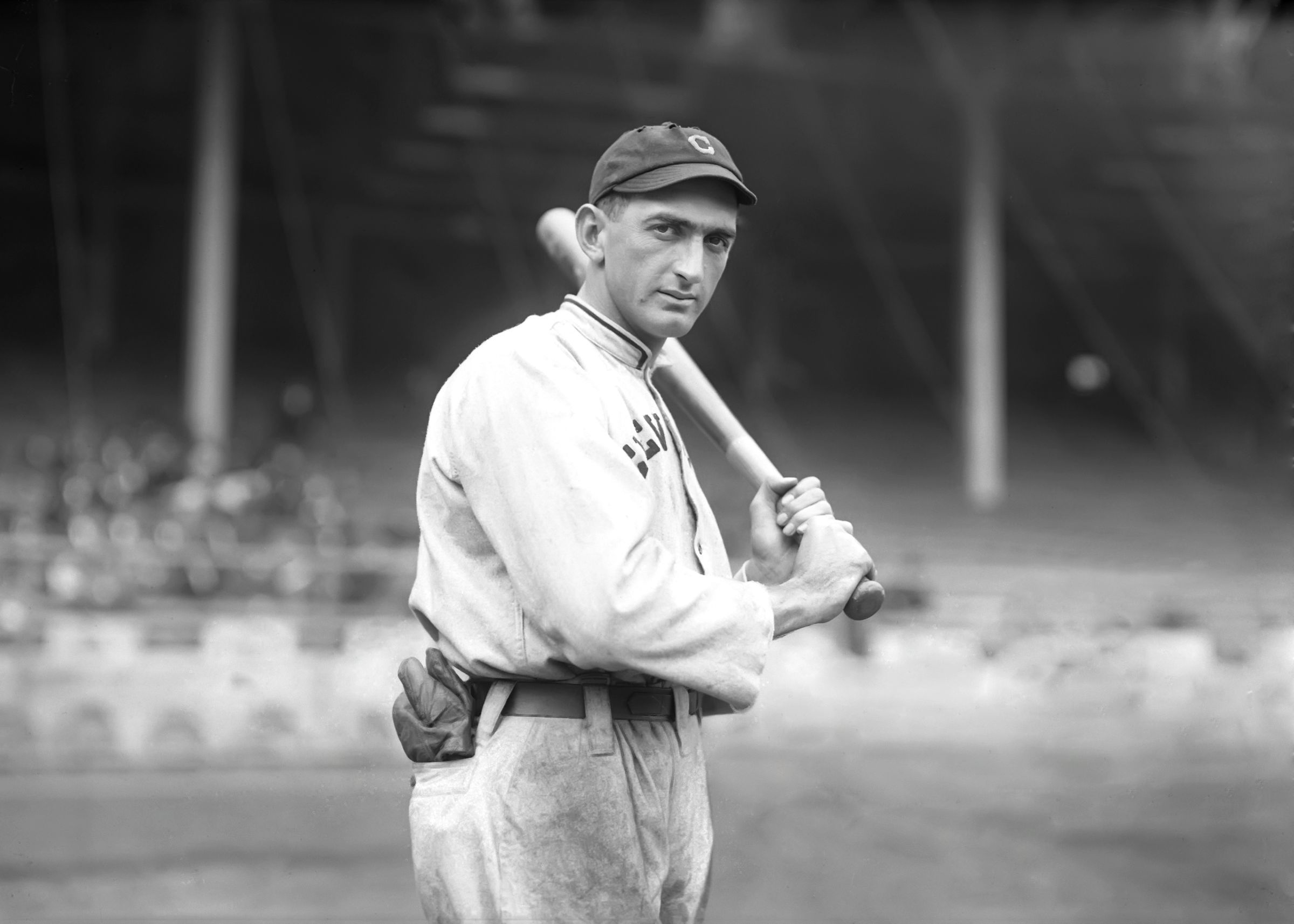
In 1989, Giamatti declined to reinstate Shoeless Joe Jackson because the case was "now best given to historical analysis and debate as opposed to a present-day review with an eye to reinstatement".

Giamatti had a lifelong interest in baseball and was a noted Boston Red Sox fan. In 1978, when he was first rumored to be a candidate for the presidency of Yale, he had deflected questions by observing that "The only thing I ever wanted to be president of was the American League." He also wrote several noteworthy essays about baseball, including "The Green Fields of the Mind", published in the Yale Alumni Magazine in November 1977; "Tom Seaver's Farewell", published in Harper's Magazine in September 1977; and "Baseball and the American Character," published in Harper's in October 1986.

Giamatti was named president of the National League in 1986. During his stint in that position, he placed an emphasis on the need to improve the environment for the fan in the ballparks. He also decided to make umpires strictly enforce the balk rule and cited affirmative action as a remedy for the lack of minority managers, coaches, or executives in the major leagues.

While still serving as National League president, Giamatti suspended Pete Rose for 30 games after Rose shoved umpire Dave Pallone on April 30, 1988. Later that year, Giamatti also suspended Los Angeles Dodgers pitcher Jay Howell for three days, after Howell was caught using pine tar during the National League Championship Series.

Giamatti, whose tough dealing with Yale's union favorably impressed Major League Baseball owners, was unanimously elected to succeed Peter Ueberroth as commissioner on September 8, 1988. He formally took office on April 1, 1989. Determined to maintain the integrity of the game, on August 24, 1989, Giamatti prevailed upon Pete Rose to agree voluntarily to remain permanently ineligible to play baseball.

== Death ==
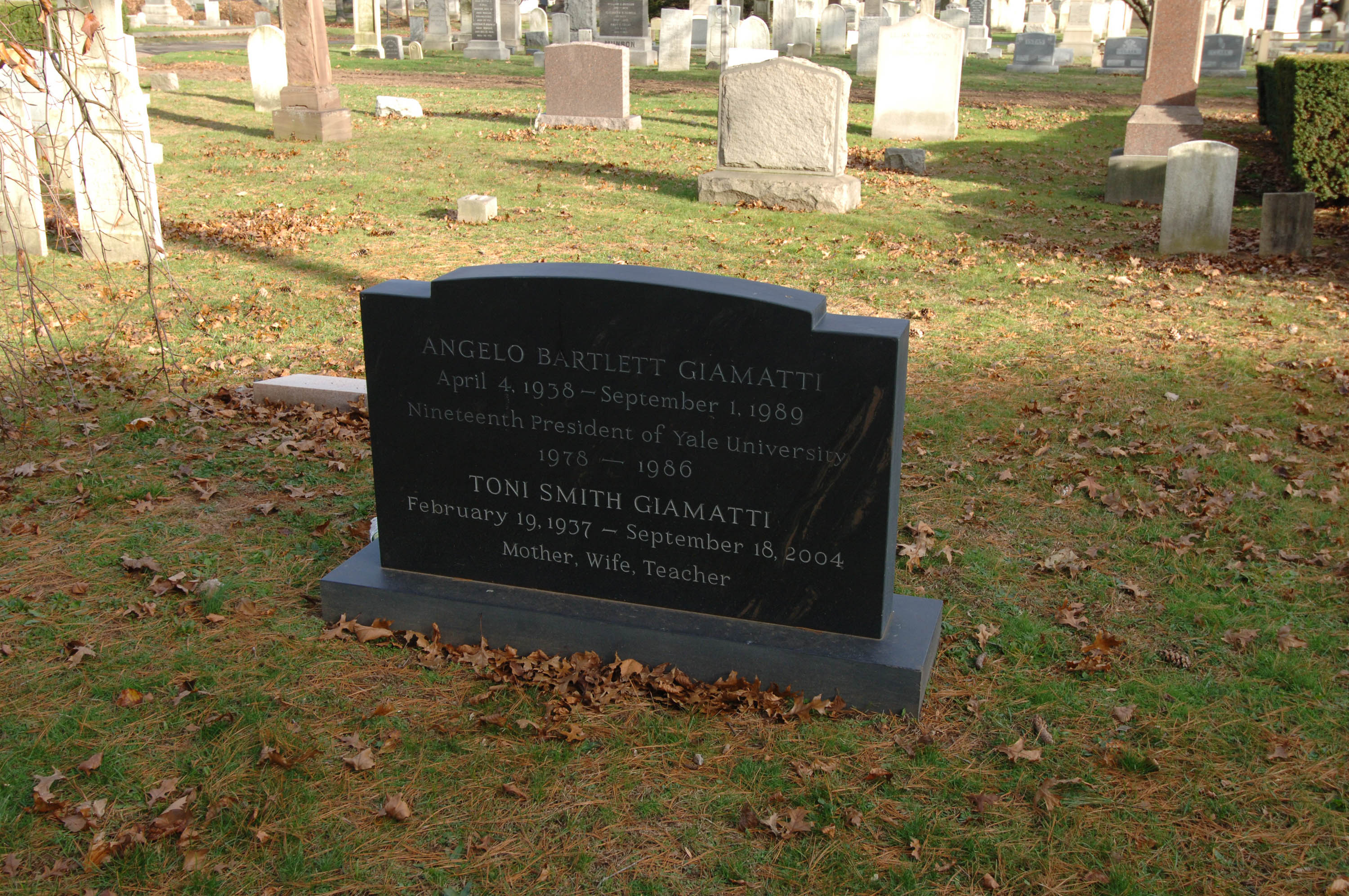
Giamatti's grave in New Haven, Connecticut

While at his vacation home in Edgartown on Martha's Vineyard, Giamatti, a heavy smoker for many years, died suddenly of a heart attack at the age of 51, eight days after banishing Pete Rose and 154 days into his tenure as commissioner. He was interred at Grove Street Cemetery in New Haven, Connecticut. He became the second baseball commissioner to die in office, the first being Kenesaw Mountain Landis in 1944.

Fay Vincent, Giamatti's close friend and baseball's first deputy commissioner, became acting commissioner upon Giamatti's death, and was quickly elected by MLB owners to succeed Giamatti as the new commissioner. On October 14, 1989, before Game 1 at the World Series, Giamatti—to whom this World Series was dedicated—was memorialized with a moment of silence. Son Marcus Giamatti threw out the first pitch before the game. Also before Game One, the Yale Whiffenpoofs sang the national anthem, a blend of "The Star-Spangled Banner" with "America the Beautiful" that has been since repeated by other a cappella groups.

== Legacy ==
The Little League Eastern Regional Headquarters in Bristol, Connecticut is named after Giamatti. One of the three awards given annually by Major League Baseball's Baseball Assistance Program is named the "Bart Giamatti Award".

Giamatti was inducted into the National Italian American Sports Hall of Fame in 1992.

James Reston Jr. notes in his book Collision at Home Plate: The Lives of Pete Rose and Bart Giamatti that Giamatti suffered from Charcot-Marie-Tooth disease, an inherited neuromuscular disease affecting peripheral nerves.

Neil Thomas Proto argues in his book Fearless: A. Bartlett Giamatti and the Battle for Fairness that Giamatti's early life with his parents and family in New Haven established the code of conduct about fairness that tempered his decision about Pete Rose. Proto also states that as president of Yale, Giamatti was a consequential force in changing Yale's once-harmful relationship with New Haven; in reintroducing Sterling Scholarships for New Haven high school students, which had been discontinued by his predecessors; in challenging the eugenics culture at Yale, which had spread nationally and affected Yale's view of urban renewal; and in challenging an admissions system that excluded applicants on the basis of race and religion. According to Proto, Giamatti believed the university's duty was to educate students in the civic responsibility of good citizenship, not the elitist imperative of creating "leaders."

The research library at the National Baseball Hall of Fame and Museum is named in his honor.

== Works ==
- Master Pieces from the Files of T.G.B., ed. Thomas K. Swing and A. Bartlett Giamatti (1964).
- The Earthly Paradise and the Renaissance Epic (1966)
- Play of Double Senses: Spenser's Faerie Queene (1975)
- The University and the Public Interest (1981)
- Exile and Change in Renaissance Literature (1984)
- Take Time for Paradise: Americans and their Games (1989)
- A Free and Ordered Space: The Real World of the University (1990)
- A Great and Glorious Game: Baseball Writings of A. Bartlett Giamatti (ed. Kenneth Robson, 1998)

== See also ==
- List of presidents of Yale University

Academic offices
| Preceded by Hanna Holborn Gray, acting | President of Yale University; 1977–1986 | Succeeded by Benno C. Schmidt Jr. |
