= Stephen Pitti =

American historian (born c. 1969)

Stephen Pitti (born c. 1969) is a Mexican American historian currently on the faculty of Yale University. In 2003, Princeton University Press published his first major book, The Devil in Silicon Valley: Northern California, Race, and Mexican Americans. He currently directs the Latina/o History Project at Yale, which studies the history of Mexican Americans, Puerto Ricans, Dominican Americans, Cuban Americans, and other Latinos in the United States.

== Life ==
Pitti grew up in Sacramento, California. He graduated from Yale University in 1991 and earned his Ph.D. in history in 1998 from Stanford University. His dissertation adviser was Albert Camarillo. He is married to Alicia Schmidt Camacho, who is the current head of Ezra Stiles College.

== Works ==
- The Devil in Silicon Valley: Northern California, Race, and Mexican Americans. Princeton University Press. 15 August 2004 [2003]. ISBN 9780691118468.
