= Richard B. Sewall =

American academic

Richard Benson Sewall
- Born: February 11, 1908; Albany, New York
- Died: April 16, 2003 (aged 95); Newton, Massachusetts
- Education: Phillips Exeter Academy; Williams College; Yale University (Ph.D)
- Spouse: Mathilde Parmelee (m. 1940; died 1974)
- Scientific career
- Workplaces: Clark University; Yale University

Richard Benson Sewall (11 February 1908 – 16 April 2003) was a professor of English at Yale University, and author of the influential works The Life of Emily Dickinson and The Vision of Tragedy.

He was born in Albany, New York to a family with a long Congregational tradition: his father, Reverend Charles G. Sewall, was the thirteenth son in an unbroken chain of Congregational ministers. His mother, Kate Strong, was the daughter of Reverend Augustus Hopkins Strong, president of the Rochester Theological Seminary.

Sewall attended Phillips Exeter Academy, graduated from Williams College and received his PhD from Yale in 1933. He taught initially at Clark University, then at Yale for 42 years, from 1934 to 1976. For much of that period he taught "English 61", a course on tragedy that became so popular it was held in Yale's largest lecture hall. He also taught, from 1941, "Daily Themes", a writing class that was a training ground for many authors, including William F. Buckley, Calvin Trillin, and Bob Woodward. (Note: He succeeded Professor William Lyon ("Billy") Phelps as teacher; during Phelps's tenure, Sinclair Lewis, Stephen Vincent Benét, Thornton Wilder, Philip Barry, and Walter Millis had passed through the course.)

He was popular with both the students he taught and those he dealt with in his various administrative roles, which included stints as a member of the Committee on Manners and Morals and as first master of Ezra Stiles College. During the Vietnam Era he supported the activities of peace activists on campus, making William Sloane Coffin and Allard Lowenstein fellows of Ezra Stiles College. He played a key role in preventing campus violence during the New Haven Black Panther trials by persuading Yale President Kingman Brewster to take a conciliatory rather than oppositional approach to campus demonstrations. One of Yale's awards named for him, the Harwood F. Byrnes/Richard B. Sewall Teaching Prize, is presented each year to the professor who "has given the most time, energy and effective effort" to educating undergraduates.

The Life of Emily Dickinson, published in 1974, won the U.S. National Book Award in Biography. It dispelled many myths about the poet, especially her depiction as the "Nun of Amherst," a neurotic lovelorn woman too fragile for the world who turned to poetry as solace for an unhappy life. However, as Sewall was named the executor of Millicent Todd's estate and worked significantly from her papers, the biography has been criticized by Dickinson biographer Lyndall Gordon as being too influenced by the image of Dickinson created by Mabel Loomis and Millicent Todd, supposedly passing along a skewed perspective of Emily and Susan Dickinson.
