= Paul Freedman =

American academic (born 1949)

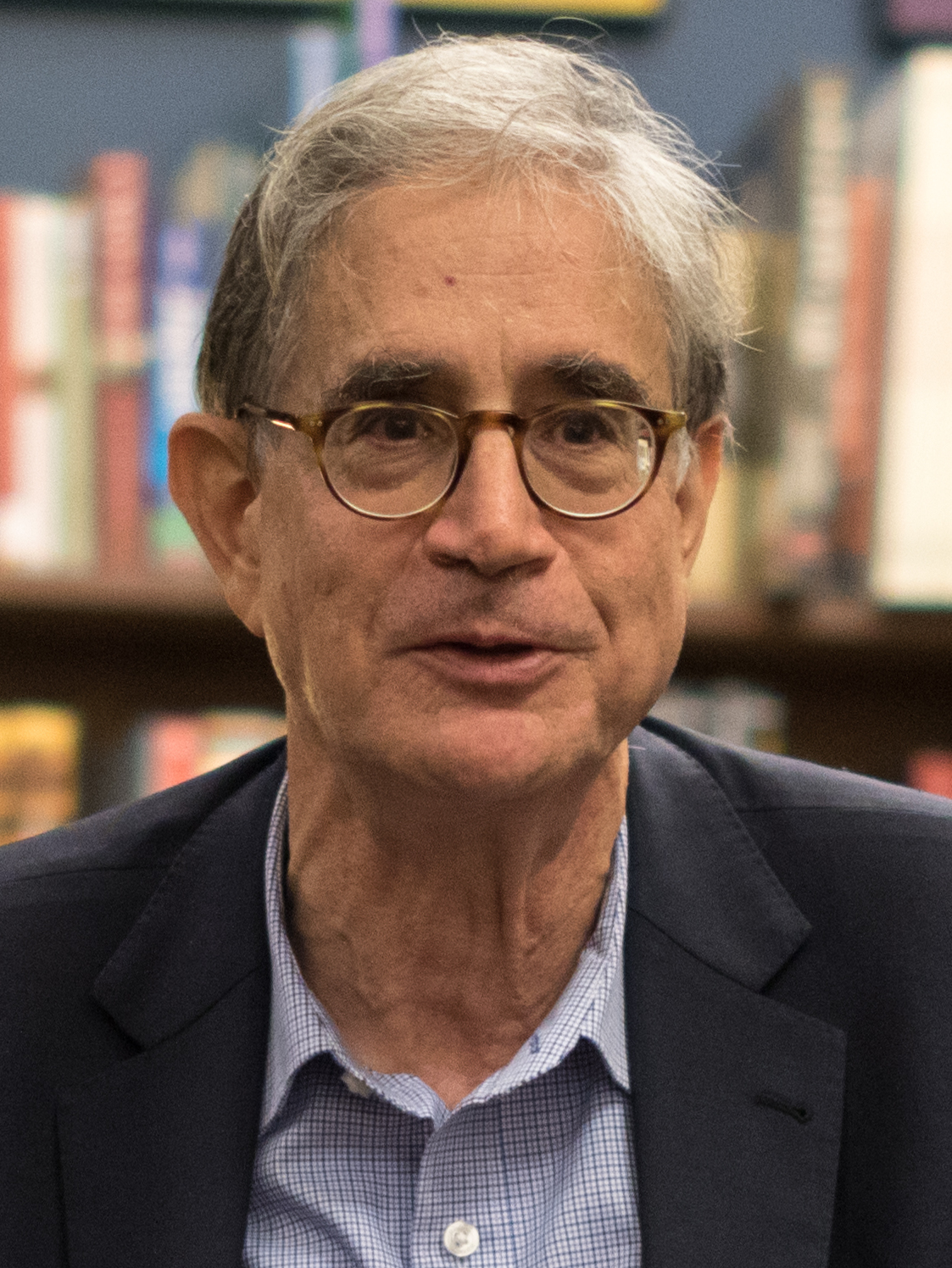
- Freedman in 2016
- Born: Paul Harris Freedman; September 15, 1949 (age 77); New York City, U.S.
- Title: Chester D. Tripp Professor of History
- Awards: Haskins Medal; Otto Gründler Prize; American Academy of Arts & Sciences (2010); Guggenheim Fellowship

Academic background
- Education: University of California, Santa Cruz (BA); University of California, Berkeley (MLS, PhD)
- Thesis: The Diocese of Vic: Tradition and Regeneration in Medieval Catalonia (1983)
- Influences: Peter Kenez

Academic work
- Discipline: Medieval studies
- Institutions: University of California, Davis; Vanderbilt University; Institute for Advanced Study; Yale University
- Main interests: Food history

Paul Harris Freedman (born September 15, 1949) is an American historian and medievalist who serves as the Chester D. Tripp Professor of History at Yale University. Freedman specializes in medieval social history, the history of Catalonia, the study of medieval peasantry, and the history of American cuisine.

Freedman is the author of more than 10 books and 40 academic papers having been published by the universities of Princeton, Yale, Harvard, Cambridge, Toronto, and Bologna, among others. He wrote extensively on the history of the Middle Ages during his career as a historian though he has recently shifted to culinary history.

His 1999 book Images of the Medieval Peasant won the Medieval Academy's Haskins Medal and the Otto Gründler Prize of the Medieval Institute at Western Michigan University.

== Early life and education ==
Freedman was born in New York City to a Jewish family; his father was a doctor and his mother was an economist. He attended the Walden School, matriculating at the University of California, Santa Cruz, in Merrill College where he studied under Peter Kenez. Freedman also spent time at Barcelona, Spain, and in Indonesia studying the local culture in college before moving on to earn his Doctor of Philosophy at the University of California, Berkeley. Upon earning his doctorate, Freedman taught history briefly for one year at the University of California, Davis.

== Academic career ==
Upon receiving a doctorate in history at Berkeley in 1978, he then taught for 18 years at Vanderbilt University before joining the faculty of Yale University in 1997. Freedman was a member of the Institute for Advanced Study in Princeton, New Jersey, from 1986 until 1987 and was elected to the American Philosophical Society in 2011. He served as the director of the Robert Penn Warren Center for the Humanities at Vanderbilt University from 1993 to 1997 and was chair of the Department of History at Yale University from 2004 until 2007. Freedman also currently serves as a member on the editorial board of Speculum at the University of Chicago and the American Academy of Arts & Sciences.

== Bibliography ==
- The Diocese of Vic: Tradition and Regeneration in Medieval Catalonia, 1983
- The Origins of Peasant Servitude in Medieval Catalonia, 1991
- Images of the Medieval Peasant, 1999
- Food: The History of Taste (ed.), 2007
- Out of the East: Spices and the Medieval Imagination, 2008
- Ten Restaurants That Changed America, 2016
- American Cuisine: And How It Got That Way, 2019
- Why Food Matters, 2021

== Lectures ==
- (video) HIST 210: The Early Middle Ages, 284–1000 (Fall 2011), by Paul H. Freedman at Open Yale Courses.
