= Barbara Newman =

American medievalist, literary critic, religious historian and author

- Born: Barbara Jane Newman; August 14, 1953 (age 73)
- Occupation: Medievalist
- Title: Professor of English, Religious Studies, & Classics; John Evans Professor of Latin
- Awards: Charles Homer Haskins Medal (2009)

Academic background
- Education: Yale University (Ph.D)

Academic work
- Institutions: Northwestern University
- Main interests: Medieval religious culture, saints' lives, and women's writing
- Notable works: God and the Goddesses: Vision, Poetry, and Belief in the Middle Ages (2003); Sister of Wisdom: St. Hildegard's Theology of the Feminine (1987)

Barbara Jane Newman (born August 14, 1953) is an American medievalist, literary critic, religious historian, and author. She is Professor of English and Religion, and John Evans Professor of Latin, at Northwestern University. Newman was elected in 2017 to the American Philosophical Society.

== Education and career ==
Newman was raised near Chicago, Illinois. After an undergraduate education at Oberlin College and graduate work at the University of Chicago, she began her scholarly career with a 1981 dissertation at Yale on Hildegard of Bingen.

She has written on issues of gender and identity in a broad range of literary and theological texts, as well as translating important works from Latin, French, and Middle High German. Her scholarship has explored figures such as Julian of Norwich, Heloise and Abelard, Thomas of Cantimpré, Mechthild of Hackeborn, Marguerite Porete, Henry Suso, and Guillaume de Lorris. She has been described as "one of the finest Hildegard scholars". Her 2003 book, God and the Goddesses: Vision, Poetry, and Belief in the Middle Ages suggested that medieval Christianity included multiple female figures, "distinctive creations of the Christian imagination", who deepened the medieval vision of God. Her book was praised in Speculum as a "provocatively and eloquently written study" in which "Newman has directed her lifelong passion for the feminine in medieval Christian literature toward a finely tuned reading of female figures" as Goddesses; Caroline Walker Bynum wrote that when "we look back fifty years from now, we will see this book as one that changed the face of scholarship and maybe even our understanding of Christianity itself." In 2006 Newman published a study and translation of the Song of Songs or Marienleich of Heinrich Frauenlob, which was described in The Times Literary Supplement as being "a gorgeous publication, clearly and forcefully written, stunningly laid out and carefully edited." In 2015 she was elected to a one-year term as President of the Medieval Academy of America.

== Awards ==
Newman was elected a Fellow of the Medieval Academy of America in 1999 and was electedin 2005 to the American Academy of Arts and Sciences In 2008 she was awarded an Andrew W. Mellon Foundation Distinguished Achievement Award, currently the most valuable award in the humanities. In 2009 she was awarded the Charles Homer Haskins Medal by the Medieval Academy of America, for God and the Goddesses. Her research has been supported by the National Endowment for the Humanities, the Rockefeller Foundation, and the Guggenheim Foundation. Medieval Crossover: Reading the Secular against the Sacred (2014) has been named a Choice Outstanding Academic Book for 2014. In 2023, Brepols published a festschrift in her honor entitled Mystics, Goddesses, Lovers, and Teachers: Medieval Visions and their Legacies. Studies in Honour of Barbara Newman.

== Works ==
- Sister of Wisdom: St. Hildegard's Theology of the Feminine (1987) ISBN 0-520-92018-X
- From Virile Woman to WomanChrist: Studies in Medieval Religion and Literature (1995) ISBN 0-8122-0026-8
- Symphonia: A Critical Edition of the Symphonia Armonie Celestium Revelationum (1998)
- God and the Goddesses: Vision, Poetry, and Belief in the Middle Ages (2003) ISBN 0-8122-0291-0
- Frauenlob's Song of Songs: A Medieval German Poet and His Masterpiece (2006) ISBN 0-271-04560-4
- Thomas of Cantimpré: The Collected Saints' Lives: Abbot John of Cantimpré, Christina the Astonishing, Margaret of Ypres, and Lutgard of Aywières (2008)
- Medieval Crossover: Reading the Secular Against the Sacred (2013) ISBN 0-268-03611-X
- Making Love in the Twelfth Century: "Letters of Two Lovers" in Context (2016)
- Mechthild of Hackeborn and the Nuns of Helfta: The Book of Special Grace (2017)
- The Works of Richard Methley (2021)
- The Permeable Self: Five Medieval Relationships (2021)
