= Haskins Medal =

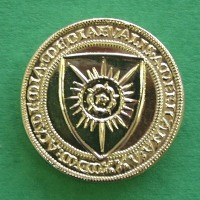
- Awarded for: Production of a distinguished book in medieval studies
- Country: United States
- Presented by: Medieval Academy of America
- First award: 1940
- Currently held by: Leah DeVun

The Haskins Medal is an annual medal awarded by the Medieval Academy of America. It is awarded for the production of a distinguished book in the field of medieval studies.

== Award ==
The Haskins Medal is awarded by a committee of three; a chairman, and two members appointed by the president of the Medieval Academy of America, on a three-year rotating term. The presentation of the medal is announced each spring at the annual meeting of the academy. Graham Carey designed the Haskins Medal in 1939, and each one has the name of the recipient and the date engraved on the edge. The medal was first awarded in 1940, and is presented in honor of the medieval historian Charles Homer Haskins, the founder and second president of the academy.

== List of medalists ==
Haskins Medal recipients:

- 1940: Bertha Haven Putnam, Proceedings Before the Justices of the Peace in the Fourteenth and Fifteenth Centuries, Edward III to Richard III. London: Spottiswoode, Ballantyne and Co., 1938.
- 1941: William E. Lunt, Financial Relations of the Papacy with England to 1327. Cambridge, Massachusetts: Mediaeval Academy of America, 1939.
- 1942: John M. Manly and Edith Rickert, The Text of the Canterbury Tales Studied on the Basis of All Known Manuscripts. 8 vols. Chicago: University of Chicago Press, 1940.
- 1943: Donald Drew Egbert, The Tickhill Psalter and Related Manuscripts. New York: New York Public Library, 1940.
- 1944: No award.
- 1945: George E. Woodbine, Bracton, De Legibus et Consuetudinibus Angliae. Vol. 4. New Haven: Yale University Press, 1942.
- 1946: Jonathan Burke Severs, The Literary Relationships of Chaucer's Clerk’s Tale. New Haven: Yale University Press, 1942.
- 1947: No award.
- 1948: No award.
- 1949: George Sarton, Introduction to the History of Science. 3: Science and Learning in the Fourteenth Century. Baltimore: The Carnegie Institution, 1948.
- 1950: Raymond de Roover, Money, Banking and Credit in Mediaeval Bruges. Cambridge, Massachusetts: Mediaeval Academy of America, 1948.
- 1951: Roger Sherman Loomis, Arthurian Tradition and Chrétien de Troyes. New York: Columbia University Press, 1949.
- 1952: Alexander A. Vasiliev, Justin the First: An Introduction to the Epoch of Justinian the Great. Cambridge, Massachusetts: Harvard University Press, 1950.
- 1953: Millard Meiss, Painting in Florence and Siena After the Black Death. Princeton: Princeton University Press, 1951.
- 1954: No award.
- 1955: George H. Forsyth Jr., The Church of St. Martin at Angers: The Architectural History of the Site from the Roman Empire to the French Revolution. Princeton: Princeton University Press, 1953.
- 1956: Ernest A. Moody, Truth and Consequence in Mediaeval Logic. Amsterdam: North-Holland Publishing Co., 1953.
- 1957: Elias Avery Lowe, Codices Latini Antiquiores: A Palaeographical Guide to Latin Manuscripts Prior to the Ninth Century. Vols. 1–7. Oxford: Clarendon Press, 1934–56.
- 1958: Ernest Hatch Wilkins, Studies in the Life and Works of Petrarch. Cambridge, Massachusetts: Mediaeval Academy of America, 1955.
- 1959: Ernst H. Kantorowicz, The King’s Two Bodies: A Study in Mediaeval Political Theology. Princeton: Princeton University Press, 1957.
- 1960: Francis Dvornik, The Idea of Apostolicity in Byzantium and the Legend of the Apostle Andrew. Cambridge, Massachusetts: Harvard University Press, 1958.
- 1961: Gerhart B. Ladner, The Idea of Reform: Its Impact on Christian Thought and Action in the Age of the Fathers. Cambridge, Massachusetts: Harvard University Press, 1959.
- 1962: Erwin Panofsky, Renaissance and Renascences in Western Art. Stockholm: Almqvist and Wiksell, 1960.
- 1963: Paul Frankl, The Gothic: Literary Sources and Interpretations Through Eight Centuries. Princeton: Princeton University Press, 1960.
- 1964: Pearl Kibre, Scholarly Privileges in the Middle Ages: The Rights, Privileges, and Immunities of Scholars and Universities at Bologna, Padua, Paris, and Oxford. Cambridge, Massachusetts: Mediaeval Academy of America, 1962.
- 1965: Morton W. Bloomfield, Piers Plowman as a Fourteenth-Century Apocalypse. New Brunswick: Rutgers University Press, 1962.
- 1966: Gaines Post, Studies in Medieval Legal Thought, Public Law and the State, 1100–1322. Princeton: Princeton University Press, 1964.
- 1967: O. B. Hardison Jr., Christian Rite and Christian Drama in the Middle Ages: Essays in the Origin and Early History of Modern Drama. Baltimore: Johns Hopkins University Press, 1965.
- 1968: Marshall Clagett, Archimedes in the Middle Ages. 1: The Arabo-Latin Tradition. Madison: University of Wisconsin Press, 1964.
- 1969: Giles Constable, The Letters of Peter the Venerable. 2 vols. Cambridge, Massachusetts: Harvard University Press, 1967.
- 1970: Robert Brentano, Two Churches: England and Italy in the Thirteenth Century. Berkeley: University of California Press, 1968.
- 1971: S. Harrison Thomson, Latin Bookhands of the Later Middle Ages, 1100–1500. Cambridge, Eng.: Cambridge University Press, 1969.
- 1972: Kenneth J. Conant, Cluny: Les églises et la maison du chef d’ordre. Cambridge, Massachusetts: Mediaeval Academy of America, 1968.
- 1973: S. D. Goitein, A Mediterranean Society: The Jewish Communities of the Arab World as Portrayed in the Documents of the Cairo Geniza. 1: Economic Foundations. 2: The Community. Berkeley: University of California Press, 1967, 1971.
- 1974: Kurt Weitzmann, Studies in Classical and Byzantine Manuscript Illumination. Chicago: University of Chicago Press, 1971.
- 1975: Speros Vryonis Jr., The Decline of Medieval Hellenism in Asia Minor and the Process of Islamization from the Eleventh Through the Fifteenth Century. Berkeley: University of California Press, 1971.
- 1976: Robert I. Burns, Islam Under the Crusaders: Colonial Survival in the Thirteenth-Century Kingdom of Valencia. Princeton: Princeton University Press, 1973.
- 1977: Charles S. Singleton, Decameron: Edizione diplomatico-interpretativa dell’autografo Hamilton 90. Baltimore: Johns Hopkins University Press, 1974.
- 1978: George Kane and E. Talbot Donaldson, Piers Plowman: The B Version. Will’s Vision of Piers Plowman, Do-Well, Do-Better and Do-Best. London: Athlone Press, 1975.
- 1979: George P. Cuttino, Gascon Register A (Series of 1318–1319). Edited with J.-P. Trabut-Cussac. 3 vols. London: Oxford University Press, 1975, 1976.
- 1980: Kenneth M. Setton, The Papacy and the Levant (1204–1571). 2 vols. Philadelphia: American Philosophical Society, 1976, 1978.
- 1981: No award.
- 1982: Richard Krautheimer, Rome, A Profile of a City, 312–1308. Princeton: Princeton University Press, 1980.
- 1983: Jean Bony, The English Decorated Style: Gothic Architecture Transformed, 1250–1350. Oxford: Phaidon Press, 1979.
- 1984: Stanley B. Greenfield and Fred C. Robinson, A Bibliography of Publications on Old English Literature to the End of 1972. Toronto: University of Toronto Press, 1980.
- 1985: Jaroslav Pelikan, The Christian Tradition: A History of the Development of Doctrine. 3: The Growth of Medieval Theology (600-1300). 4: Reformation of Church and Dogma (1300-1700). Chicago: University of Chicago Press, 1978, 1984.
- 1986: William Roach, The Continuations of the Old French "Perceval" of Chrétien de Troyes. 5: The Third Continuation by Manessier. Philadelphia: American Philosophical Society, 1983.
- 1987: Joseph R. Strayer, The Reign of Philip the Fair. Princeton: Princeton University Press, 1980.
- 1988: Herbert Bloch, Monte Cassino in the Middle Ages. Rome: Edizioni di Storia e Letteratura; Cambridge, Massachusetts: Harvard University Press, 1986.
- 1989: Thomas N. Bisson, Fiscal Accounts of Catalonia Under the Early Count-Kings (1151–1213). 2 vols. Berkeley: University of California Press, 1984.
- 1990: John W. Baldwin, The Government of Philip Augustus: Foundations of French Royal Power in the Middle Ages. Berkeley: University of California Press, 1986.
- 1991: Walter Goffart, The Narrators of Barbarian History (A.D. 550-800): Jordanes, Gregory of Tours, Bede, and Paul the Deacon. Princeton: Princeton University Press, 1988.
- 1992: Paul Oskar Kristeller, Iter Italicum: A Finding List of Uncatalogued or Incompletely Catalogued Humanistic Manuscripts of the Renaissance in Italian and Other Libraries. Vols. 4 and 5. London: The Warburg Institute; Leiden: E. J. Brill, 1989, 1990.
- 1993: Madeline H. Caviness, Sumptuous Arts at the Royal Abbeys in Reims and Braine: Ornatus elegantiae, varietate stupendes. Princeton: Princeton University Press, 1990.
- 1994: Karl F. Morrison, Understanding Conversion. Charlottesville: University Press of Virginia, 1992.
- 1995: J. N. Hillgarth, Readers and Books in Majorca, 1229–1550. Paris: C.N.R.S., 1991.
- 1996: Siegfried Wenzel, Macaronic Sermons: Bilingualism and Preaching in Late-Medieval England. Ann Arbor: University of Michigan Press, 1994.
- 1997: Robert Deshman, The Benedictional of Æthelwold. Princeton: Princeton University Press, 1995.
- 1998: Marcia L. Colish, Peter Lombard. 2 vols. Leiden: E. J. Brill, 1994.
- 1999: Jaroslav Folda, The Art of the Crusaders in the Holy Land, 1098-1187. Cambridge, Eng.: Cambridge University Press, 1995.
- 2000: William Chester Jordan, The Great Famine: Northern Europe in the Early Fourteenth Century. Princeton, N.J.: Princeton University Press, 1996.
- 2001: Brian Tierney, The Idea of Natural Rights: Studies on Natural Rights, Natural Law and Church Law, 1150–1625. Atlanta: Scholars Press, 1997.
- 2002: Paul Freedman, Images of the Medieval Peasant. Stanford University Press, 1999.
- 2003: Mary J. Carruthers, The Craft of Thought: Meditation, Rhetoric, and the Making of Images, 400 - 1200. Cambridge, Eng.: Cambridge University Press, 1998.
- 2004: Peter Fergusson and Stuart Harrison, Rievaulx Abbey: Community, Architecture, Memory. New Haven, Conn.: Yale University Press, 1999.
- 2005: Michael McCormick, Origins of the European Economy: Communications and Commerce, A.D. 300-900, Cambridge: Cambridge University Press, 2001.
- 2006: Anne Walters Robertson, Guillaume de Machaut and Reims: Context and Meaning in His Musical Works, Cambridge: Cambridge University Press, 2002.
- 2007: Thomas F. Madden, Enrico Dandolo and the Rise of Venice, Baltimore, MD: Johns Hopkins University Press, 2003.
- 2008: Charles B. McClendon, The Origins of Medieval Architecture: Building in Europe, A.D. 600-900, New Haven, CT: Yale University Press, 2005.
- 2009: Barbara Newman, God and the Goddesses: Vision, Poetry, and Belief in the Middle Ages, University of Pennsylvania Press, 2003.
- 2010: Kathryn Kerby-Fulton, Books Under Suspicion: Censorship and Tolerance of Revelatory Writing in Late Medieval England, University of Notre Dame Press, 2006.
- 2011: Caroline Walker Bynum, Wonderful Blood: Theology and Practice in Late Medieval Northern Germany and Beyond, University of Pennsylvania Press, 2007.
- 2012: Richard William Pfaff, The Liturgy in Medieval England: A History, Cambridge University Press, 2009.
- 2013: John Van Engen, Sisters and Brothers of the Common Life: The Devotio Moderna and the World of the Later Middle Ages, University of Pennsylvania Press, 2008.
- 2014: Ronald G. Witt, The Two Latin Cultures and the Foundation of Renaissance Humanism in Medieval Italy, Cambridge University Press, 2012.
- 2015: Charles Atkinson, The Critical Nexus: Tone-system, Mode, and Notation in Early Medieval Music, Oxford University Press, 2008.
- 2016: Francis Oakley, The Emergence of Western Political Thought in the Latin Middle Ages, 3 vols., Yale University Press, 2010-2015.
- 2017: Joel Kaye, A History of Balance, 1250–1375. The Emergence of a New Model of Equilibrium and Its Impact on Thought, Cambridge University Press, 2014.
- 2018: Brian A. Catlos, Muslims of Medieval Latin Christendom, c. 1050–1614, Cambridge University Press, 2015.
- 2019: Philip L. Reynolds, How Marriage Became One of the Sacraments: The Sacramental Theology of Marriage from Its Medieval Origins to the Council of Trent. Cambridge: Cambridge University Press, 2017.
- 2020: Richard Firth Green, Elf Queens and Holy Friars: Fairy Beliefs and the Medieval Church. Philadelphia: University of Pennsylvania Press, 2016.
- 2021: Robert Ousterhout, Eastern Medieval Architecture: The Building Traditions of Byzantium and Neighboring Lands, Oxford University Press, 2019.
- 2022: Marina Rustow, The Lost Archive: Traces of a Caliphate in a Cairo Synagogue, Princeton: Princeton University Press, 2020.
- 2023: Dyan Elliott, The Corrupter of Boys: Sodomy, Scandal, and the Medieval Clergy, Philadelphia: University of Pennsylvania Press, 2020.
- 2024: Leah DeVun, The Shape of Sex: Nonbinary Gender from Genesis to the Renaissance, New York: Columbia University Press, 2021.
- 2025: Rita Copeland, Emotion and the History of Rhetoric in the Middle Ages, Oxford University Press, 2021.
