= Morton W. Bloomfield =

American Medievalist

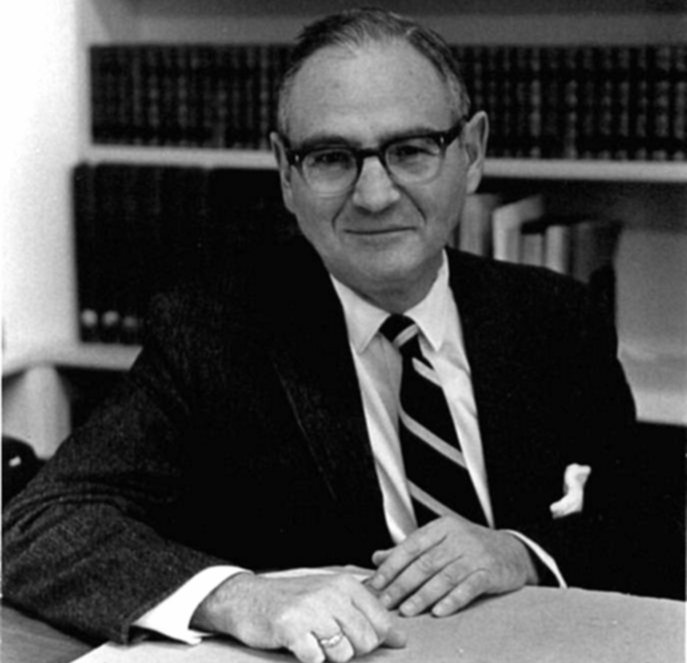
Morton W. Bloomfield, Warren House, Harvard University c.1970

Morton Wilfred Bloomfield (May 19, 1913 – April 14, 1987) was an American medievalist. He was the Arthur Kingsley Porter Professor of English at Harvard University. He is best known for his scholarly work, teaching and mentoring on Medieval literature, language, as well as contributions to intellectual history, literary criticism and theory. He also was one of the founders of the first U.S. national center for the humanities, the National Humanities Center.

== Life and career ==
Born in Montreal, Quebec, Canada, Bloomfield received a B.A. (1934) and M.A. (1935) from McGill University and a Ph.D. (1938) from the University of Wisconsin.

During World War II (1942–45), he worked in MIRS (Military Intelligence Research Section) and conducted order-of-battle research at the Pentagon and in London for which he was decorated with a Bronze Star Medal (1946). Notably, he also taught German officers (POWs waiting to be released) English literature at the end of the war.

In 1961, Bloomfield was appointed to the faculty of Harvard University after holding positions at the University of Wisconsin, the University of Akron, New York University (serving as the Berg Professor of English from 1955 to 1956), and, from 1946 to 1961, at Ohio State University. In 1971, he was appointed Arthur Kingsley Porter Professor of English. He chaired the Harvard English department from 1968 to 1972. He became emeritus in 1983 and fully retired in 1986. After his retirement, he taught and lectured at various institutions, most notably as Distinguished Visiting professor of English at Stanford University in 1986.

== Bloomfield Lecture and Fellowship ==
In 1987 the Morton W. Bloomfield Lecture/Visiting Fellowship fund was endowed in the Harvard English Department to bring in scholars from around the world to study, develop and present current work on a wide range of topics related to medieval studies. Recent holders of the Morton Bloomfield Fellowship include Susanna Fein (2009–10), Tara Williams, Laura Ashe (2015–16), Ad Putter (2017–18), Anthony Bale (2018–19), and Sebastian Sobecki (2022–23).

== Major works ==
Over a 50-year career, Bloomfield published over 200 articles and books on medieval literature, language, literary criticism/theory, the history of ideas and wisdom literature. His major works included The Seven Deadly Sins: An Introduction to the History of a Religious Concept (1952); Piers Plowman as a Fourteenth Century Apocalypse (1961); with Leonard Newmark A Linguistic Introduction to the History of English (1963); Essays and Explorations: Studies in Language and Literature (1970); Incipits of Latin Works on the Virtues and Vices, 1110-1500 (1979); and, posthumously, with Charles W. Dunn The Role of the Poet in Early Societies (1989). In 1993 Elizabeth Walsh and Susie M. Barretta edited a collection of his essays from the last 17 years of his life and published them as The Light of Learning.

== National Humanities Center ==
With his colleague Gregory Vlastos, Bloomfield conceptualized and laid the groundwork for the establishment of the National Humanities Center in Research Triangle Park, a private, nonprofit organization, and "the only independent institute dedicated exclusively to advanced study in all areas of the humanities." He served as chairman of the center's Board of Trustees from 1973 to 1976.

== Honors and awards ==
Called "one of the truly great medieval scholars" of his generation and "one of the glories of the Harvard English department," Bloomfield was twice awarded a Guggenheim Fellowship (1949; 1964); was a member of the American Academy of Arts and Sciences (1963); a Fellow of the Medieval Academy of America (1967); a corresponding fellow of the British Academy (1975); a member of the American Philosophical Society (1981); and served on the executive committee of the Modern Language Association during a turbulent time in academia (1966–69).

In 1965, Bloomfield, being recognized for his book on Piers Plowman and his contributions to medieval studies, was awarded the Medieval Academy of America's Charles Homer Haskins Medal; and in 1976 he was elected president of the Medieval Academy of America.

Bloomfield also received honorary degrees from Western Michigan University (1982), Binghamton University (1986) and Bar-Ilan University (1986).

He was a fellow at the Center for Advanced Study in the Behavioral Sciences at Stanford (1967–68); a member of IAUPE (International Association of University Professors of English); and a Scholar at the Institute for Advanced Study in Princeton, New Jersey (1972).

In honor of his career and becoming emeritus, Larry Benson and Siegfried Wenzel in 1982 edited a festschrift for Bloomfield, The Wisdom of Poetry.

== Selected publications ==
Title	Publication	Publication Date	George H. Brown's Publications' List#
"Personification Metaphors"	Directions in Medieval Literary Criticism	1979-1980	200
"Recent Scholarship on Joachim of Fiore and his Influence"	Prophecy and Millernarianism	1980	199
"Episodic Juxtaposition or the Syntax of Episodes in Narration"	Studies in English Linguistics for Randolph Quirk	1980	196
"The Wisdom of the Nun's Priest's Tale"	Chaucerian Problems and Perspectives; Essays Presented to Paul E. Beichner	1979	190
"Continuities and Discontinuities"	Medieval Literature and Contemporary Theory	1978-1979	182
"Stylistics and the Theory of Literature"	NLH7	1975-1976	156
"The Study of Language"	Daedalus	Summer 1973	129
"The Interpretation of Narrative: Theory and Practice"	Harvard English Studies 1	1970	103
"The Gloomy Chaucer"	Veins of Humor, Harvard English Studies 3	1972	119
"Allegory as Interpretation"	NLH3	1971-1972	116
"Judaism and the Study of Literature"	Tradition 12	1971	114

== Personal life ==
Bloomfield married Caroline Lichtenberg in 1952. Caroline died in 2020. He is survived by their three children, Micah, Hanna and Sam. To date, his additional descendants are seven grandchildren and five great-grandchildren.

[1] Harvard Scholars in English 1890 – 1990, (1991), p. 117
