= Ernst Kitzinger =

American art historian (1912–2003)

Ernst Kitzinger FBA
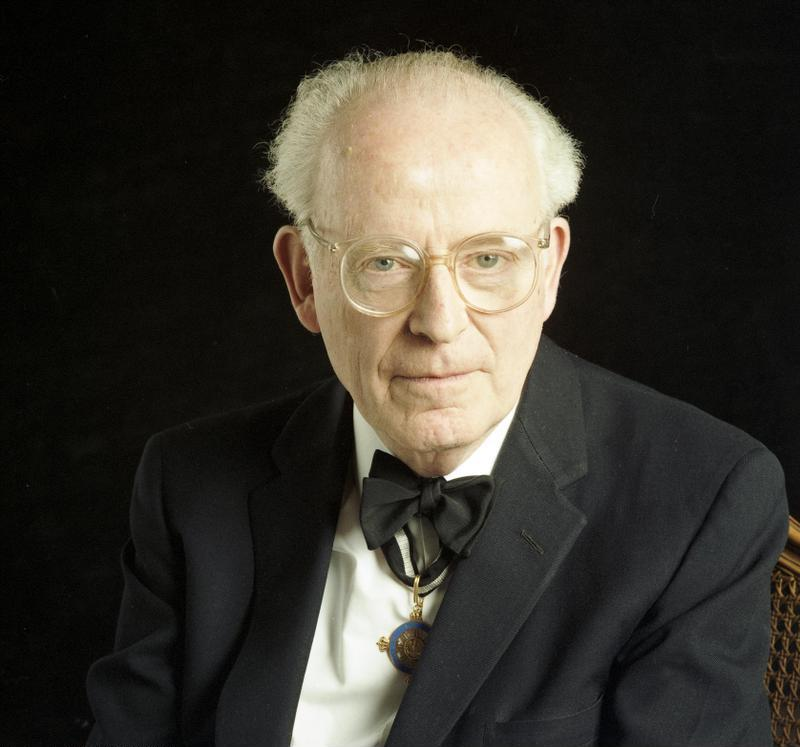
- Kitzinger in 1998
- Born: December 27, 1912; Munich, German Empire
- Died: January 22, 2003 (aged 90); Poughkeepsie, New York, U.S.
- Known for: Early Medieval Art in the British Museum (1940)
- Spouse: Margaret Susan Theobald (m. 1944)
- Relatives: Richard Krautheimer
- Awards: American Academy of Arts and Sciences (1961); American Philosophical Society (1967); Pour le Mérite (1982); Austrian Decoration for Science and Art (1991)

Academic background
- Education: Ludwig-Maximilians-Universität München; Sapienza University of Rome
- Influences: Wilhelm Pinder; T. D. Kendrick

Academic work
- Discipline: Medieval art
- Institutions: British Museum: Harvard University; Dumbarton Oaks; Institute for Advanced Study
- Notable students: Hans Belting; Madeline Caviness

Ernst Kitzinger FBA (December 27, 1912 – January 22, 2003) was a German-American historian of late antique, early medieval, and Byzantine art.

== Early life and education ==
Kitzinger was born into a well-educated Jewish family in Munich; his father, Wilhelm Nathan Kitzinger, was a prominent lawyer; his mother, Elisabeth Kitzinger, née Merzbacher, was a pioneering social worker involved with child welfare among Eastern European Jewish refugee and immigrant families. Kitzinger entered the Ludwig-Maximilians-Universität München in 1931, where he studied the history of art, principally under Wilhelm Pinder. From the summer of 1931 on, Kitzinger spent significant time in Rome, enrolled in the Sapienza University of Rome and intellectually centered at the Bibliotheca Hertziana. (Kitzinger's distant relation, Richard Krautheimer [1897–1994], who also became a major art historian, of late antique and Byzantine architecture, was coincidentally doing research at the Hertziana at the same time.) The beginning of the Nazi regime in 1933 raised the immediate possibility that Jewish students might be banned from receiving degrees. Kitzinger accordingly completed his dissertation, a brief but influential study of Roman painting in the 7th and 8th centuries, with exceptional speed, and defended it in the fall of 1934. He left Germany the day after his thesis defense.

Kitzinger first returned to Rome, before moving on to England, where he found volunteer employment at the British Museum while eking out a living doing casual academic work, writing book reviews, and receiving the occasional small grant. Among a wide range of art historical interests, he quickly developed a particular focus on Anglo-Saxon art through being enlisted by T. D. Kendrick to assist in a comprehensive survey of surviving pre-Norman stone sculpture in England. Kitzinger's first published article was on Anglo-Saxon vinescroll ornament; he also contributed to the assessment of the treasures of the Sutton Hoo Ship Burial as it was unearthed over months in 1939. In 1937, on a modest grant from a patron of the British Museum, he travelled to Egypt and Istanbul, further widening his perspective on late antique and early medieval art as an "international" phenomenon. It was this perspective that he brought to his first book, Early Medieval Art in the British Museum (1940). Ostensibly a guidebook, this was in fact an attempt to trace the transformation of classical art into medieval, a subject which Kitzinger would revisit on many occasions throughout his career. The book has never gone out of print; more recent editions are just called Early Medieval Art.

=== World War II ===
Kitzinger, although he had left Germany because he was Jewish, was interned in 1940 as an "enemy alien" (having German nationality and background) with many others in similar circumstances. He was transported to Australia in a perilous and fraught sea voyage on HMT Dunera. Though he received an official release immediately upon arrival at an internment camp in Hay, New South Wales (through the intervention of the Warburg Institute), he was stranded there for nine months. He did succeed in putting the time on the voyage and in the camp to valuable use, though, acquiring a working knowledge of Russian from a fellow internee.

== Academic career ==
In 1941 Kitzinger managed, with some difficulty, to travel to Washington, D.C., where he became a Junior Fellow at Dumbarton Oaks, which had in 1940 been donated as a research library to Harvard University. Once there, Kitzinger was assigned by Wilhelm Koehler to a systematic study of the Byzantine monuments of the Balkans (leading to an important article on the monuments of Stobi in 1946). Several years later, after a wartime stint with the OSS in Washington, London, and eventually Paris, Kitzinger began work on a complete survey of the mosaics of Norman Sicily. This project would occupy him for the rest of his life, resulting first in The Mosaics of the Capella Palatina in Palermo: An Essay on the Choice and Arrangement of Subjects [Art Bulletin 31 (1949): 269–292] and The Mosaics of Monreale [Palermo: S. F. Flaccovio Editore (1960) (republished, 1991, with a new preface, Italian only)] and later in The Mosaics of St. Mary's of the Admiral in Palermo [Washington, D.C.: Dumbarton Oaks Studies (1990)] and the publication of a six-volume corpus of photographs of the mosaics, I mosaici del periodo normanno in Sicilia (1992–1995).

Kitzinger quickly advanced through the ranks at Dumbarton Oaks, becoming an assistant professor in 1946, associate professor in 1951, director of studies in 1955, and professor of Byzantine art and archaeology in 1956. As director of studies he firmly established Dumbarton Oaks as an academic institution of international renown and the world's leading institution for Byzantine studies.

Kitzinger resigned as director of studies at Dumbarton Oaks in 1966, in part to rebalance his work as a scholar after eleven years of heavy administrative duties. During those years, he had occasionally taught courses at Harvard's Cambridge campus, and in 1967, after an interlude at the Institute for Advanced Study at Princeton, he moved to Harvard permanently, accepting a position as the Arthur Kingsley Porter University Professor, which he held until his retirement in 1979. At Harvard Kitzinger supervised eighteen doctoral dissertations. Among his distinguished students over his years of teaching and mentoring are Hans Belting, Madeline Caviness, Joseph Connors, Anna Gonosova, Christine Kondoleon, Irving Lavin, Henry Maguire, John Mitchell, Lawrence Nees, Nancy Netzer, Natasha Staller, James Trilling, Rebecca Corrie, and William Tronzo.

The major theoretical contributions of Kitzinger's later career are embodied in his book Byzantine art in the making (1977), which is based on the Slade Lectures he delivered at the University of Cambridge in 1974–1975, and in two collections of essays: a single volume published by Indiana U. Press in 1976 as The Art of Byzantium and the Medieval West, and a two-volume set edited by John Mitchell and published by Pindar Press in 2002 and 2004: Studies in Late Antique, Byzantine and Medieval Western Art. Kitzinger maintained his lifelong preoccupation with the analysis of style change in late antique and early medieval art, and his conviction that stylistic analysis could speak with an authority equal to that of iconography or textual history. To this end he developed a theory of "modes," according to which certain styles were appropriate to the depiction of certain subjects. In Byzantine art in the making, furthermore, he essayed a bold attempt to trace the stylistic "dialectic" of the period in question:

At certain times and in certain places bold stabs were made in the direction of new, unclassical forms, only to be followed by reactions, retrospective movements and revivals. In some contexts such developments - in either direction - took place slowly, hestitantly, and by steps so small as to be almost imperceptible. In addition there were extraordinary attempts at synthesis, at reconciling conflicting aesthetic ideals. Out of this complex dialectic, medieval form emerged.

The totality of Kitzinger's work was enormously influential in making Byzantine art a field of art historical study. And, though art historical methodology based on stylistic analysis largely fell out of fashion in the 1980s and 1990s, and Byzantine Art in the Making has been described as the last gasp of Viennese-style formalist art history on the model of Aloïs Riegl and Josef Strzygowski, many aspects of Kitzinger's methodology may be described as prescient. Kitzinger anticipated contemporary concerns of the field in his emphasis on the centrality of art to cult in much-cited works such as "The Cult of Images in the Age Before Iconoclasm" (1954); in his interest in questions of meaning in ornament (e.g., "Interlace and Icons" [1993]) and significance in the position of images (e.g., "A Pair of Silver Bookcovers in the Sion Treasure" [1974]); and in his sustained work on the relationship between art of the Greek and Latin worlds. Furthermore, it has been argued that "when the pendulum of fashion swings back again, [Kitzinger's] works will undoubtedly be central to a reconsideration of style.".

== Personal life ==
In 1944, Kitzinger married Margaret Susan Theobald, an English artist, whom he met through Otto Demus in 1939. They had a daughter and two sons. Kitzinger died in Poughkeepsie, New York in 2003, at age 90.

== Memberships and Honors ==
- Fellow of the German Archaeological Institute (1953)
- American Academy of Arts and Sciences (1961)
- American Philosophical Society (1967)
- D.Litt. of Swarthmore College (1969)
- National Academy of Sciences, Letters and Arts (Palermo, 1969)
- Corresponding Fellow of the British Academy (1969)
- Corresponding Member of the Bavarian Academy of Sciences (1970)
- Hon. Fellow of the Society of Antiquaries of London (1975)
- Corresponding Member of the Academy of Sciences and Literature, Mainz (1980)
- Pour le Mérite for Science and Art (1982)
- Corresponding Member, Austrian Academy of Sciences (1983)
- D.Litt. of the University of Warwick (1989)
- Austrian Decoration of Honour for Science and Art (1991) (Oesterreichisches Ehrenzeichen für Wissenschaft und Kunst)
- D.Litt. of the University of Rome "La Sapienza" (1992)

== Publications ==
A partial list:

Romische Malerei vom Beginn des 7. bis zur Mitte des 8. Jahrhunderts. Munich, 1936 (dissertation).
"Anglo-Saxon Vinescroll Ornament." Antiquity 10 (1936): 67–71.
"Notes on Early Coptic Sculpture." Archaeologia 87 (1938): 181–215.
"The Sutton Hoo Finds: The Silver," British Museum Quarterly 13 (1939): 118–126.
"The Sutton Hoo Ship Burial: The Silver." Antiquity 14 (1940): 40–63.
Early Medieval Art in the British Museum. London: British Museum, 1940; second edition 1955; Bloomington Indiana: Midland Books, Indiana University Press, 1964; third edition 1983; German edition: Kleine Geschichte der frühmiltelalterlichen Kunst, Cologne, 1987.
Portraits of Christ. Harmondsworth. The King Penguin Books, with Elizabeth Senior, 1940.
"The Horse and Lion Tapestry at Dumbarton Oaks: A Study in Coptic and Sassanian Textile Design." Dumbarton Oaks Papers 3 (1946): 1–72.
"A Survey of the Early Christian Town of Stobi," Dumbarton Oaks Papers 3 (1946): 81–161.
"The Mosaics of the Cappella Palatina in Palermo: An Essay on the Choice and Arrangement of Subjects." Art Bulletin 31 (1949): 269–292.
The Coffin of Saint Cuthbert. Oxford University Press, 1950.
"Mosaic Pavements in the Greek East and the Question of a 'Renaissance' under Justinian." Actes du VIe Congress International d'Études Byzantines, Paris, 27 juillet–2 août 1948, (Paris, 1951): 209–223.
"Studies on Late Antique and Early Byzantine Floor Mosaics: I. Mosaics at Nikopolis." Dumbarton Oaks Papers 6 (1951): 81–122.
"The Cult of Images in the Age before Iconoclasm." Dumbarton Oaks Papers 8 (1954): 83–150. Italian translation: Il culto delle immagini, Florence, 1992.
"On Some Icons of the Seventh Century." In Late Classical and Mediaeval Studies in Honor of Albert Mathias Friend, Jr., ed. K. Weitzmann et al., Princeton: Princeton University Press, 1955, 132–150.
"The Coffin-Reliquary." In The Relics of Saint Cuthbert, ed. C. F. Battiscombe, Oxford: Oxford University Press, 1956, 202–304.
"Byzantine Art in the Period between Justinian and Iconoclasm." Berichte zum XI Internationalen Byzantinisten-Kongress, München, 1958 (Munich, 1958), IV/1, 1–50; Japanese translation by S. Tsuji, Tokyo, 1971; Italian translation, Florence, 1992 (with Il culto delle immagini).
"A Marble Relief of the Theodosian Period." Dumbarton Oaks Papers 14 (1960): 17–42.
The Mosaics of Monreale. Palermo: S. F. Flaccovio Editore, 1960; also in Italian: I Mosaici di Monreale, tr. F. Bonajuto; republished, with a new preface, in 1991 (in Italian only).
"The Dumbarton Oaks Center for Byzantine Studies." Jahrbücher für Geschichte Osteuropas, N.F., 10, Heft 3 (1962): 485–491; reprinted with minor changes in Harvard Library Bulletin 19 (1971): 28–32.
"Some Reflections on Portraiture in Byzantine Art." Zbornik radova, 8/1 = Recueil des travaux de l'Institut d'Études byzantines, No. VIII = Mélanges G. Ostrogorsky, I (Belgrade, 1963): 185–193.
"The Hellenistic Heritage in Byzantine Art." Dumbarton Oaks Papers 17 (1963): 95–115. Reprinted in abridged form in Readings in Art History (H. Spencer, ed.), New York: Charles Scribner's Sons, 1969, I, 167–188.
Israeli Mosaics of the Byzantine Period. UNESCO. New York: The New American Library, Inc., 1965. Also published in Dutch, French, German, Italian, and Spanish.
"Stylistic Developments in Pavement Mosaics in the Greek East from the Age of Constantine to the Age of Justinian." La Mosaïque Greco-Romaine, Colloques Internationaux du Centre National de La Recherche Scientifique, Paris, 29 août–3 septembre, 1963. Paris, 1965, 341–352.
"Norman Sicily as a Source of Byzantine Influence on Western Art in the Twelfth Century." Byzantine Art—An European Art, lectures given on the occasion of the 9th Exhibition of the Council of Europe, Athens, 1966, 123–147.
"The Byzantine Contribution to Western Art of the Twelfth and Thirteenth Centuries," Dumbarton Oaks Papers 20 (1966): 25–47, 265–266.
"On the Interpretation of Stylistic Changes in Late Antique Art." Bucknell Review 15/3 (December 1967): 1–10.
"The Gregorian Reform and the Visual Arts: A Problem of Method." Transactions of the Royal Historical Society, 5th series, 22 (1972): 87–102.
"The First Mosaic Decoration of Salerno Cathedral." Jahrbuch der Ostereichischen Byzantinistik 21 (1972)=Festschrift für Otto Demus zum 70. Geburtstag, 149–162.
"World Map and Fortune's Wheel. A Medieval Mosaic Floor in Turin." Proceedings of the American Philosophical Society 117/5 (1973): 343–373.
"Observations on the Samson Floor at Mopsuestia." Dumbarton Oaks Papers 27 (1973). 133-144.
"A Pair of Silver Book Covers in the Sion Treasure." In Gatherings in Honor of Dorothy E. Minor, eds. U. McCracken, L. and R. Randall. Baltimore: Walters Art Gallery, 1974, 3–17.
"A Fourth Century Mosaic Floor in Pisidian Antioch." Mansel'e Armagan.' Mélanges Mansel [Arif Mufid Mansel], Türk Tarih Kurumu Yayinlari Dizi VII-Sa 60, Ankara, 1974, Vol. I, 385–395.
"Christus und die/wölf Apostel." Das Einhardkreuz, Vorträge und Studien der Münsteraner Diskussion zum arcus Einhardi, ed. Karl Hauck, Abhandlungen der Akademieder Wissenschaften in Göttingen, Philologische-Historische Klasse, 3, Folge, Nr. 87, Göttingen, 1974, 82–92.
"The Role of Miniature Painting in Mural Decoration." In The Place of Book Illumination in Byzantine Art, ed. K. Weitzmann. Princeton: Princeton University Art Museum, 1975, 99–142.
The Art of Byzantium and the Medieval West: Selected Studies, ed. W. E. Kleinbauer, Bloomington, Indiana: Indiana University Press, 1976.
Byzantine Art in the Making: Main Lines of Stylistic Development in Mediterranean Art—3rd–7th Century. London: Faber & Faber; Cambridge, Mass.: Harvard University Press, 1977; German edition: Byzantische Kunst im Werden, Cologne, 1984; Italian edition: L'arte bizantina, Milan, 1989.
"The Cleveland Marbles." Atti dell IX Congresso internazionale di archeologia cristiana; Roma 21–27 Settembre 1975. Rome, 1978, Vol. I, 653–675; reprinted in Studies in Early Christianity, 18 (P. C. Finney, ed.), New York and London 1993.
"A Virgin's Face: Antiquarianism in Twelfth-Century Art." Art Bulletin 62 (1980) 6–19.
"Christian Imagery: Growth and Impact." Age of Spirituality—A Symposium, ed. K. Weitzmann, The Metropolitan Museum of Art and Princeton University Press, 1980, 141–163.
"The Hellenistic Heritage in Byzantine Art Reconsidered." Jahrbuch der Oesterreichischen Byzantiniatik 31 (1981): 657–675.
"The Arts as Aspects of a Renaissance: Rome and Italy." In Renaissance and Renewal in the Twelfth Century, ed. R. L. Benson and G. Constable, Cambridge, Mass., 1982, 637–670.
"The Descent of the Dove: Observations on the Mosaic of the Annunciation in the Cappella Palatina in Palermo." Byzanz und der Westen, Vienna, 1984, 99–115.
"The Portraits of the Evangelists in the Cappella Palatina in Palermo," Studien zur mittelalterlichen Kunst 800–1250: Festschrift für Florentine Mütherich, Munich, 1985, 181–192.
"Enas naos tou l2ou aiona aphieromenos ste theotoko: He Panagia tou nauarchou sto Palermo," Deltion tes Christianikes Archaiologikes Hetaireias, ser. 4, 12, 1984 (published 1986), 167–194; republished in Italian in BCA Sicilia 6–8 (1985–1987): 11-31.
"Two Mosaic Ateliers in Palermo in the 1140s." Artistes, Artisans et Production Artistique au Moyen Age, ed. X Barral i Altet, I, Paris, 1986, 277–294.
"Reflections on the Feast Cycle in Byzantine Art." Cahiers Archéologiques 36 (1988): 51–73.
"Mosaic Decoration in Sicily under Roger I and the Classical Byzantine System of Church Decoration." In Italian Church Decoration of the Middle Ages and the Early Renaissance, ed. W. Tronzo, Bologna, 1989, 147–165.
"Closing Remarks," Artistes, Artisans et Production Artistique au Moyen Age, ed. X Barral i Altet, I, Paris, 1990, 647–650.
The Mosaics of St. Mary's of the Admiral in Palermo, (Dumbarton Oaks Studies 27), Washington D.C., 1990; I mosaici di Santa Maria dell Ammiraglio a Palermo (Instituto Siciliano di Studi Bizantini e Neoellenici, Monumenti 3). Palermo 1990.
"Artistic Patronage in Early Byzantium." Settimane di studio del Centro italiano di studi sull'alto medioevo 39 (1992): 33–55.
I mosaici del periodo normanno in Sicilia, Fasc. I: La Cappella Palatina di Palermo: I mosaici del presbiterio. Palermo 1992.
"Bizantina Arte." Enciclopedia dell'arte medievale, III, Rome 1992, 517–534.
"Interlace and Icons: Form and Function in Early Insular Art," The Age of Migrating Ideas—Proceedings of the Second International Conference on Insular Art, ed. R. Michael Spearman and John Higgitt, Edinburgh 1993, 3–15.
I mosaici del periodo normanno in Sicilia, Fasc. II: La Cappella Palatina di Palermo: I mosaici delle navate. Palermo 1993.
I mosaici del periodo normanno in Sicilia, Fasc. III: Il Duomo di Monreale: I mosaici dell'abside, della solea e delle cappelle laterali. Palermo 1994.
"Kurt Weitzmann (7 March 1904–7 June 1993)", Proceedings of the American Philosophical Society vol. 139, no. 2, June 1995, pp. 203–209.
I mosaici del periodo normanno in Sicilia, Fasc. IV: Il Duomo di Monreale: I mosaici del transetto, Palermo 1995.
"The Mandylion at Monreale." Milion 3 (1995): 575–602.
Studies in Late Antique, Byzantine and Medieval Western Art. 2 Vols. Vol 1: Studies in Late Antique & Byzantine Art; Vol II: Studies in Medieval Western Art and the Art of Norman Sicily. London: Pindar Press (2002 and 2004).

== Bibliography ==
- Maguire, Henry (2003). "Ernst Kitzinger: 1912–2003". Dumbarton Oaks Papers. 5: ix–xiv. ISSN 0070-7546. (Available online.)

(Other obituaries, besides the one cited above, include: The Guardian, January 29, 2003; The Times, February 7, 2003; The Independent, February 8, 2003 (all London); The New York Times, February 9, 2003; Art in America, April 2003; Speculum, July 2004; American Philosophical Society Proceedings, September 2007.)
