= Kenneth Setton =

American historian (1914–1995)

Kenneth Meyer Setton
- Born: June 17, 1914; New Bedford, Massachusetts, United States
- Died: February 18, 1995 (aged 80); Princeton, New Jersey, United States
- Education: Boston University (BA 1936); Columbia University (MA 1938, PhD 1941)
- Occupation: Historian

Kenneth Meyer Setton (June 17, 1914 – February 18, 1995) was an American historian and an expert on the history of medieval Europe, particularly the Crusades.

== Early life, education and awards ==
Setton's childhood and adolescence were not easy. He supported himself from the age of 13. Setton received his bachelor's degree in 1936 as a Phi Beta Kappa graduate of Boston University. He received his master's degree in 1938 and PhD in 1941 at Columbia University. His dissertation Christian Attitude Toward the Emperor in the Fourth Century was written under the direction of Lynn Thorndike. He also received honorary degrees from Boston University and the University of Kiel. He claimed that knowledge of languages is the basis of knowledge of historical science, and he spoke Italian, French, German and Catalan, besides his favorites, Latin and classical Greek.

Setton spent nearly two decades finishing his classic work, the four-volume The Papacy and the Levant, 1204-1571. For the first two published volumes he received the Haskins Medal of the Medieval Academy of America in 1980. He served as the editor-in-chief of the Wisconsin Collaborative History of the Crusades, published in six volumes from 1969 to 1989.

Setton was elected to the American Philosophical Society in 1952. He received the John Frederick Lewis Award of the Society three times: first in 1957 for his work The Byzantine Background to the Italian Renaissance, then in 1984 for his work The Papacy and the Levant, volume 3 and 4 and in 1990 for his work Venice, Austria and the Turks in the 17th Century.

Setton was elected to the American Academy of Arts and Sciences in 1960.

== Career ==
Setton began his teaching career at Boston University and the University of Manitoba. Next he taught at the University of Pennsylvania between 1950 and 1965, succeeding another medievalist, John L. La Monte. In the period between 1965 and 1968 he taught at the University of Wisconsin, where he was appointed director of the Institute for Research in the Humanities. After 1968 he worked at the Institute for Advanced Study in Princeton, New Jersey.

He had many concurrent appointments, such as director of the library at the University of Pennsylvania, acting director of the Gennadius Library in Greece, and Guggenheim Fellow.

== Selected works ==
- Christian Attitude Towards the Emperor in the Fourth Century, Columbia University Press, 1941
- The Bulgars in the Balkans and the occupation of Corinth in the seventh century, Mediaeval Academy of America, 1950
- The Papacy and the Levant, 1204-1571. Philadelphia: American Philosophical Society. 1976–1984. ISBN 0-87169-114-0. OCLC 2698253.
- A History of the Crusades (1969–1989). Six volumes. University of Wisconsin Press, 1955–1989, as editor in chief with Harry W. Hazard, Robert Lee Wolff, Marshall W. Baldwin and Norman P. Zacour as co-editors. This series is known as the Wisconsin Collaborative History of the Crusades.
- Venice, Austria and the Turks in the 17th Century, American Philosophical Society, 1991, ISBN 978-0-87169-192-7
- Western Hostility to Islam, American Philosophical Society, 1992, ISBN 978-0-87169-201-6
- Catalan domination of Athens, 1311-1388. London: Variorum. 1975. ISBN 0-902089-77-3. OCLC 73998789. A history of the founding of the Catalan Company and their subsequent control of the Duchy of Athens and Thebes.
- The Catalans in Greece (1975).
- The Age of Chivalry (1969).
- Europe and the Levant in the Middle Ages and the Renaissance. London: Variorum Reprints. 1974. ISBN 0-902089-64-1. OCLC 1128239.
- Setton, Kenneth Meyer (1975). Athens in the Middle Ages. London: Variorum Reprints. ISBN 0-902089-84-6. OCLC 73998786.
