= Robert Brentano =

American historian

Robert James Brentano (19 May 1926 – 21 November 2002) was a prize-winning author and historian of medieval England and Italy. One of his books, Two churches: England and Italy in the thirteenth century, won the 1968 John Gilmary Shea Prize and the Haskins Medal. Brentano was elected to the American Academy of Arts and Sciences in 1978 and the American Philosophical Society in 1996.

== Works ==
- York metropolitan jurisdiction and papal judges delegate (1279–1296). Berkeley: University of California Press. 1959.
- Early Middle Ages, 500–1000. NY: Free Press of Glencoe. 1964.
- An outline of the age of the Renaissance. Toronto: Forum House. 1970.
- Two churches: England and Italy in the thirteenth century. Princeton University Press. 1968.2nd edn. with an additional essay by the author. Berkeley: University of California Press. 1988.
- Rome before Avignon: a social history of thirteenth-century Rome. NY: Basic Books. 1974.
- A new world in a small place: church and religion in the Diocese of Rieti, 1188–1378; with an appendix by John Gardner on the frescoes in the choir of San Franceso. Berkeley: University of California Press. 1994.
- Bishops, saints, and historians: studies in the ecclesiastical history of medieval Britain and Italy; essays by Robert Brentano; edited and selected by William Linden North, professor of history at Carleton College. Aldershot, England/Burlington Vermont: Ashgate/Variorum. 2008.
