= Josef Dillersberger =

Austrian Roman Catholic priest and Bible scholar

Josef Dillersberger (March 30, 1897 – July 5, 1972) was an Austrian Roman Catholic priest and Bible scholar.

== Background and education ==
He was born in Kufstein, attended school in Bozen and graduated from high school in 1915. After studying theology in Salzburg for four years, he was ordained a priest on August 1, 1919. He combined his graduate studies with work in parishes until 1927. He received the Doctorate in Salzburg in 1924, and the Habilitation from the same university in 1927. The following year was devoted to studies at the Pontifical Biblical Institute in Rome.

== Academic career ==
In 1931, complaints were filed against Dillersberger in the Vatican, although no disciplinary measures were taken. He was appointed Professor of New Testament at Salzburg University in 1933, but forced into retirement from 1941 to 1945 due to National Socialist measures against Catholic theologians. He resumed teaching after the Second World War and continued to do so until retiring in 1966; afterwards, he continued to lecture, drawing large audiences. He served as the dean of the theological faculty for a total of four periods. He was widely published in scholarly and popular journals.

As the Innsbruck Bible scholar Paul Gächter remarked in an early review, "Dillersberger has understood very well that only exegesis together with dogmatics can provide the full harmony of an exhaustive explanation."

== Pastoral and clerical work ==
Dillersberger was highly committed to pastoral work, which he saw as a necessary extension of his work as a Bible scholar. He was a member of the Neuland movement; he served as the spiritual director in the Salzburg Seminary from 1928 to 1933. He was made a member of the cathedral chapter in 1944, and made monsignor in 1964. Colleagues attested his generous and humble manner, noting his commitment to kindling enthusiasm for the New Testament among Catholics and his pronounced fidelity to the Holy See.

His widely distributed translations of the Bible, breviaries, Marian devotions, and spiritual handbooks made Dillersberger known to Catholics in all of German-speaking Europe. Many were published in several editions, like his lay breviary which saw its fifth edition in 1957. Several publications were translated into French.

== Antisemitism ==
In the years before Austria became a part of the Third Reich, he published some antisemitic articles. John Connelly noted that "Josef Dillersberger (1897–1972), Doktorvater to bishops and archbishops, wrote in July 1936 that the persecution of Jews in Germany expressed the will of God. He concluded, “Who can argue with God? [Wer darf rechten mit Gott?]."

Having known about anti-Jewish discrimination in the Reich for several years, and even after the enactment of the Nuremberg Laws, Dillersberger wrote an article for his diocesan newspaper in Salzburg in 1936 titled "The Sunday of Anti-Semitism". It was a historical account of antisemitism in which the Salzburg professor claimed that Christians need not help Jews, since their suffering was a continuation of divine judgment against them.

== New Testament Translations ==
In his translations of the Synoptic Gospels, Dillersberger remains very close to the source text and is thus a precursor of the translator Fridolin Stier (1902–1981), a respected Tübingen professor for Old Testament. Dillersberger published translations and commentaries on the Gospels of Matthew, Mark and Luke, but not on the Gospel of John. Only fragments of John are available, namely in Dillersberger's books of hours. The synoptic gospels were issued by Otto Müller, a Salzburg publisher, in handy, portable books that were thin and usually spanned five or six volumes. They were meant to meet scholarly standards while inviting readers to meditate the gospels.

== Select publications ==
- Der neue Gott, ein biblisch-theologischer Versuch über den Epheserbrief (Salzburg-Leipzig: Anton Pustet 1935).
- Das Wort vom Logos. Vorlesung über das Johannes-Prolog (Salzburg, Leipzig: Anton Pustet 1935).
- Markus: Das Evangelium des heiligen Markus, in theologisch und heilsgeschichtlich vertiefter Schau (Salzburg: Otto Müller, several volumes).
- Matthäus: Das Evangelium des heiligen Matthäus in theologischer und heilsgeschichtlicher Schau (Salzburg: Otto Müller, several volumes).
- Lukas: Das Evangelium des heiligen Lukas in theologischer und heilsgeschichtlicher Schau (Salzburg: Otto Müller, several volumes).
- Wer es fassen kann...: Gedanken über Jungfräulichkeit und Zölibat aus Schrift und Liturgie (Salzburg: Anton Pustet 1939).
- Die Stimme deines Grusses: Gedanken und Betrachtungen über das "Salve Regina" (Graz: Anton Pustet 1947).
- Der neue Mensch: Seligpreisungen und Tugendleben (Einsiedeln: Benziger 1949).
- Das ist der Tag des Herrn Besinnungen (Salzburg: Otto Müller 1956).
