= Francis Christopher Oakley =

British medievalist

- Born: 1931 (age 94–95); England
- Education: Oxford University; Yale University
- Organization(s): Sterling and Francine Clark Art Institute, Williams College
- Notable work: Omnipotence, Covenant and Order: An Excursion in the History of Ideas from Abelard to Leibniz (1984); Community of Learning: The American College and the Liberal Arts Tradition (1992); The Conciliarist Tradition: Constitutionalism in the Catholic Church, 1300-1870 (2003)

Francis Christopher Oakley (born 1931) is the former Edward Dorr Griffin Professor of the History of Ideas at Williams College, president emeritus of Williams College and president emeritus of the American Council of Learned Societies, New York. He also served as interim director of the Sterling and Francine Clark Art Institute.

== Biography ==
Born in England in 1931 to Irish immigrant parents and raised in Liverpool. He was educated at Oxford University and graduated in 1953 with First Class Honours in the Honours School of Modern History. Awarded a Goldsmiths' Company's Commonwealth Traveling Research Scholarship, he spent the next two years studying Latin Palaeography and the history of Medieval Philosophy at the Pontifical Institute of Mediaeval Studies in Toronto.

Oakley's graduate studies were interrupted by the need to return to England to serve for two years (followed by reserve duty) in the British Army, where he rose to the rank of lieutenant in the Royal Corps of Signals and was attached to the Commonwealth Communications Army Network (COMCAN). Having decided to return to North America, he completed his Ph.D in History at Yale University in 1959. He spent the next two years teaching in the Yale History Department before taking a position in the history department of Williams College. There, for forty years, he taught medieval and early-modern history, as well as courses in the Interdepartmental History of Ideas major (of which he was co-founder) and in the Environmental Studies Program until his retirement in 2002.

Oakley spent seventeen years of senior administrative service at Williams (1977–94), first as dean of the faculty, then as president of the college, and later, 2002–03, as president of the American Council of Learned Societies in New York City—an interim appointment.

Oakley has held visiting research appointments at the Institute for Advanced Study in Princeton, New Jersey, the National Humanities Center in North Carolina, and the Woodrow Wilson International Center for Scholars in Washington, D.C. During the academic year 1999-2000, he held the Sir Isaiah Berlin Visiting Professorship in the History of Ideas at Oxford University.

Oakley has written extensively on topics about medieval and early modern intellectual and religious history and American higher education, and is the co-editor of three volumes and the author of fifteen books. Prominent among the latter are his Omnipotence, Covenant and Order: An Excursion in the History of Ideas from Abelard to Leibniz, (1984), Community of Learning: The American College and the Liberal Arts Tradition (1992), and The Conciliarist Tradition: Constitutionalism in the Catholic Church 1300-1870 (2003), which was awarded the Roland H. Bainton Book Prize in 2004. For ten years, Oakley worked on a trilogy with the overall title of The Emergence of Western Political Thought in the Latin Middle Ages, published by Yale University Press between 2010 and 2015, and for which he received the 2016 Haskins Medal from the Medieval Academy of America. An honorary Fellow of Corpus Christi College, Oxford, he is also Fellow of the Medieval Academy of America (President of the Fellows, 1999-2002) and the American Academy of Arts and Sciences. He holds honorary degrees, LL.D., L.H.D. and Litt.D., from Notre Dame, Northwestern University, Wesleyan University, Massachusetts College of Liberal Arts, Sacred Heart University, Amherst College, Bowdoin College, Southern Methodist University, and Williams College.

The historian has served for many years on the boards of various non-profit organizations in the arts and higher education, among them the Williamstown Theatre Festival, the Massachusetts Museum of Contemporary Art (MASS MoCA), the American Council of Learned Societies (board chair 1994-97), the Sterling and Francine Clark Art Institute (board president 1998-2005), and the National Humanities Center (board chair 2004-7). Oakley currently serves as the interim director of the Sterling and Francine Clark Art Institute.

He is married to the former Claire-Ann Lamenzo of Manchester, CT, a fiber artist and horsewoman. They have four children—Deirdre, Christopher, Timothy, and Brian—and seven grandchildren: William, Charlotte, Ryann, Erin, Kevin and Joslyn Oakley.
