= Louis John Paetow =

American historian

- Born: 1879 or 1880; Milwaukee, Wisconsin, US
- Died: 22 Dec 1928; Berkeley, California, US
- Occupation: Historian

Louis John Paetow (1879/1880 – 22 December 1928) was an American historian and university professor. He specialized in medieval European history.

== Career ==
In 1919, he became a Professor of medieval history at the University of California, Berkeley.

== Awards and honours ==
He received the Edward K. Rand prize for medieval studies.

He was a fellow and counselor of the Medieval Academy of America.

== Bibliography ==
He is the author of a number of notable books:

- A guide to the study of medieval history for students, teachers, and libraries -
- The arts course at medieval universities -
- Crusades and Other Historical Essays
- The Battle of the seven Arts
