= Diogenes or On Tyranny =

Diogenes or On Tyranny (Ancient Greek: Διογένης ἢ περὶ τυραννίδος, romanized: Diogenēs e peri turannidos, Oration 6 in modern corpora) is a speech delivered by Dio Chrysostom between AD 82 and 96, arguing for the superiority of the cynic lifestyle, through a contrast between the life of Diogenes and that of the Persian king, the prototypical tyrant. In contrasting "the 'free' wandering of Diogenes with the anxious, unsettled flitting of the Persian kin, [the speech] impliciting assimilat[es] Dio to Diogenes and Domitian to the king"

== Background ==
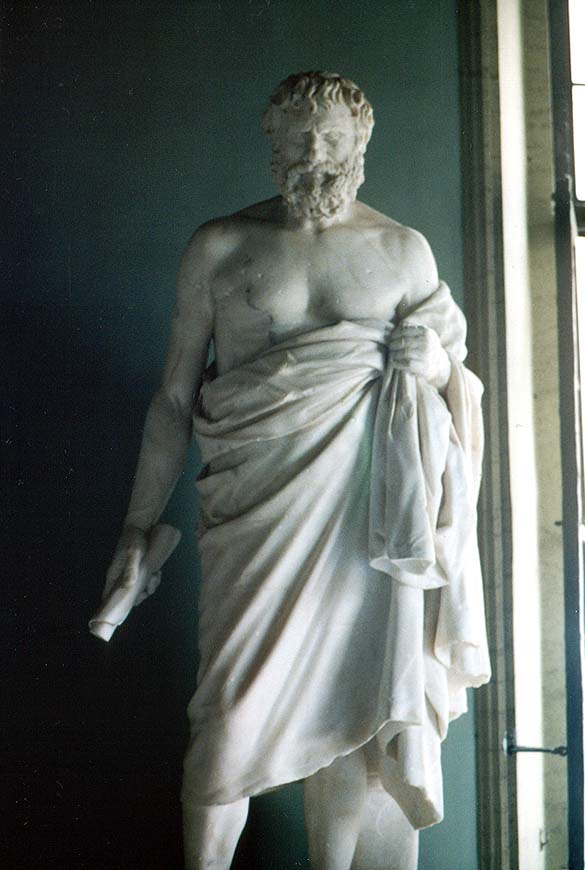
Statue of an unknown Cynic philosopher from the Capitoline Museums in Rome.

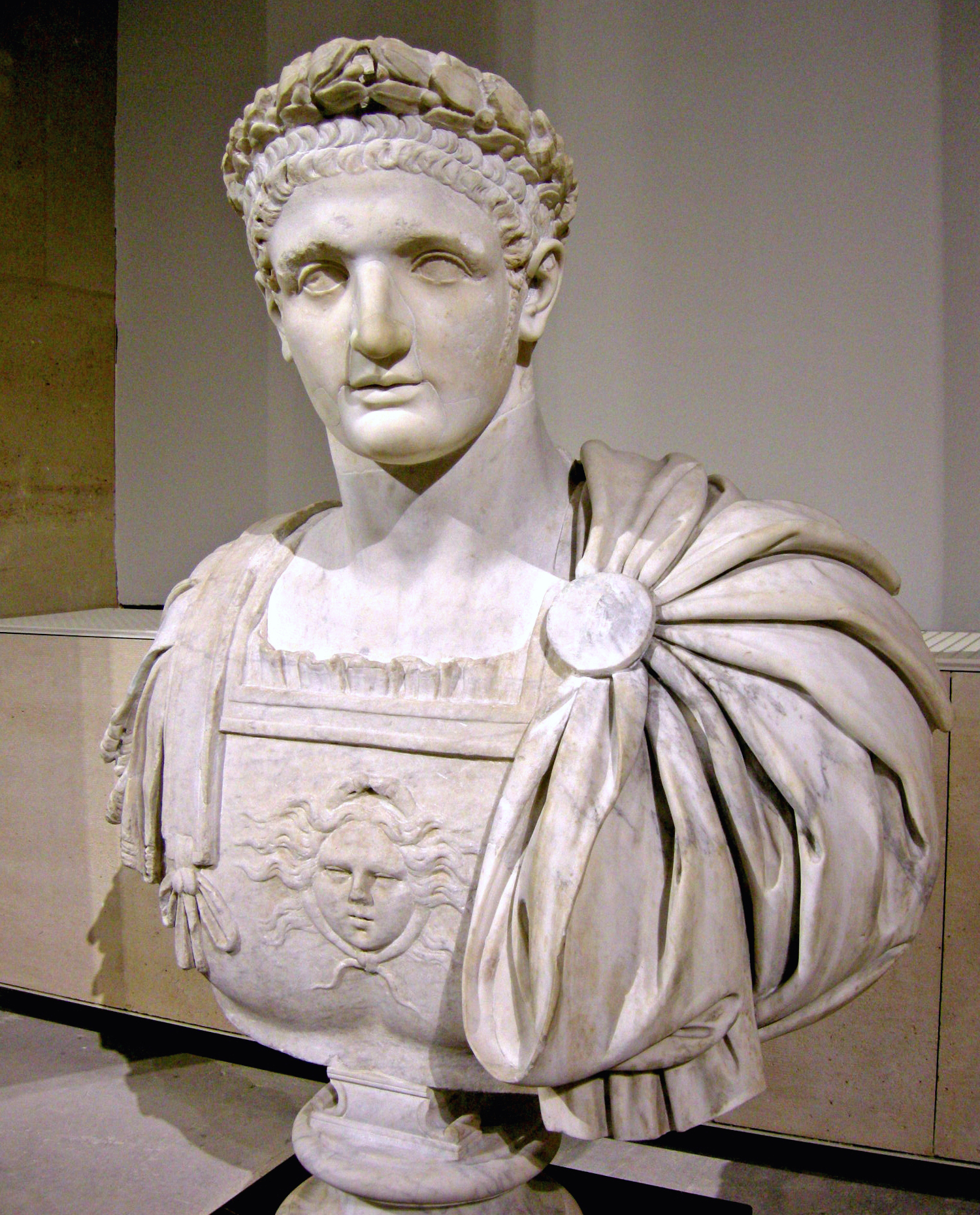
Bust of the Emperor Domitian, who lies behind Dio's characterisation of the Persian king.

The fourth-century BC philosopher Diogenes founded the Cynic school of philosophy after being exiled from his hometown of Sinope. He was famous for his very ascetic lifestyle, living outdoors and going without shoes or clothes. Dio Chrysostom was exiled by the Emperor Domitian in AD 82 and, according to his 13th oration, On his Banishment, he then adopted the guise of a Cynic philosopher and travelled Greece and the Black Sea, delivering orations like this one.

== Summary ==
The speech opens with the announcement that Diogenes used to compare himself to the Persian king, since he was accustomed to travel from Athens to Corinth depending on the season, just as the Persian king travelled from Babylon to his summer palace in Ecbatana (sections 1–3).

=== Diogenes ===
This leads into the first half of the speech, in which Dio explains how Diogenes' ascetic lifestyle was more healthy and pleasant than a comfortable lifestyle (4-33). He lives in tune with the natural order and because he only eats or drinks when he is hungry, he enjoys the experience more than someone who gorges themselves (8-13). He is control of his desires and desires the right things: water rather than fancy wines, the temple and gymnasium rather than a palatial home (14). His capacity to fulfil his own desires without expenditure is illustrated by a discussion of masturbation, compared favourably to the use of prostitutes.

Diogenes' lifestyle is like that of an animal and this leads to an excursus on how animals are better than people (21-29), since they are healthy up to the moment of death, while people are always sick. People are not naturally incapable of living like animals, because of a lack of hair and claws, but become so as a result of their lifestyle. For example, the rich live like infants in swaddling clothes (15). These people use the special human characteristic of wisdom (sophia) to achieve pleasure (hedone), instead of manly bravery (andreia) and justice (dikaiosyne) (29).

Diogenes' lifestyle is summarised (30-33), as the avoidance of expense (polydapane) and business (pragmateia) and the use of things that strengthen his body and meet the demands of his appetite. In so acting, he "imitated the life of the gods."

=== Persian king ===
In the second half of the speech, Dio turns to the lifestyle of the Persian king, explaining that whereas Diogenes was "the only free man in the world" the king was "the most wretched man in the world" (34-59).

The king is wretched primarily because his constant fear of losing his pleasurable lifestyle means that he cannot enjoy it. The anticipation of suffering is worse than the actual experience of suffering, and the king is constantly anticipating the worst forms of death (42-45). The king's lifestyle is characterised by the greatest absurdity (atopotaton): he is most wretched because he is considered the most blessed; the constant stream of pleasurable things in his life leaves him dulled to pleasure, but the constant stream of worries only wears him out (45-48). All states are undesirable to him - war or peace, prosperity or hard times - since they all could lead to threats to his regime and life (50-53). Dio elaborates on the image of Damocles' sword - the king is like a man locked in a box, with a sword dangling over his head and countless swords poking at him from all sides (54-55). While the tyrant of a single town could flee this state, a king who rules the whole world has no prospect of escape (56-57). To the king, all feedback from others is hateful or suspicious or insulting: praise or blame, frankness or flattery (57-59).

=== Conclusion ===
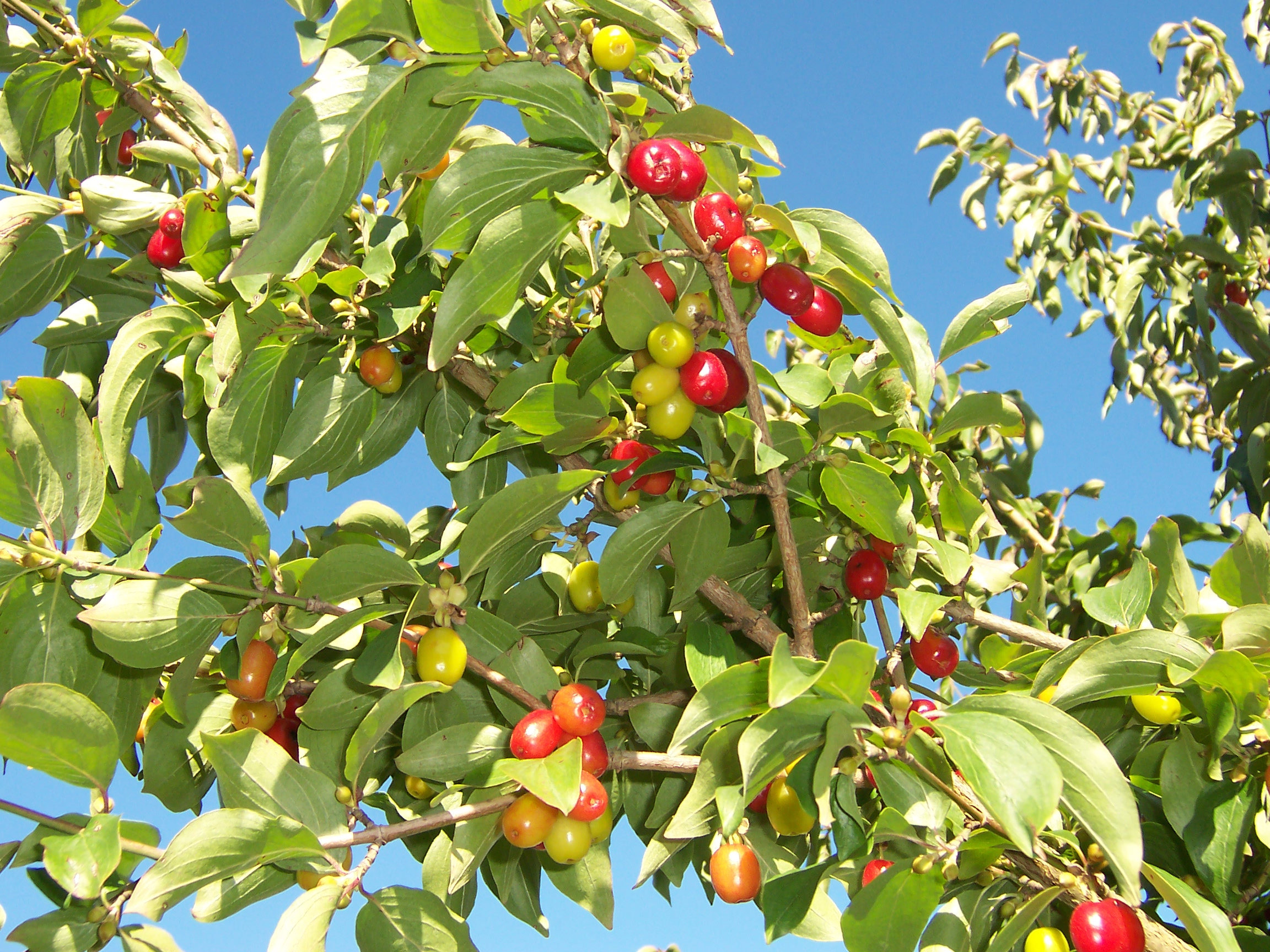
Cornel berries.

A brief conclusion, delivered in the voice of Diogenes, returns to the excellence of his lifestyle (60-62). Because he is beneath notice, he is free to go wherever he likes, without fear of armies or bandits. If disaster should befall the world, he will be able to live comfortably in the wilderness:

For all the food I need will be provided by apples, millet, barley, vetch, the cheapest lentils, acorns in the ashes, and the cornel berries, with which Homer says Circe feasted Odysseus' companions, which is enough to feed even the largest animals.

== Analysis ==
The opposition of the Cynic philosopher with the monarch was probably already a topos of earlier Cynic literature. Seneca draws a similar contrast in De Clementia 1.8. Dio gives the theme a contemporary dimension by assimilating the figures of Diogenes and the Persian king to himself and Domitian.

== Editions ==
- Hans von Arnim, Dionis Prusaensis quem uocant Chrysostomum quae exstant omnia (Berlin, 1893–1896).
- Trans. J. W. Cohoon, Dio Chrysostom, I, Discourses 1–11, 1932. Harvard University Press, Loeb Classical Library:

== Bibliography ==
- Brancacci, Aldo (2002). "Dio, Socrates, and Cynicism". In Swain, Simon (ed.). Dio Chrysostom: Politics, Letters, and Philosophy. Oxford University Press. pp. 240–260. ISBN 978-0-19-925521-4.
- Brenk, Frederick E. (2002). "Dio on the Simple and Self-Sufficient Life". In Swain, Simon (ed.). Dio Chrysostom: Politics, Letters, and Philosophy. Oxford University Press. pp. 261–278. ISBN 978-0-19-925521-4.
- Degli'Innocenti Pierini (2014). "Freedom in Seneca: Some Reflections on the Relationship between Philosophy and Politics, Public and Private Life". In Wildberger, Jula; Colish, Marcia L. (eds.). Seneca Philosophus. Berlin. pp. 167–188. ISBN 9783110349863.
- Suvák, Vladislav (2022). "Ideál kynika v Diónových Rečiach". Pro-Fil – an Internet Journal of Philosophy. 23 (1): 16–27. doi:10.5817/pf22-1-20926.
- Trapp, Michael (2017). Philosophy in the Roman Empire: Ethics, Politics and Society. Routledge. ISBN 978-1-351-91141-2.
- Whitmarsh, Tim (2001). "'Greece is the World': Exile and Identity in the Second Sophistic". Being Greek under Rome : cultural identity, the second sophistic and the development of empire. Cambridge, UK: Cambridge University Press. pp. 269–305. ISBN 9780521663175.
