= Dyan Elliott =

- Born: 1954 (age 71–72)
- Occupation: Historian

Academic background
- Education: University of Toronto (PhD)

Academic work
- Discipline: Medieval studies
- Sub-discipline: Women in the medieval church
- Institutions: Northwestern University

Dyan Elliott (born 1954) is a Canadian medievalist specialising in gender and sexuality studies. She is the Peter B. Ritzma Professor of History at Northwestern University, where she teaches the medieval period.

== Life ==
Elliott was born in 1954 and was raised Anglican. Although she is no longer religious, she credited her religious upbringing for beginning her interest in church history.

She received her Ph.D. from the University of Toronto in 1989.

Dyan Elliott’s research about "gender, sexuality, spirituality" adds levels of evaluation and understanding regarding church history, and those who were affected negatively and positively by its hierarchy and authority figures. Her work has won her several prestigious awards and fellowships in her field.

Elliott's 2020 book, The Corrupter of Boys: Sodomy, Scandal, and the Medieval Clergy, explores sexual abuse in the medieval church. In 2024, Elliott spoke on "sexual abuse by clergy in the Middle Ages" at the Pontifical Gregorian University's conference "The Memory of Power and Abuse of Power".

In addition to several academic books, Elliott has also written a historical novel, A Hole in the Heavens (2017).

== Awards ==
- National Endowment for the Humanities (NEH) Research Fellowship, 2021
- John Simon Guggenheim Memorial Foundation Fellow, 2020
- ACLS Fellowship, September 2016- September 2017
- National Humanities Center Fellowship, 1997-1998; 2012-2013
- Elected fellow of the Medieval Academy of America, March 2010

== Publications ==
=== Books ===
- Spiritual Marriage: Sexual Abstinence in Medieval Wedlock (Princeton, New Jersey: Princeton University Press, 1992)
- Fallen Bodies: Pollution, Sexuality, and Demonology in the Middle Ages (Philadelphia: University of Pennsylvania Press, 1999)
- Proving Woman: Female Mysticism and Inquisitional Practice in Late Medieval Europe (Princeton, New Jersey: Princeton University Press, 2004)
  - Winner of the 2006 Otto Gründler Award for outstanding contribution to medieval studies, Western Michigan University
- The Bride of Christ Goes to Hell: Metaphor and Embodiment in the Lives of Pious Women, 200-1500 (Philadelphia: University of Pennsylvania Press, 2012)
- The Corrupter of Boys: Sodomy, Scandal, and the Medieval Clergy (Philadelphia: University of Pennsylvania Press, 2020)
  - Winner of the 2022 Otto Gründler Book Prize, Western Michigan University

=== Articles and chapters ===
- Elliott, Dyan (January 1991). "Dress as Mediator between Inner and Outer Self: The Pious Matron of the High and Later Middle Ages". Mediaeval Studies. 53: 279–308. doi:10.1484/J.MS.2.306389. ISSN 0076-5872.
- Elliott, Dyan (2002). "Seeing Double: John Gerson, the Discernment of Spirits, and Joan of Arc". The American Historical Review. 107 (1): 26–54. doi:10.1086/532095. ISSN 0002-8762. JSTOR 10.1086/532095.
- Elliott, Dyan (2003). "Marriage". In Dinshaw, C; Wallace, D (eds.). The Cambridge Companion to Medieval Women's Writing. Cambridge Companions to Literature. Cambridge University Press. pp. 40–57.
- Elliott, Dyan (2008). "The Three Ages of Joan Scott". The American Historical Review. 113 (5): 1390–1403. doi:10.1086/ahr.113.5.1390. ISSN 0002-8762. JSTOR 30223448.
- Elliott, Dyan (2010). "Historical Faith/Historian's Faith". Religion & Literature. 42 (1/2): 247–252. JSTOR 23049479.
- Elliott, Dyan (2013). "Gender and The Christian Traditions". In Bennett, Judith; Karras, Ruth (eds.). The Oxford Handbook of Women and Gender in Medieval Europe. Oxford Handbooks. Oxford University Press. doi:10.1093/oxfordhb/9780199582174.013.011. ISBN 978-0-19-958217-4.
- Elliott, Dyan (2017). "Violence against the Dead: The Negative Translation and damnatio memoriae in the Middle Ages". Speculum. 92 (4): 1020–1055. doi:10.1086/693377. ISSN 0038-7134. JSTOR 26583618.
