= Marcia Colish =

American historian (1937–2024)

- Born: July 27, 1937; Brooklyn, New York
- Died: April 9, 2024 (aged 86); New Haven, Connecticut
- Occupation: Historian
- Awards: Guggenheim Fellowship (1989–1990); Haskins Medal (1998)

Academic background
- Education: Smith College (BA 1958); Yale University (MA 1959, PhD 1965)
- Academic advisors: Roland Bainton and Jaroslav Pelikan

Academic work
- Discipline: Historian
- Sub-discipline: Medieval history; Intellectual history
- Institutions: Oberlin College (1963–2001)

Marcia L. Colish (July 27, 1937 – April 9, 2024) was an American historian who specialized in medieval intellectual history. From 1963 to 2001 she taught at Oberlin College, where she became the Frederick B. Artz Professor of History and retired emeritus. From 2001 onwards she pursued historical research at Yale University. She won a Guggenheim Fellowship (1989–1990) and the Haskins Medal (1998) for her book on Peter Lombard. She was a Fellow (from 1988) and President (1991–1992) of the Medieval Academy of America.

== Early life and education ==
Marcia Colish was born on July 27, 1937 in Brooklyn, New York, the daughter of Dr. Samuel and Daisy K. Colish. She gained her BA from Smith College in 1958. She continued to Yale University for her MA (1959) and PhD (1965), studying there with historians of Christianity Roland Bainton and Jaroslav Pelikan.

== Career ==
After a short period teaching at Skidmore College, Colish joined Oberlin College in 1963. She specialized in medieval intellectual history. She was a member of the School of Historical Studies of the Institute for Advanced Study at Princeton 1986–1987. She was made a Fellow of the Medieval Academy of America in 1988, and she served as President of the Academy 1991–1992. She used a Guggenheim Fellowship in 1989–1990 to work on her book on Peter Lombard, for which she won the Haskins Medal in 1998. Yale Graduate School awarded her its Wilbur Cross Medal in 1993. She was a fellow at the Woodrow Wilson Center 1994–1995. In the 1960s she led the campaign to abolish a nepotism rule at Oberlin that prevented both members of a couple from serving on the faculty. In the early 1990s she helped lead the campaign to reform Oberlin's sexual harassment policy.

On retirement from Oberlin, Colish moved to Guilford to be nearer to Long Island Sound and Yale University. She continued to pursue research as a fellow at Yale. A 2002 symposium on her work, held at the Claremont Graduate School, resulted in a festschrift published in 2010.

She died on April 9, 2024, in New Haven, Connecticut, leaving her body to the Yale University Medical School.

== Works ==
- The Mirror of Language: A Study in the Medieval Theory of Knowledge Yale UP, 1968; 2nd rev. ed., University of Nebraska Press, 1983.
- The Stoic Tradition from Antiquity to the Early Middle Ages, 2 vols. Leiden: Brill, 1985; rev. paperback ed., 1990.
- Peter Lombard, 2 vols. Leiden: Brill, 1994.
- Medieval Foundations of the Western Intellectual Tradition, 400-1400. Yale UP, 1997; paperback ed., 1999; new printing, 2003. Italian trans., 2001; Chinese trans., 2009.
- Remapping Scholasticism. Toronto: Pontifical Institute of Mediaeval Studies, 2000.
- Ambrose’s Patriarchs: Ethics for the Common Man. University of Notre Dame Press, 2005; paperback ed., 2005.
- Studies in Scholasticism. Aldershot: Ashgate, 2006.
- The Fathers and Beyond: Church Fathers between Ancient and Medieval Thought. Aldershot: Ashgate, 2008.
- Faith, Fiction and Force in Medieval Baptismal Debates. 2014.
