= Madeline H. Caviness =

Scholar of European medieval art

Professor Emeritus Madeline Harrison Caviness
- Born: 1938 (age 87–88)
- Awards: FMAoA, FRS

Academic background
- Education: University of Cambridge and Harvard University

Academic work
- Discipline: Art history
- Sub-discipline: Medieval period; stained glass
- Institutions: Tufts University

Madeline Harrison Caviness, FMAoA, FSA (born 1938) is a British-American scholar of European medieval art, and an expert on glass painting and medieval women as viewers of art. She is a professor emeritus at Tufts University in Medford, Massachusetts.

== Education ==
Caviness attended Cambridge University, earning a bachelor's degree in 1959 and a master's degree in 1963. She earned her Ph.D. in fine arts from Harvard University in 1970.

== Career ==
Caviness is a professor emeritus at Tufts University. She is considered an expert on European medieval stained glass. She has participated in efforts to find and catalog stained glass works that were collected by Americans. Some of the earliest pieces she has discovered in the United States date back to the 12th century.

Caviness was president of Corpus Vitrearum, an international scholarly organization dedicated to the study of medieval stained glass, from 1987 to 1995. She served as president of the Medieval Academy of America from 1993 to 1994.

Caviness's contributions to the study of medieval art were celebrated in the collection The Four Modes of Seeing: Approaches to Medieval Imagery in Honor of Madeline Harrison Caviness, edited by Evelyn Staudinger Lane, Elizabeth Carson Pastan, and Ellen Shortell, and published by Ashgate in 2009.

Caviness's 1980s academic inference that 4 stained glass panels in Canterbury Cathedral predated others and a destructive fire was confirmed by technology in 2021.

== Selected works ==
=== Books ===
- The Early Stained Glass of Canterbury Cathedral, ca. 1175-1220 (1997), Princeton University Press. (Brown Prize)
- The Windows of Christ Church Cathedral, Canterbury (Corpus Vitrearum Medii Aevii, Great Britain II) (1981), Oxford University Press.
- Sumptuous Arts at the Royal Abbeys in Reims and Braine, Ornatus elegantiae, varietate stupendes (1990), Princeton University Press.
- Visualizing Women in the Middle Ages: Sight, Spectacle, and the Scopic Economy (2001), University of Pennsylvania Press.

=== Articles ===
- (As Madeleine Harrison) "A Life of St. Edward the Confessor in early fourteenth-century stained glass at Fécamp in Normandy," Journal of the Warburg and Courtauld Institutes, XXVI (1963) 22–37
- "A Lost Cycle of Canterbury Paintings of 1220," The Antiquaries Journal, LIV (1974). 60–74.
- "Gender Symbolism and Text Image Relationships: Hildegard of Bingen's Scivias" in Jeanette Beer, ed., Translation Theory and Practice in the Middle Ages, Kalamazoo: Medieval Institute Publications, 1997, pp. 71–111.

=== Photography and Digital scholarship ===
Caviness has contributed over 1400 images of stained glass to the Artstor Digital Library.

Caviness has contributed photographs to the Conway Library at the Courtauld Institute of Art.

== Awards and honors ==
Caviness was appointed Fellow of the American Academy of Arts and Sciences. She is an elected member of the Society of Antiquaries in London (1980) and a Fellow of the Medieval Academy of America. Caviness has been the recipient of the John Nicholas Brown Prize and the Haskins Medal of the Medieval Academy of America.
