= Leah DeVun =

American contemporary artist and historian

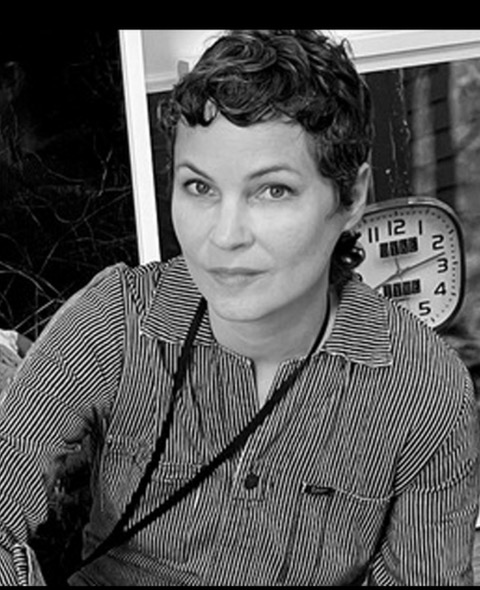
- Historian; Photographer; Artist; Writer
- Occupations: Historian; Photographer; Artist; Writer

Academic background
- Education: Columbia University – Ph.D. University of Washington – B.A.

Academic work
- Discipline: Women's and Gender History
- Institutions: Rutgers University

Leah DeVun (born 1973) is an American author and artist whose work focuses on gender, LGBTQ communities, and the politics of the body. DeVun has been featured or interviewed in Artforum, New York Times, HuffPost, People MagazineHyperallergic, Out, Art Papers, Feature Shoot, Redbook, and Slate, and venues presenting her work include Baxter Street Camera Club, Bemis Center for Contemporary Arts, Blanton Museum of Art, Brooklyn Museum, Houston Center for Photography, Leslie-Lohman Museum, the ONE Archives Gallery and Museum at the University of Southern California, Royal Photographic Society, Stonewall National Museum and Archives, and Tang Teaching Museum and Art Gallery. Her most recent series, “Resemblance,” was selected for Photolucida’s Critical Mass Top 50 and the New York Portfolio Review, and it was the subject of a solo exhibition at Mrs. Gallery in New York. DeVun is also a professor of History and Women’s, Gender, and Sexuality Studies at Rutgers University.

== Education and Career ==
Leah DeVun received a Bachelor of Arts with honors from the University of Washington, Seattle, and earned a Ph.D. from Columbia University in 2004. She worked at Sarah Lawrence College, Texas A&M University, and currently teaching at Rutgers University. She creates writes books about LGBTQ history, science and medicine, religion, utopian communities, and gender and the body. DeVun is the author of the award-winning books The Shape of Sex: Nonbinary Gender from Genesis to the Renaissance (Columbia, 2021) and Prophecy, Alchemy, and the End of Time (Columbia, 2009), and co-editor of "Trans*historicities"(Duke, 2018, with Zeb Tortorici). Her writing has appeared in Radical History Review, GLQ, WSQ, Osiris, ASAP/Journal, postmedieval, Speculum, and a number of books. She has lectured internationally and received grants and fellowships from the National Science Foundation, University of Wisconsin-Madison, UCLA, Huntington Library, Stanford Humanities Center, and Institute for Advanced Study.

== Academic Work ==
DeVun's scholarship focuses on medieval history, the history of science, religion, gender, sexuality, and transgender studies. Her work examines the intersections of medieval intellectual history with the histories of sex, embodiment, and scientific knowledge. Her first monograph, Prophecy, Alchemy, and the End of Time: John of Rupescissa in the Late Middle Ages (2009), examines the fourteenth-century Franciscan friar John of Rupescissa and explores the relationship between apocalyptic thought, alchemy, medicine, and the development of scientific knowledge during the late Middle Ages.

DeVun's second monograph, The Shape of Sex: Nonbinary Gender from Genesis to the Renaissance (2021), traces changing understandings of nonbinary sex and gender in Europe between approximately 200 and 1400 CE. The book explores theological, legal, medical, literary, and scientific texts to examine how concepts of nonbinary embodiment shaped ideas about humanity, religion, race, and sexuality. It received the American Academy of Religion's Award of Excellence in Historical Studies, the Medieval Academy of America Haskins Medal, and the History of Science Society Margaret W. Rossiter Prize, and was a finalist for the Lambda Literary Award. DeVun has also co-edited, with Zeb Tortorici, a special issue of TSQ: Transgender Studies Quarterly devoted to transgender histories before the emergence of modern terminology.

== Artwork ==
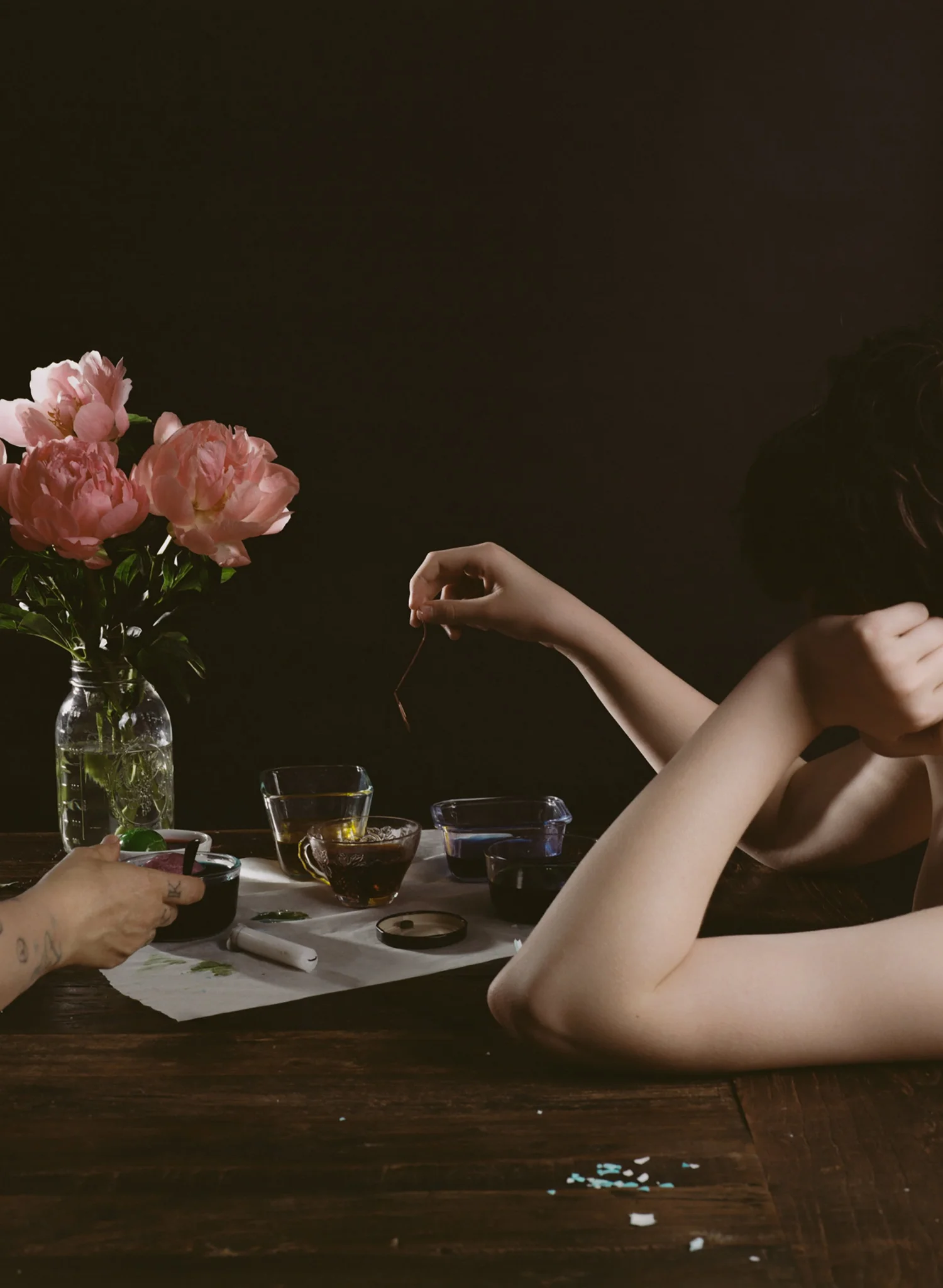
Easter (2025), a photograph from Leah DeVun's Resemblance series, exhibited at Mrs. Gallery in 2025.

DeVun's photographic practice explores queer and transgender embodiment, community-building, belonging, and the relationship between identity, photography, and visual culture. She has identified the loss of her family's photograph collection during a hurricane in Louisiana as a formative influence on her artistic practice, describing photography as a means of preserving memory, history, and personal relationships. Her work frequently examines family archives, self-portraiture, and domestic spaces to explore questions of identity, reproduction, and belonging.

DeVun's work combines documentary photography with conceptual self-portraiture to examine queer kinship, gender, reproduction, and the politics of visual representation. Across projects such as Lesbian Land (2010-2015) and Resemblance, she explores themes of resemblance, doubling, and identity, using domestic spaces, portraits, and mirrors to question normative understandings of family and social belonging. Critics have noted her interest in the relationship between people, place, and the ways photographs construct identity and community.

In the Age of Mechanical Reproduction (2017) is a photographic series by DeVun exploring the role of medical technologies in breastfeeding and infant care. Through images of breast pumps, tubes, and other devices, the series examines the intersections of technology, reproduction, and caregiving, and considers how such technologies complicate conventional ideas about the "natural" body and motherhood.

== Awards and Honors ==
DeVun's scholarship has received several distinctions, including the Award of Excellence in Historical Studies from the American Academy of Religion, the Haskins Medal from the Medieval Academy of America, and the Margaret W. Rossiter Prize from the History of Science Society. The Shape of Sex was also recognized as a finalist for the Lambda Literary Award and received an Honorable Mention for the John Boswell Prize from the Committee on LGBTQ History.

In 2024, DeVun’s photography was longlisted for the Aperture Portfolio Prize. In 2025, DeVun received a NYSCA/NYFA Artist Fellowship from the New York Foundation for the Arts (NYFA) and the New York State Council on the Arts (NYSCA).
