= John Van Engen =

American historian

- Occupation: historian
- Awards: Guggenheim Fellow (1984); Berlin Prize (2011); John Gilmary Shea Prize (2009); Otto Gründler Book Prize (2010); Haskins Medal (2013)

Academic background
- Education: Calvin College (BA); University of California, Los Angeles (PhD)

John H. Van Engen is an American historian who focuses on the religious and intellectual culture of the European Middle Ages. He is Andrew V. Tackes Professor Emeritus of Medieval History at the University of Notre Dame.

== Life ==
He graduated from Calvin College, with a BA, and from University of California, Los Angeles, with a PhD (1976), where he studied with Gerhart Ladner. He also studied at Heidelberg University, with Peter Classen. He joined the faculty of the University of Notre Dame in 1977, and served as director of the Medieval Institute there from 1986 to 1998. He retired in 2017.

== Awards ==
He is a 1984 Guggenheim Fellow, and 2011 Berlin Prize Fellow. His book, Sisters and Brothers of the Common Life: The Devotio Moderna and the World of the Later Middle Ages (University of Pennsylvania Press, 2008) won the 2009 John Gilmary Shea Prize, the 2010 Otto Gründler Book Prize, and the 2013 Haskins Medal.

== Works ==
- Rupert of Deutz. University of California Press. 1983. ISBN 0-520-04577-7.
- Devotio Moderna. Paulist Press. 1988. ISBN 978-0-8091-2962-1.
- Educating people of faith: exploring the history of Jewish and Christian communities. Wm. B. Eerdmans Publishing. 2004. ISBN 978-0-8028-4936-6.
- Sisters and Brothers of the Common Life: The Devotio Moderna and the World of the Late Middle Ages. University of Pennsylvania Press. 2008. ISBN 978-0-8122-4119-8.
- Thomas F. X. Noble, John Van Engen (eds), European Transformations: The Long Twelfth Century, University of Notre Dame Press, 2012, ISBN 978-0-268-03610-2
