= Caroline Walker Bynum =

American historian

Caroline Walker Bynum, FBA (born May 10, 1941, in Atlanta, Georgia) is a medieval scholar from the United States. She is a University Professor emerita at Columbia University and Professor emerita of Western Medieval History at the Institute for Advanced Study in Princeton, New Jersey. She was the first woman to be appointed University Professor at Columbia. She is former Dean of Columbia's School of General Studies, served as president of the American Historical Association in 1996. She was President of the Medieval Academy of America in 1997–1998.

== Education and career ==
Bynum attended Radcliffe College before completing a bachelor's degree with high honors in history at the University of Michigan in 1962, and master's and doctoral degrees from Harvard University in 1969. Her honors include the Jefferson Lecture, a MacArthur Fellowship, and fourteen honorary degrees including degrees from the University of Chicago in 1992, Harvard University in 2005, the University of Michigan and the University of Pennsylvania in 2007. She taught at Harvard University from 1969 to 1976, the University of Washington from 1976 to 1988, Columbia University from 1988 to 2003, and the Institute for Advanced Study from 2003 to 2011. In 2015, she was the Robert Janson-La Palme Visiting Lecturer in the Department of Art and Archaeology at Princeton University.

== Thought ==
Bynum's work has focused on the way medieval people, especially women, understood the nature of the human body and its physicality in the context of larger theological questions and spiritual pursuits. Bynum's work centers around late-medieval Europe. Her focus on female piety has brought increased attention to the role of women in medieval Europe.

== Works ==
- Dissimilar Similitudes: Devotional Objects in Late Medieval Europe (New York: Zone Books, 2020) ISBN 9781942130710
- Christian Materiality: An Essay on Religion in Late Medieval Europe (New York: Zone Books, 2011)
- Wonderful Blood: Theology and Practice in Late Medieval Northern Germany and Beyond (Philadelphia, 2006), winner of the American Academy of Religion's 2007 Award for Excellence, the 2009 Gründler Prize, and the Haskins Medal of the Medieval Academy of America in 2011.
- Metamorphosis and Identity (New York: Zone Books, 2005)
- The Resurrection of the Body in Western Christianity, 200–1336 (New York: Columbia University Press, 1995; revised and expanded 2017); received the Ralph Waldo Emerson Prize from Phi Beta Kappa, and the Jacques Barzun Prize of the American Philosophical Society.
- Fragmentation and Redemption: Essays on Gender and the Human Body in Medieval Religion (New York: Zone Books, 1990), winner of the Trilling Prize for the Best Book by a Columbia Faculty Member and the Award for Excellence in the Study of Religion in the Analytical-Descriptive Category from the American Academy of Religion.
- Holy Feast and Holy Fast: The Religious Significance of Food to Medieval Women (Berkeley: University of California Press, 1988), winner of the Governor's Writer's Day Award of the State of Washington and the Philip Schaff prize of the American Society of Church History.
- Jesus as Mother: Studies in the Spirituality of the High Middle Ages (Berkeley: University of California Press, 1984)
- Docere verbo et exemplo: An Aspect of Twelfth-Century Spirituality. Harvard Theological Studies 31 (Missoula: Scholars Press: 1979)

== Awards and prizes ==
- Distinguished Teacher Award from the University of Washington (1981)
- Berkshire Prize (1985)
- MacArthur Fellowship (1986–1989)
- Governor's Writers Day Award (1988)
- Philip Schaff Prize (1989)
- Trilling Prize (1992)
- Membership to the American Academy of Arts and Sciences (1993)
- Membership to the American Philosophical Society (1995)
- Ralph Waldo Emerson Prize (1995)
- Barzun Prize (1996)
- Columbia University, Presidential Award for Outstanding Teaching (1997)
- Jefferson Lecturer (1999)
- Harvard University, Centennial Medal of the Harvard Graduate School (2001)
- Mark van Doren Teaching Award of Columbia College (2002)
- American Society of Church History, Distinguished Career Award (2005)
- Award for Excellence in the Study of Religion (2007 and 1992)
- Gründler Prize (2009)
- Haskins Medal (2011)
- Pour le Mérite (2012)
- Knight Commander's Cross of the Order of Merit of the Federal Republic of Germany (2013)
- Hebrew University, Doctor Honoris Causa (2015)

In 2016 Bynum was elected a Fellow of the Ecclesiastical History Society. In July 2017, Bynum was elected a Corresponding Fellow of the British Academy (FBA), the United Kingdom's national academy for the humanities and social sciences.
