= Anne Walters Robertson =

American musicologist (born 1952)

- Born: August 1, 1952 (age 74); Houston, Texas, U.S.
- Occupation: Musicologist
- Awards: Guggenheim Fellowship (1991); Haskins Medal (2006)

Academic background
- Education: University of Houston; Rice University; Yale University
- Thesis: Music and liturgy at the Abbey of Saint-Denis, 567-1567: a survey of the primary sources (1984)
- Doctoral advisor: Craig M. Wright

Academic work
- Discipline: Musicology
- Sub-discipline: Medieval music
- Institutions: University of Chicago

Anne Walters Robertson (born August 1, 1952) is an American musicologist who specializes in medieval music from the Early Christianity era to the Late Middle Ages. A 1991 Guggenheim Fellow, she is the author of The Service-Books of the Royal Abbey of Saint-Denis (1991), the winner of the 1995 John Nicholas Brown Prize, and Guillaume de Machaut and Reims (2002), which won the 2003 Otto Kinkeldey Award and 2006 Haskins Medal. She is Claire Dux Swift Distinguished Service Professor of Music at the University of Chicago.

== Biography ==
Anne Walters Robertson was born on August 1, 1952, in Houston, Texas. She attended St. Thomas' Episcopal School, graduating in 1970. She graduated from the University of Houston (UH) with a Bachelor of Music (1974) and a Master of Music (1976). She was an instructor in music at the UH from 1976 to 1977. She pursued further studies at the Shepherd School of Music at Rice University where she graduated with a second Master of Music (1979).

She later went to Yale University, where she obtained her MPhil (1981) and PhD (1984); her doctoral dissertation Music and liturgy at the Abbey of Saint-Denis, 567-1567: a survey of the primary sources was supervised by Craig M. Wright. She moved to the University of Chicago in 1984, where she was in a visiting position in 1984. She was promoted to assistant professor in 1985 and associate professor in 1990, and a professor in 1996; eventually became Claire Dux Swift Distinguished Service Professor of Music. She also served as chair of the UChicago Department of Music from 1992 to 1998, in 2008, and from 2014 to 2016, as well as dean of the Division of the Humanities from 2016 until 2023 and deputy provost for research and education from 2001 to 2004.

Robertson specializes in medieval music from the Early Christianity era to the Late Middle Ages, particularly with one of her themes being the royal family of France. She won two early-career scholarly article awards: the 1987 Van Courtlandt Elliott Prize and 1989 Alfred Einstein Award. She was awarded a Guggenheim Fellowship in 1991, for "a study of music and ritual in medieval Reims". The same year, she released the book The Service-Books of the Royal Abbey of Saint-Denis, which explores the history of music and ritual in the Paris suburb of Saint-Denis, Seine-Saint-Denis; she won the 1995 John Nicholas Brown Prize for that book. She later won the 2003 Otto Kinkeldey Award and 2006 Haskins Medal for her 2002 book Guillaume de Machaut and Reims, a monograph on the composer Guillaume de Machaut. She also won the 2007 H. Colin Slim Award for another scholarly article she wrote. She was appointed Fellow of the American Academy of Arts and Sciences in 2008. She was president of the American Musicological Society from 2011 until 2012. She was elected to the American Philosophical Society in 2015.

== Bibliography ==
- The Service-Books of the Royal Abbey of Saint-Denis (1991)
- Guillaume de Machaut and Reims (2002)
