= Larry Benson =

Professor of medieval literature at Harvard University

Larry D. Benson, ca. 1980.

Larry Dean Benson (1929–2015) was a Korean War veteran and professor of medieval literature at Harvard University. Serving twice as the dean of Harvard's Department of English, Benson was one of the most accomplished American medievalists of the twentieth century.

== Early life and education ==
Born in 1929, Benson enlisted in the United States Marine Corps before completing high school, serving a five-year tour that included action in Korea during the invasion of 1950. After his service, he pursued an undergraduate degree at Arizona State University and earned his Ph.D. at the University of California, Berkeley in 1959.

== Academic career ==
Benson joined Harvard University in 1959, beginning a 45-year tenure that included two terms as chair of the Department of English and Senior Tutor of Quincy House (Harvard College). He retired in 1999 as the Francis Lee Higginson Professor of English, Emeritus.

Benson's scholarship focused on Old and Middle English literature. He wrote and edited numerous books, including Art and Tradition in 'Sir Gawain and the Green Knight' (1965), King Arthur's Death: The Middle English 'Stanzaic Morte Arthur' and 'Alliterative Morte Arthure' (1974), and Malory's Le Morte d'Arthur (1976). His most famous work, The Riverside Chaucer (1987), is the authoritative modern edition of the complete works of Geoffrey Chaucer. Benson served as the general editor, coordinating contributions from a network of scholars.

== Contributions to digital humanities ==
A pioneer in digital humanities, Benson recognized the potential of machine-readable texts before even the advent of the term itself. At a time when email was still a novelty, Benson taught himself to code Unix. After completing The Riverside Chaucer, Benson adapted the computer tapes into tools for teaching and research. This effort led to A Glossarial Concordance to 'The Riverside Chaucer' (1993) and the creation of The Geoffrey Chaucer Website. His Chaucer website, which went up in the 1990s, has accumulated over 83 million visits from students across the world since its launch in 2004.

== Teaching and mentorship ==
Benson was a dynamic lecturer whose Core course on The Canterbury Tales regularly drew hundreds of students. Teaching at Harvard from 1960 to his retirement in 1999, Benson taught everything from surveys to specialized seminars, even extending his tenure to teach at Harvard's Extension School until 2009. According to former students, Benson's teaching style was characterized by nervous energy, pacing, jingling coins in his pockets; through his own penetrating intelligence he was able to convey the brilliance, humor, and humanity of Chaucer.

He founded the Medieval Doctoral Conference in the late 1970s to foster a scholarly community among graduate students and faculty. These weekly gatherings combined lunch discussions and academic presentations, creating a supportive and collaborative environment that continues to this day.

== Legacy and honors ==
Benson's many honors included election to the American Academy of Arts and Sciences in 1982 and being named a fellow of the Medieval Academy of America in 1974. He served on the editorial boards of numerous academic journals and projects.

Known for his self-deprecating manner, Benson's colleagues and students remembered him as a scholar of immense range and depth. His distinctive gifts included a capacious memory, meticulous judgment, and an ability to blend philological precision with literary insight.

== Personal life ==
Benson was known for his love of sabbaticals, spent researching in Florence, Italy. In his free time, he enjoyed cooking Mexican food, bird watching from his home in Lexington, Massachusetts, and watching the Red Sox invariably lose. Furthermore, he was deeply devoted to his family. He was predeceased by his wife, Margaret, and his son, Gavin. He is survived by three children—Cassandra, Amanda, and Geoffrey—ten grandchildren, and one great-grandchild Paxton.

== Bibliography ==
1. Sir Gawain and the Green Knight: a close verse translation Benson, Larry Dean [Publ.]. - Morgantown (2012)

2. King Arthur's death: the Middle English Stanzaic Morte Arthur and Alliterative Morte Arthure Benson, Larry Dean [Publ.]. - Exeter (1995)

3. Contradictions: From Beowulf to Chaucer. Selected Studies Benson, Larry Dean. Anderson, Theodore Murdock • Barney, Stephen A. [Publ.]. - Aldershot (1995)

4. A Glossarial Concordance to the Riverside Chaucer (Vol. 1-2) Benson, Larry Dean. - New York, NY (1993)

5. The Riverside Chaucer Geoffrey Chaucer. Benson, Larry Dean [Publ.]. - Boston, Mass. (1987)

6. The Wisdom of Poetry: Essays in Early English Literature in Honor of Morton W. Bloomfield Benson, Larry Dean • Wenzel, Siegfried [Publ.]. - Kalamazoo, Mich. (1982)

7. Chivalric literature: essays on relations between literature and life in the later middle ages Benson, Larry Dean • Leyerle, John [Publ.]. - Kalamazoo, Mich. (1980)

8. Malory's "Morte Darthur" Benson, Larry Dean. - Cambridge, Mass. [u.a.] (1976)

9. The Learned and the Lewed: Studies in Chaucer and Medieval Literature Benson, Larry Dean [Publ.]. - Cambridge, Mass. (1974)

10. The Literary Context of Chaucer's Fabliaux: Text and Translation. The Library of Literature Benson, Larry Dean • Andersson, Theodore Murdock [Publ.]. - Indianapolis, Ind. (1971)

11. Art and Tradition in Sir Gawain and the Green Knight Benson, Larry Dean. - New Brunswick (1965)

12. The "love-tydynges" in Chaucer's House of Fame Benson, Larry Dean. (1999) - In: Chaucer's Dream Visions and Shorter Poems p. 221-241

13. The Beginnings of Chaucer's English Style Benson, Larry Dean. (1996) - In: The Challenge of Periodization. Old Paradigms and New Perspectives p. 29-49

14. The 'Love-Tydynges' in Chaucer's House of Fame Benson, Larry Dean. (1995) - In: Benson, Contradictions p. 198-216

15. The Order of The Canterbury Tales Benson, Larry Dean. (1995) - In: Benson, Contradictions p. 100-140

16. The Pagan Coloring of Beowulf Benson, Larry Dean. (1995) - In: Benson, Contradictions p. 15-31

17. Introduction Benson, Larry Dean. (1995) - In: Benson, Contradictions p. VIII-XVI

18. The Beginnings of Chaucer's English Style Benson, Larry Dean. (1995) - In: Benson, Contradictions p. 243-265

19. Chaucer's Spelling Reconsidered Benson, Larry Dean. (1995) - In: Benson, Contradictions p. 70-99

20. Courtly Love and Chivalry in the Later Middle Ages Benson, Larry Dean. (1995) - In: Benson, Contradictions p. 294-313

21. Bibliography of the Publications of Larry D. Benson Benson, Larry Dean. (1995) - In: Benson, Contradictions p. XX-XXIII

22. The Originality of Beowulf Benson, Larry Dean. (1995) - In: Benson, Contradictions p. 32-69

23. The Authorship of St. Erkenwald Benson, Larry Dean. (1995) - In: Benson, Contradictions p. 141-154

24. The Occasion of The Parliament of Fowls Benson, Larry Dean. (1995) - In: Benson, Contradictions p. 175-197

25. The Date of the Alliterative Morte Arthure Benson, Larry Dean. (1995) - In: Benson, Contradictions p. 155-174

26. The Tournament in the Romances of Chretien de Troyes and L'Histoire de Guillaume le Marechal Benson, Larry Dean. (1995) - In: Benson, Contradictions p. 266-293

27. The pagan coloring of "Beowulf" Benson, Larry Dean. (1995) - In: Beowulf. Basic readings p. 35-50

28. The Literary Character of Anglo-Saxon Formulaic Poetry Benson, Larry Dean. (1995) - In: Benson, Contradictions p. 1-14

29. The 'Queynte' Punnings of Chaucer's Critics Benson, Larry Dean. (1995) - In: Benson, Contradictions p. 217-242

30. A Lemmatized Concordance of Chaucer Benson, Larry Dean. (1993) - In: Computer-Based Chaucer Studies p. 141-160

31. Chaucer's spelling reconsidered Benson, Larry Dean. (1992) - In: English manuscript studies 1100-1700 vol. 3 (1992) p. 1-28

32. The Literary Character of Anglo-Saxon Formulaic Poetry Benson, Larry Dean. (1990) - In: Oral-Formulaic Theory. A Folklore Casebook p. 227-242

33. Chaucer and courtly speech Benson, Larry Dean. (1988) - In: Genres, Themes and Images in English Literature from the Fourteenth to the Fifteenth Century p. 11-30

34. The "love-tydynges" in Chaucer's House of Fame Benson, Larry Dean. (1986) - In: Chaucer in the Eighties p. 3-22

35. The "queynte" punnings of Chaucer's critics Benson, Larry Dean. (1984) - In: Studies in the age of Chaucer. Proceedings vol. 1 (1984) p. 23-50

36. Courtly love and chivalry in the later Middle Ages Benson, Larry Dean. (1984) - In: Fifteenth-Century Studies. Recent Essays p. 237-257

37. The occasion of The Parliament of Fowls. Benson, Larry Dean. (1982) - In: Essays Morton W. Bloomfield p. 123-144, 283-288

38. The order of "The Canterbury tales" Benson, Larry Dean. (1981) - In: Studies in the age of Chaucer vol. 3 (1981) p. 77-117

39. The tournament in the romances of Chrétien de Troyes and l'Histoire de Guillaume le maréchal Benson, Larry Dean. (1980) - In: Chivalric Literature p. 1-24, 147-152

40. The date of the Alliterative Morte Arthure Benson, Larry Dean. (1976) - In: Studies Lillian Herlands Hornstein p. 19-40

41. A reader's guide to writings on Chaucer Benson, Larry Dean. (1974) - In: Brewer, Geoffrey Chaucer p. 321-372

42. The Originality of "Beowulf" Benson, Larry Dean. (1970) - In: Harvard English studies vol. 1 (1970) p. 1-44

43. The style of Sir Gawain Benson, Larry Dean. (1968) - In: Critical Studies of Sir Gawain and the Green Knight p. 109-124

44. Le Morte Darthur Benson, Larry Dean. (1968) - In: Critical Approaches to Six Major English Works. Beowulf Through Paradise Lost p. 81-131

45. The meaning of Sir Gawain and the Green Knight Benson, Larry Dean. (1968) - In: Critical Studies of Sir Gawain and the Green Knight p. 295-306

46. The Pagan Coloring of Beowulf Benson, Larry Dean. (1967) - In: Old English Poetry. Fifteen Essays p. 193-213

47. The literary character of Anglo-Saxon formulaic poetry Benson, Larry Dean. (1966) - In: Publications of the Modern Language Association of America vol. 81 (1966) p. 334-341

48. The authorship of "St. Erkenwald" Benson, Larry Dean. (1965) - In: Journal of English and Germanic Philology vol. 64 (1965) p. 393-405

49. Chaucer's historical present, its meanings and uses Benson, Larry Dean. (1961) - In: English studies. A journal of English language and literature vol. 4 (1961) p. 65-77

50. The source of the beheading episode in "Sir Gawain and the Green Knight" Benson, Larry Dean. (1961 - 1962) - In: Modern philology vol. 59 (1961/62) p. 1-12 https://www.jstor.org/stable/434930

51. The "Rede Wynde" in "The Siege of Jerusalem" Benson, Larry Dean. (1960) - In: Notes and queries Ser. NS, vol. 7 (1960) p. 363-364

52. The use of a physical viewpoint in Berners' Froissart Benson, Larry Dean. (1959) - In: Modern language quarterly vol. 20 (1959) p. 333-338

For a full list of works by Larry Dean Benson, see: Regesta Imperii Author Index.
