= John Connelly (historian) =

American historian

John Francis Connelly is an American historian and professor at the University of California, Berkeley. His interests include modern East and Central European history, comparative education and the history of nationalism.

== Awards and honors ==
- 2001 George Louis Beer Prize, American Historical Association: Captive University: The Sovietization of East German, Czech, and Polish Higher Education, 1945-1956.
- 2012 John Gilmary Shea Prize, American Catholic Historical Association: From Enemy to Brother: The Revolution in Catholic Teaching on the Jews, 1933-1965

== Bibliography ==
- The Sovietization of East German, Czech, and Polish Higher Education, 1945-1956. University of North Carolina Press. 2000. ISBN 0807848654.
- Universities Under Dictatorship. Pennsylvania State University Press. 2005. ISBN 0-271-02695-2.
- From Enemy to Brother: The Revolution in Catholic Teaching on the Jews, 1933-1965. Harvard University Press. 2008. ISBN 978-0-6740-5782-1.
- From Peoples into Nations: A History of Eastern Europe. Princeton University Press. 2020. ISBN 978-0691208954.
- Connelly, John (1999). "Nazis and Slavs: From Racial Theory to Racist Practice". Central European History. 32 (1). Cambridge University Press: 1–33. doi:10.1017/S0008938900020628. PMID 20077627. S2CID 41052845.
