= John Gilmary Shea Prize =

Annual award

The John Gilmary Shea Prize is an annual award given by the American Catholic Historical Association for the most original and distinguished contribution to knowledge of the history of the Catholic Church. Established in 1945, it is named in honor of the nineteenth-century Catholic historian John Gilmary Shea.

Past Shea Prize awardees include the following:

- 2023: Jeroen Dewulf, Afro-Atlantic Catholics: America’s First Black Christians
- 2022: Brenna Moore, Kindred Spirits: Friendship and Resistance at the Edges of Modern Catholicism
- 2021: Theresa Keeley, Reagan’s Gun-Toting Nuns: The Catholic Conflict Over Cold War Human Rights Policy in Central America
- 2020: Elizabeth Foster, African Catholic: Decolonization and the Transformation of the Church
- 2019: Karin Vélez, The Miraculous Flying House of Loreto: Spreading Catholicism in the Early Modern World
- 2018: Michelle Armstrong-Partida, Defiant Priests Domestic Unions, Violence, and Clerical Masculinity in Fourteenth-Century Catalunya
- 2017: William B. Taylor, Theater of a Thousand Wonders: History of Miraculous Images and Shrines in New Spain
- 2016: Katrina B. Olds, Forging the Past: Invented Histories in Counter-Reformation Spain
- 2015: Maureen C. Miller, Clothing the Clergy: Virtue and Power in Medieval Europe, c. 800-1200
- 2014: John W. O'Malley, Trent: What Happened at the Council
- 2013: Charles Keith, Catholic Vietnam: A Church from Empire to Nation
- 2012: John Connelly, From Enemy to Brother: The Revolution in Catholic Teaching on the Jews, 1933-1965
- 2011: Ulrich L. Lehner, Enlightened Monks: The German Benedictines, 1740-1803
- 2010: Neal Pease, Rome’s Most Faithful Daughter: The Catholic Church and Independent Poland 1914 – 1939
- 2009: John Van Engen, Sisters and Brothers of the Common Life: The Devotio Moderna and the World of the Later Middle Ages

== See also ==
- List of history awards
