= Speculum (journal) =

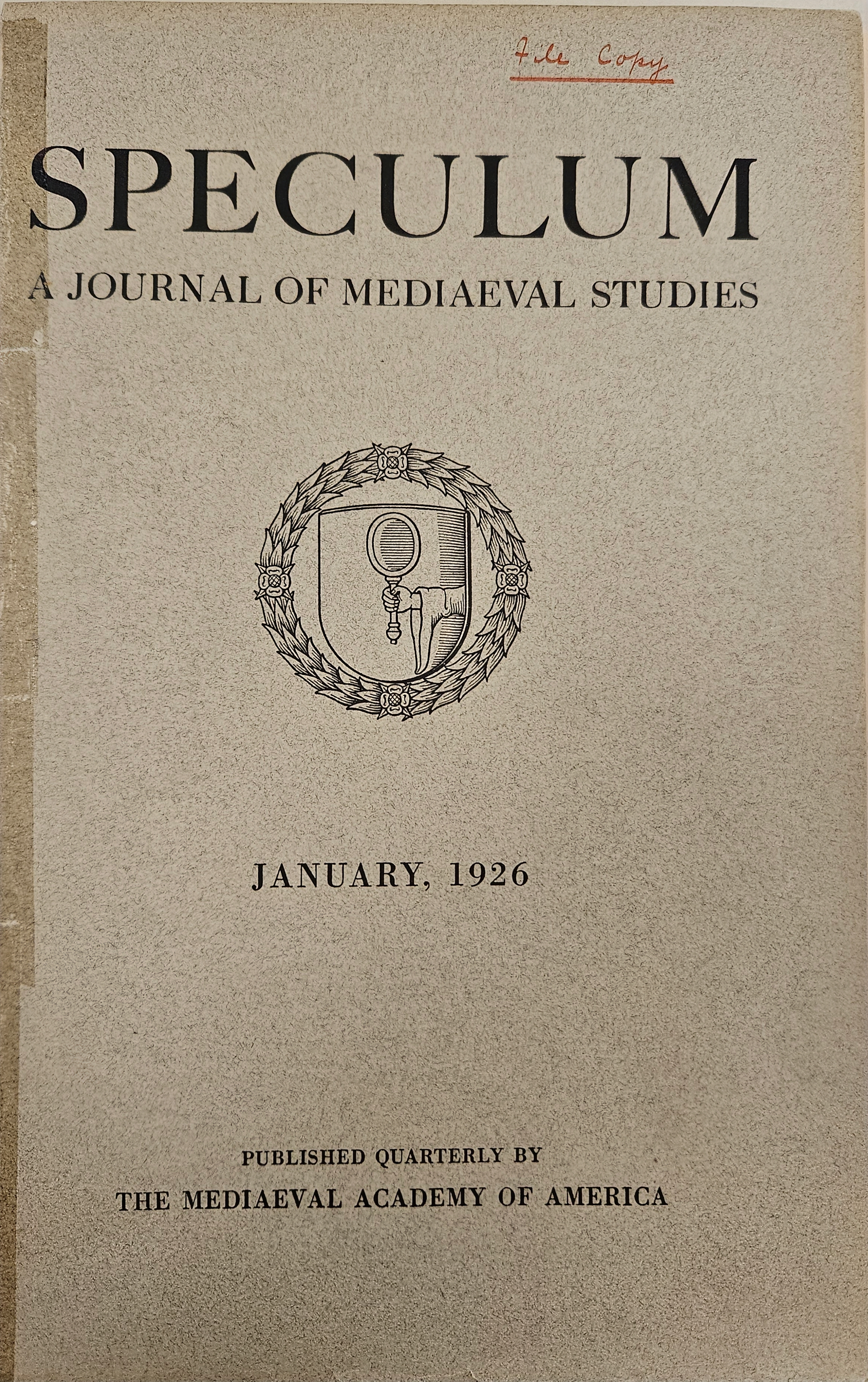
- Discipline: Medieval studies
- Language: English
- Edited by: Barbara Newman

Publication details
- History: 1926–present
- Publisher: University of Chicago Press
- Frequency: Quarterly

Standard abbreviations
- ISO 4: Speculum

Indexing
- ISSN: 0038-7134 (print); 2040-8072 (web)
- LCCN: 27015446
- JSTOR: 00387134
- OCLC no.: 35801878

Links
- Journal homepage; Online access

Speculum: A Journal of Medieval Studies is a quarterly academic journal published by University of Chicago Press on behalf of the Medieval Academy of America. It was established in 1926 by Edward Kennard Rand. The journal's primary focus is on the time period from 500 to 1500 in Western Europe, but also on related subjects such as Byzantine, Hebrew, Arabic, Armenian and Slavic studies. As of 2025, the editor is Barbara Newman.

The organization and its journal were first proposed in 1921 at a meeting of the Modern Language Association, and the journal's focus was interdisciplinary from its beginning, with one reviewer noting a specific interest in Medieval Latin.
