= Medieval Academy of America =

Historical society

- Formation: 1925
- Founder: Edward Kennard Rand; Charles Homer Haskins
- Location: Boston
- Executive Director: Lisa Fagin Davis
- Website: medievalacademy.org
- Formerly called: Mediaeval Academy of America

The Medieval Academy of America (MAA; spelled Mediaeval until c. 1980) is the largest organization in the United States promoting the field of medieval studies. It was founded in 1925 and is based in Boston. The academy publishes the quarterly journal Speculum, and awards prizes, grants, and fellowships such as the Haskins Medal, which is named for Charles Homer Haskins, one of the academy's founders and its second president.

== Overview ==
The academy supports research, publication and teaching in medieval art, archaeology, history, law, literature, music, philosophy, religion, science, social and economic institutions, and all other aspects of the Middle Ages.

The academy was admitted to the American Council of Learned Societies in 1927. It has been affiliated with the American Historical Association since 1989.

The academy maintains a peer-reviewed online database, the Medieval Digital Resources website (MDR).

== Presidents ==
- 1996-1997 John W. Baldwin
- 2001-2002 Andrew Hughes
