= Durham (poem) =

Old English poem about the city of Durham

Durham, also known as De situ Dunelmi, Carmen de situ Dunelmi or De situ Dunelmi et de sanctorum reliquiis quae ibidem continentur carmen compositum, is an anonymous late Old English short poem about the English city of Durham and its relics, which might commemorate the translation of Cuthbert's relics to Durham Cathedral in 1104. Known from the late 12th-century manuscript, Cambridge, University Library, Ff. 1. 27, Durham has been described both as "the last extant poem written in traditional alliterative Old English metrical verse" and as being placed "so conveniently on the customary divide between Old and Middle English that the line can be drawn right down the middle of the poem." (Note: Christopher Cannon; quoted in Appleton and Blurton 2008 (p. 40)) Scholars have dated the poem either to the twelfth century or to some point in the second half of the eleventh century.

Durham is often considered to be a rare Old English example of the genre of encomium urbis, or urban eulogy, and has also been described as elegiac poetry, a riddle and an occasional poem.

== Historical background ==
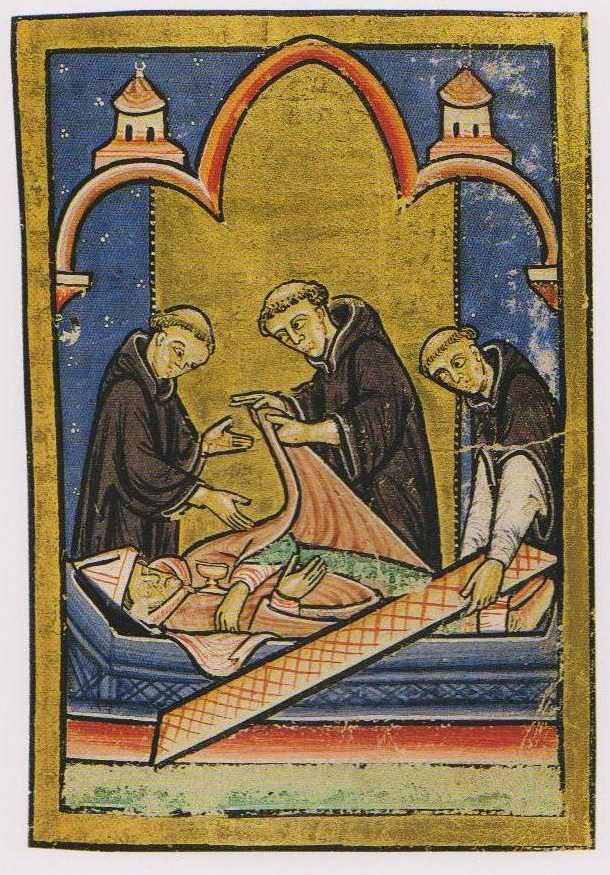
Illustration of the finding of Cuthbert's incorrupt body, from Bede's Life of St Cuthbert

Cuthbert (c. 635 – 687) is a prominent saint associated with northern England, who served as the Bishop of Lindisfarne. Eleven years after his death, his coffin was opened and his body found to be incorrupt, that is, it had miraculously not decayed. In 875, his body was removed from Lindisfarne after an invasion by the Danes led to the monastery being abandoned. After long peregrinations, Durham was founded in around 995 by Aldhun and other followers of Cuthbert's cult. The location, a rocky peninsula surrounded by a loop of the River Wear, was probably chosen for its ease of defence. A stream of pilgrims attended the shrine, a series of churches was built for their use, and a fortified town soon sprang up. Several other relics had accumulated by the time the group settled in Durham, and the remains of several other saints, including Boisil and possibly Bede, were acquired by a sacristan called Alfred Westou in the mid-11th century, Bede allegedly being stolen from its shrine in Jarrow.

After the Norman Conquest, the Anglo-Scandinavian priests originating in Lindisfarne eventually lost ownership of Cuthbert's shrine; however, the transfer of power in Durham to the Normans occurred in stages. William the Conqueror ordered a castle to be built, started around 1072. The first Norman appointee as Bishop of Durham was murdered, and his successor, William of Saint-Calais, established Durham as a Benedictine priory in 1083. Tradition holds that only a single Lindisfarne priest chose to abandon his family to join the new priory. The Anglo-Norman Benedictines continued to venerate Cuthbert. A grandiose new Norman building – the existing Durham Cathedral – was founded as a fitting permanent home for his remains and the other relics in 1093, and the final Anglo-Saxon church or cathedral was demolished. By the time the new cathedral building was sufficiently advanced, William of Saint-Calais had died and the "notorious" Ranulph Flambard had succeeded him as bishop.

Cuthbert's coffin was reopened on 25 August 1104, and ceremonially moved to the unfinished cathedral a few days later. A later eye-witness account of the opening of the coffin is given in Capitula de Miraculis et Translationibus Sancti Cuthberti, which states that the body remained incorrupt more than four centuries post-mortem, and also lists all the other relics found in the coffin, including a linen bag said to contain Bede's remains.

== Structure and contents ==
The poem has 20 or 21 lines, which run continuously even though the subject matter falls into two unequal parts. The first part gives a brief general introduction to the unnamed city and its locale:

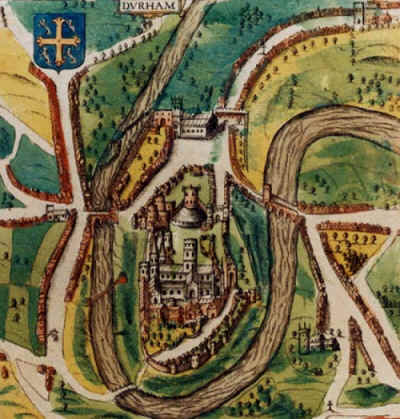
Map of Durham in 1610, showing the cathedral and the River Wear

Is ðeos burch breome geond Breotenrice,
steppa gestaðolad, stanas ymbutan
wundrum gewæxen. Weor ymbeornad,
ea yðum stronge, and ðer inne wunað
feola fisca kyn on floda gemonge.
And ðær gewexen is wudafæstern micel;
wuniad in ðem wycum wilda deor monige,
in deope dalum deora ungerim. (Note: The source for both parts of the Old English text of Durham is Abram 2000.)

The opening first states that the site (Note: The word "burch" is variously translated as "burgh", "fortification", "city" and "town"; the ambiguity might be intentional.) is renowned throughout Britain. The poet describes it as located on a high bluff, surrounded by rocks, with the River Wear flowing around it. The river is said to contain many different kinds of fish. The poem goes on to describe the surrounding countryside as densely wooded, with abundant wild animals. (Note: The summary of the poem's contents (here and below) is based on translations into modern English in Abram 2000, Kendall 1988 and T. O'Donnell 2014, as well as the summary in Grossi 2017; Abram 2000 gives an open-access online translation from Dobbie (note 12, p. 28).) This part of the text shows similarities to two earlier works in Latin, Bede's Ecclesiastical History, where the description relates to the whole of England, and Alcuin's poem praising York, De pontificibus et sanctis Ecclesiae Eboracensis. There is no explicit mention of the cathedral.

These lines are followed by a longer description of the relics to be found there:

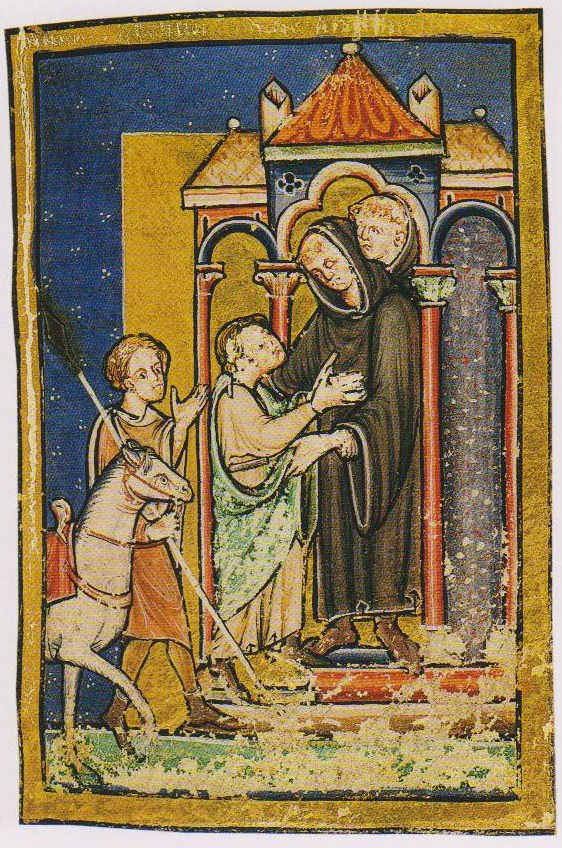
Illustration of Boisil greeting Cuthbert at Melrose Abbey

Is in ðere byri eac bearnum gecyðed
ðe arfesta eadig Cudberch
and ðes clene cyninges heafud,
Osuualdes, Engle leo, and Aidan biscop,
Eadberch and Eadfrið, æðele geferes.
Is ðer inne midd heom Æðelwold biscop
and breoma bocera Beda, and Boisil abbot,
ðe clene Cudberte on gecheðe
lerde lustum, and he his lara wel genom.
Eardiæð æt ðem eadige in in ðem minstre
unarimeda reliquia,
ðær monia wundrum gewurðað, ðes ðe writ seggeð,
midd ðene drihnes wer domes bideð.

The second part opens by saying that everyone knows that the city also contains Cuthbert, the head of King Oswald – described as the "lion of England" – and Bishop Aidan, with his companions Eadberht and Eadfrith. With them within are Bishop Æthelwold, Bede – the renowned scholar – and Abbot Boisil, described as Cuthbert's teacher. Within the minster many other relics are also said to reside. The poem concludes by saying that there many miracles occur, as has been written, and looks forward to the Day of Judgement.

The poem's account of the relics closely parallels that given in Capitula de Miraculis et Translationibus Sancti Cuthberti, preserving the order in which the saints are listed. All of the seven other saints mentioned were closely connected with Cuthbert. There is no mention of the other relics collected by Elfred Westou. The poem's epithet for Bede ("breoma bocera Beda") derives from the 10th-century translation of the Lindisfarne Gospels into Old English.

== Manuscripts and editions ==
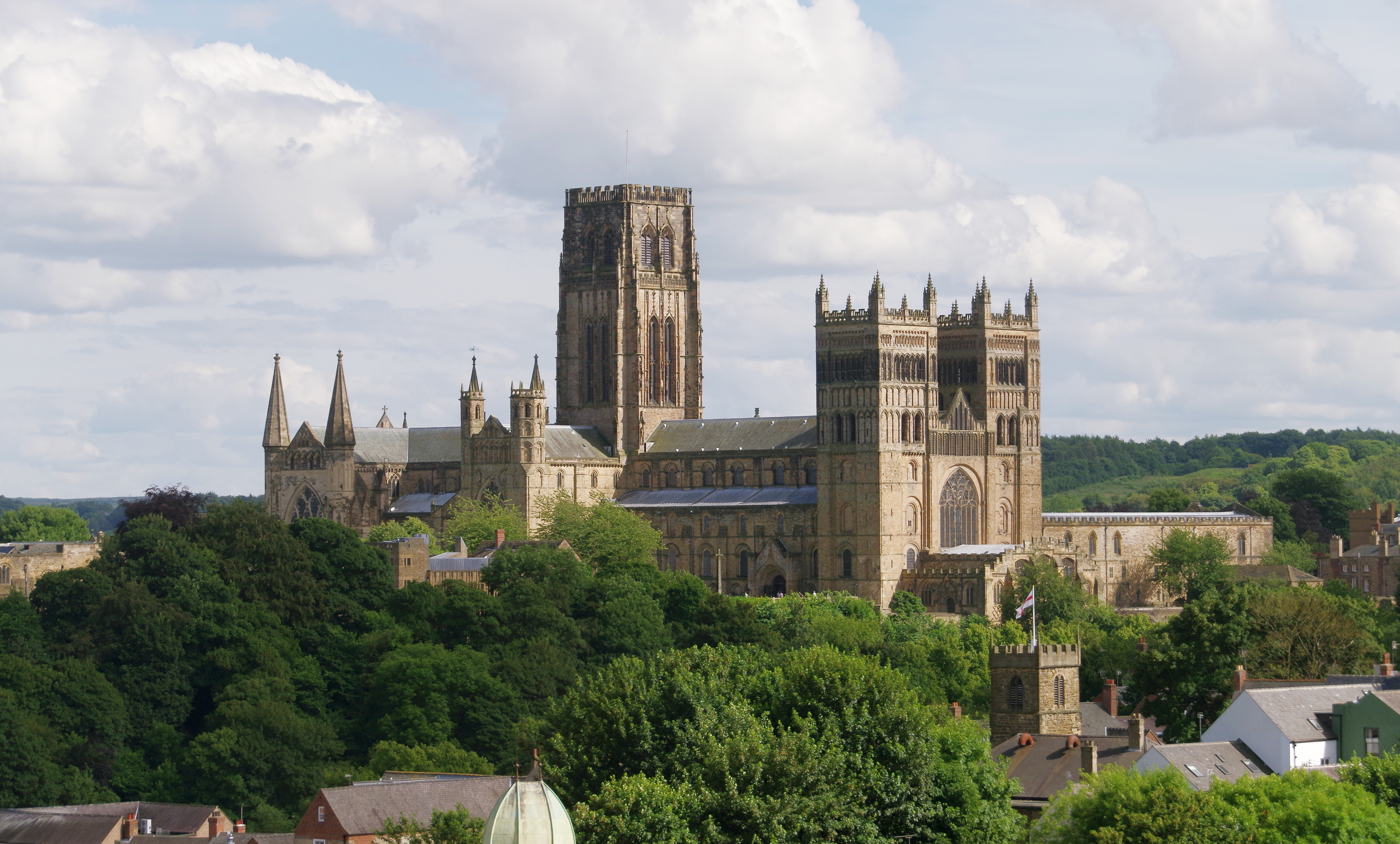
The Norman Durham Cathedral, which houses the relics described in the poem.

The poem is known from a copy in a late 12th-century manuscript, Cambridge, University Library, Ff. 1. 27, believed to have been compiled at Durham Cathedral Priory and now held by the Cambridge University Library. In 1705, George Hickes published a copy made by G. Nicolson from London, British Library, Cotton Vitellius D. xx, a 12th-century manuscript, which was lost in a 1731 house fire. A further transcription, discovered in 1992, was made in 1640 by Franciscus Junius the younger, possibly from an otherwise unknown manuscript. The poem is here accompanied by a Latin translation in the right-hand column. Some variation among these three versions exists.

Durham is the only work in Old English in the Cambridge and Cotton Vitellius manuscripts, and both entitle it in Latin: "De situ Dunelmi et de sanctorum reliquiis quae ibidem continentur carmen compositum". As with other Old English poetry, it is presented as prose, without line breaks. In the Cambridge manuscript, the handwriting of the poem is that of the main transcriber. The poem comes at the end of a large group of texts about Durham; a few lines of subsequent text have been erased, to make the poem conclude the page.

The usual modern edition is that of Elliott Van Kirk Dobbie (1942), published in the Anglo-Saxon Poetic Records. The poem has previously been edited by George Waring (1865), I. H. Hinde (1867), Thomas Arnold (1882), Richard Wülcker (in German; 1921), and others. All pre-date the discovery of the Junius copy.

== Date and author ==
The poem's date is often given as between 1104 and 1109. (Note: See, for example:) The end of this range is fixed by a reference to the poem (Note: Scholars agree that the reference is to Durham.) in Symeon's Historia Dunelmensis Ecclesiae (also known as Libellus de exordio atque procursu istius, hoc est Dunhelmensis, ecclesiae), completed between 1104 and 1115, and probably by 1107. Symeon describes it as an English-language poem on Durham and its relics, and implies that it pre-dated the discovery of Bede's remains by many years.

The beginning of the range is disputed. The poem's 20th-century editors, Wülcker and Dobbie, each suggest that it was written after the translation of Cuthbert's remains in 1104, considering the poem's statement that the relics are "in ðem minstre" to refer to the Norman cathedral. Margaret Schlauch, an early commentator, considers the language to suggest an early 12th century date. Many later scholars concur. H. S. Offler, Thomas O'Donnell and others have, however, suggested that the poem could have been composed as early as around 1050, before the Conquest, when the relics that it lists were all present in Durham and resting in the church which preceded the Norman Cathedral and was equally a “minstre” (making the reference to a “minstre” in the poem at least ambiguous). Moreover, the description of the relics in the poem suggests an arrangement closer to what is known of the secular cathedral, which preceded the Normans, than of the Norman Cathedral.

There is no direct information about the author. Many scholars consider him to have been one of the Benedictine monks at Durham, while O'Donnell has suggested that he might have been among the secular clerks who occupied Durham before the arrival of the monks from Lindisfarne, if the poem is indeed from earlier in the eleventh century. The two groups differ substantially in character: the former Anglo-Norman and monastic, the latter Anglo-Scandinavian and secular. Calvin B. Kendall has speculated that he might have been a scholar.

== Style, language and themes ==
Durham employs traditional alliterative verse. The proportion of half-lines of the C, D and E types is very low (14%) even compared with the other late poems The Battle of Maldon (991) and The Death of Edward (c. 1066) (both around 25%). The poem features interlace and ring structure, as well as extensive and complex word play. The final lines are macaronic: they mix Old English with Latin. Several characteristics of the language might be signs of linguistic drift towards Middle English – including changes in unstressed syllables; some spelling choices, such as burch for the Old English burg/burh; and the inclusion of Latin words such as leo and reliquia – although other interpretations are possible.

Both parts of the poem share the theme of abundance, the location's natural gifts being complemented by the many relics collected together; this theme is also seen in the description of England in Bede's Ecclesiastical History.

== Genre ==
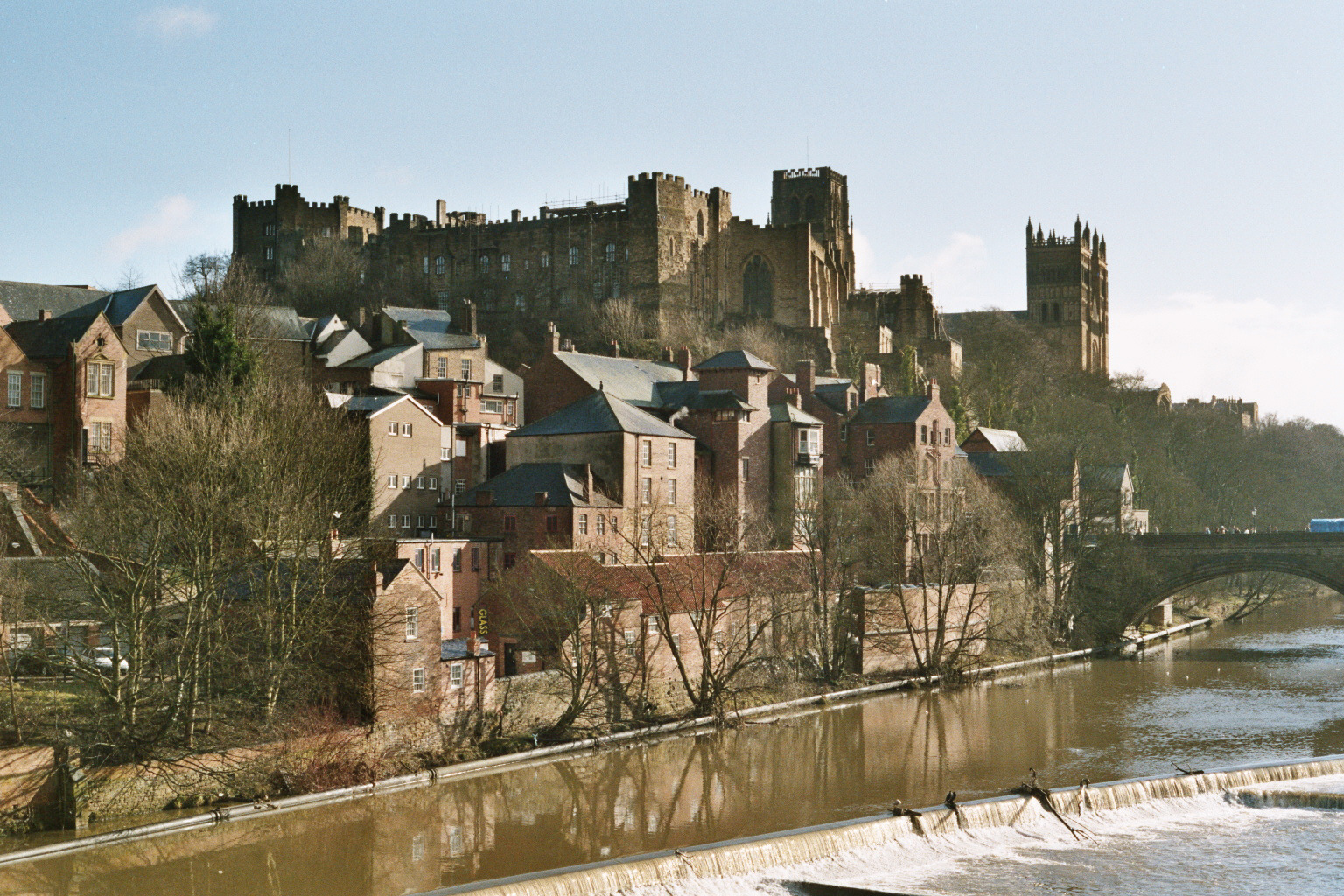
The modern city of Durham is still dominated by its Norman cathedral (right) and castle (centre)

In her "influential" 1941 article on the poem, Schlauch suggests that Durham forms the sole example in Old English poetry (Note: Some subsequent scholarship also classes The Ruin as an Old English encomium urbis. (See, for example, note 7, p. 52 in Blurton 2008)) of the encomium urbis (urban eulogy) genre, a successor to Alcuin's Latin poem praising York, as well as several works on Italian cities; this idea is broadly accepted in much subsequent scholarship. Calvin B. Kendall, Helen Appleton and Heather Blurton have each suggested that Durham is an unusual example of this genre, as it fails to describe the cathedral and other features of the built environment, and does not even include the name of the city that is being praised (the explicit mention of the River Wear fixes the subject as Durham). Lerer sees the poem as adhering equally to the tradition of alliterative elegiac poetry. An earlier Old English poem, The Ruin, which describes a Roman spa, probably Bath, considered by some scholars as another atypical example of the encomium urbis, can equally be considered as an elegy. Christopher Abram notes that only the stone-built cities of York, Bath and Durham have inspired British examples of the encomium urbis.

Kendall and Blurton have each drawn attention to the riddle-like character of the poem. Kendall discusses the poem's "riddling elements", including its extensive use of wordplay, and considers the omission of the city's name to be reminiscent of the riddle genre. Blurton goes further, reading the entire poem as a riddle, and likening its failure to describe the city's most prominent feature – the huge new cathedral – to the failure of Old English riddles to state their solution. She posits that the riddle's solution is "reliquary", and states: "the poem is itself a reliquary for the 'countless relics' it holds ... Durham pushes aside the claims of the new Anglo-Norman cathedral and offers itself as the more appropriate shrine", encompassing not only the relics but also the place itself.

Kendall has additionally suggested that, on the assumption that Durham was composed for the translation ceremony, it might be the earliest English occasional poem.

== Modern critical reception ==
As reviewed previously, considerable scholarship has focused on establishing the poem's date. On the assumption that Durham does originate from c. 1104–9, one or two generations after the Conquest, it has been described by Dobbie, Fred C. Robinson, Nicholas Howe, Joseph Grossi and others as the last surviving work to be composed in Old English traditional alliterative verse. (Note: In the Anglo-Saxon Poetic Records (The Anglo-Saxon Minor Poems, Vol. 6, Dobbie; Columbia University Press, 1942), Dobbie classes it as the "latest of the extant Anglo-Saxon poems in the regular alliterative meter" (quoted in Lerer). Robinson: "our latest specimen of classical OE verse". Howe: "appears to be the latest of the extant Old English poems". Grossi: "the last extant poem written in traditional alliterative Old English metrical verse." Evan: "This restores its significance as the last surviving piece of Anglo-Saxon alliterative verse".) R. D. Fulk and Seth Lerer each distinguish Durham from typical transitional or early Middle English poems, such as The Grave and The Owl and the Nightingale. A few scholars, however, including Christopher Cannon and Thomas Bredehoft, consider it to represent a transition point between Old English and early Middle English poetry. The poem's success considered as traditional alliterative verse is also debated. Lerer states that it "more than competently reproduces the traditional alliterative half-lines of Old English prosody", while Thomas Cable considers the poem to break with the traditional form, "as though the author of Durham were familiar with earlier Old English poetic texts but misunderstood their metrical principles." (Note: Quoted in T. O'Donnell.) Fulk notes that a high proportion of half-lines are defective in metre.

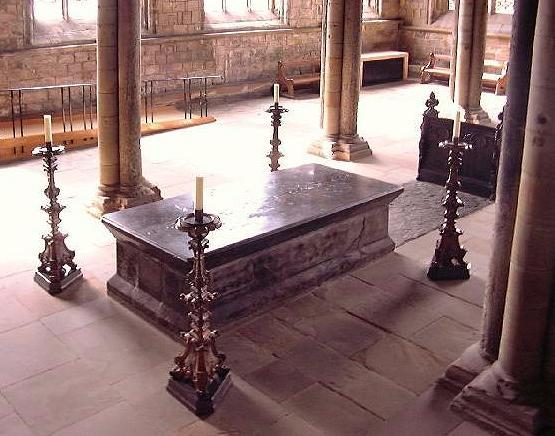
Bede's tomb at Durham Cathedral

Relatively little modern research has focused on the poem's literary aspects. Early 20th-century scholars tended to be dismissive; Schlauch calls it "little more than a class-room assignment," and Charles Leslie Wrenn writes that "though unexpectedly well written technically in the traditional style, it lacks poetic merit of any other kind". (Note: Wrenn 1967; quoted in Grossi 2017) Since the mid-1970s, a reappraisal of its qualities has been ongoing, and Durham has received praise for its structure, technical achievements and wit. D. R. Howlett concludes that it is "a well wrought exercise". Kendall writes that the poem exhibits "unexpected exuberance and wit", and states that "its concentration of wordplay" has "no parallel in the surviving body of Old English poetry." Lerer describes the poem as "supple" with "commanding use of interlace and ring structure, together with its own elaborate word plays, puns and final macaronic lines". Abram describes it as a "neat exposition" of the encomium urbis genre. Peter D. Evan writes that "The poet enriches his work with complex word-play, revealing his skill as a writer and his careful choice of words." Scholars continue to differ on the poem's descriptive qualities; Howe calls the portrayal of Durham's location "vivid", while Blurton considers it to be "so general as to describe absolutely nothing." O'Donnell has argued that the poem's depiction of relics and animate nature aligns it with eleventh-century writing at Durham and expresses a sophisticated understanding of the relationship between people and place.

The possible political intentions behind the poem's creation in Norman Durham have also been probed. Kendall, Grossi and others have focused on how the poem bolsters Durham's prestige as a site for pilgrimage, particularly by underlining its title to the remains of such a well-respected figure as Bede. Blurton discusses the poem as "a political gambit in the power struggles between the monks of Durham Cathedral against the neighboring castle and its powerful bishops".

== See also ==
- Old English literature

== References and notes ==
Notes

Book sources

- Blurton, Heather (4 August 2008), "Reliquia: Writing Relics in Anglo-Norman Durham", in Jeffrey Jerome Cohen (ed.), Cultural Diversity in the British Middle Ages: Archipelago, Island, England, Springer, pp. 39–56, ISBN 9780230614123
- Bonney, Margaret (2005), "Urban origins: The growth and development of Durham to 1250", Lordship and the Urban Community: Durham and Its Overlords, 1250–1540, Cambridge University Press, pp. 9–36, ISBN 9780521022859
- Fulk, R. D. (1992), "Late Developments", A History of Old English Meter, University of Pennsylvania Press, pp. 251–68, ISBN 9780812231571
- Grossi, Joseph (3 August 2017), "Durham", in Siân Echard; Robert Rouse (eds.), The Encyclopedia of Medieval Literature in Britain, John Wiley & Sons, pp. 713–15, doi:10.1002/9781118396957.wbemlb125, ISBN 9781118396957
- Howe, Nicholas (2008), "Conclusion: By Way of Durham", Writing the Map of Anglo-Saxon England: Essays in Cultural Geography, Yale University Press, pp. 225–31, ISBN 9780300119336
- Lerer, Seth (March 2008) [1999], "Old English and its afterlife", in David Wallace (ed.), The Cambridge History of Medieval English Literature, Cambridge University Press, pp. 7–34, doi:10.1017/CHOL9780521444200.003, ISBN 9781139053624
- Rollason, David W. (1998), Symeon of Durham: Historian of Durham and the North, Shaun Tyas, pp. 278–79, ISBN 978-1871615968
