= Alfred Westou =

English priest and relic collector

Alfred, son of Westou (Note: Also Ælfred, Aelfred, Elfred, Alfredus and Aluredus; with his surname also given as Westow and Westowe) (fl. c. 1020 – after 1056) was a medieval English priest and relic collector, active in Northumberland. He is now best known for allegedly stealing the remains of Bede and bringing them in secret to the shrine of St Cuthbert in Durham, although some modern scholars consider this unlikely. He is also documented as having translated the remains of Boisil of Melrose Abbey, as well as numerous northern English minor saints of the 7th and 8th centuries: the anchorites Balther and Bilfrid; Acca, Alchmund and Eata, bishops of Hexham; Oswin, king of Deira; and the abbesses Ebba and Æthelgitha. He served as the sacristan at Cuthbert's shrine under three bishops, and was renowned for his devotion to the saint.

== Biography ==
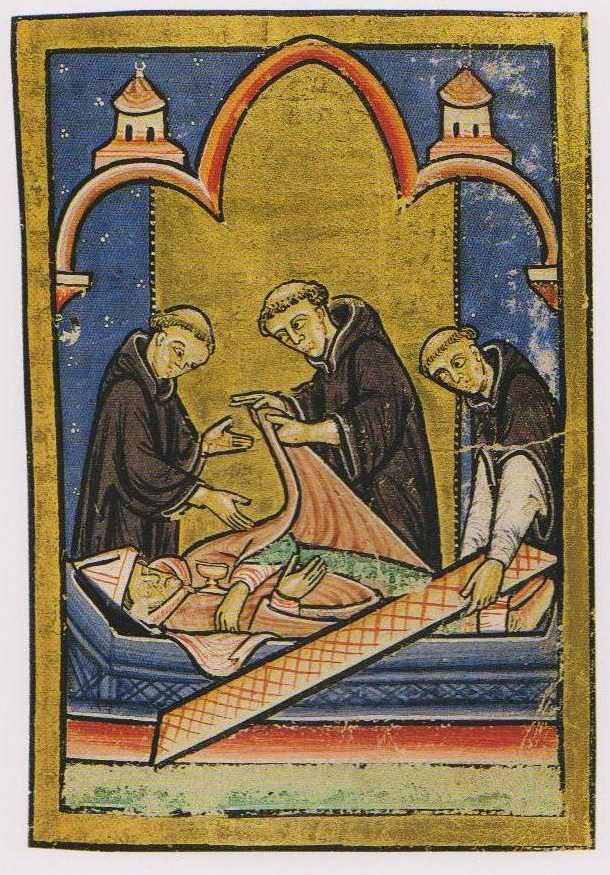
The finding of Cuthbert's incorrupt body, from Bede's Life of St Cuthbert

=== Cuthbert's shrine and the Durham Ecclesia Major ===
Alfred served as sacristan at the shrine of St Cuthbert in Durham during the time of the bishops Edmund, Æthelric and Æthelwine, in the early–mid 11th century. The miraculously incorrupt remains of the saint, who died in 687, were then housed in a large stone church or cathedral referred to as the Ecclesia Major, dedicated in 998 and demolished to make way for the existing Norman cathedral in around 1093.

The early chronicler of Durham's history Symeon of Durham praises Alfred as a pious man and an ideal custodian to Cuthbert's relics, and the later chronicler Reginald of Durham describes him as being "of decent life". His descendant Ailred of Rievaulx describes him as an "active teacher". The modern theologian and historian Benedicta Ward, in her biography of Bede, describes Alfred as a stern teacher to the cathedral's young novices, and states that he was recorded as being respected by the "honest and God-fearing". The modern historian John Crook writes that Alfred was "highly respected" by all three of the Durham bishops. W. M. Aird, on the other hand, describes him as the leader of a group that expelled Bishop Æthelric in around 1045; the bishop was subsequently reinstated by Earl Siward and succeeded by his brother Æthelwine.

For part or all of his time as sacristan, Alfred is reported to have had the sole responsibility for tending to Cuthbert's remains, and several stories have accumulated about his exceptional devotion to Cuthbert. According to Symeon and Reginald, Alfred removed one of Cuthbert's hairs, and found that it miraculously failed to burn. Reginald adds that he frequently opened the coffin to wrap the saint's body in robes, and to trim his fingernails and cut or comb his hair and beard. An ivory liturgical or ordinary comb was among the treasures found in Cuthbert's shrine in 1827. Reginald claims that the two exchanged "familiar speech" at times, stating that Cuthbert gave Alfred detailed instructions on what to do with the various saints' relics he collected. He also recounts a story about a weasel that reared her litter in the reliquary.

Modern historians consider Reginald's uncorroborated material to be of dubious historical value. Calvin B. Kendall has suggested that the story of Alfred tending to the body's hair and nails might have originated in a similar account relating to the Norwegian king and saint Olaf, whose body was said to be tended by his son after his death in 1030; according to Kendall, this story would have been known to Turgot of Durham – the prior of the Durham monastery who oversaw the translation of Cuthbert's remains into the new cathedral in 1104 – as he had previously stayed at the Norwegian court. Ward notes its similarity to stories associated with English saints, including Osmund of Salisbury.

=== Hexham and personal life ===
In addition to his sacristan duties, Alfred also held the church of Hexham, Northumberland, from Bishop Edmund, where his family were hereditary priests. As he lived in Durham, his Hexham duties were delegated first to Gamel the Elder (Gamel Hamel) and then to Gamel iunge. Alfred was married, his wife being the sister of Collan, prior of Hexham. His date of death is unknown, but he is recorded to be still alive at the time of Bishop Æthelwine (1056–71); Crook speculates that he might have died just before the Norman Conquest.

Alfred's son Eilaf Larwa and his grandson, also named Eilaf, each succeeded him as the priest at Hexham. A grandson Aldred or Aluredus is also recorded as a shrine keeper. The saint Ailred, Cistercian abbot of Rievaulx, was Alfred's great-grandson.

== Relic collector ==
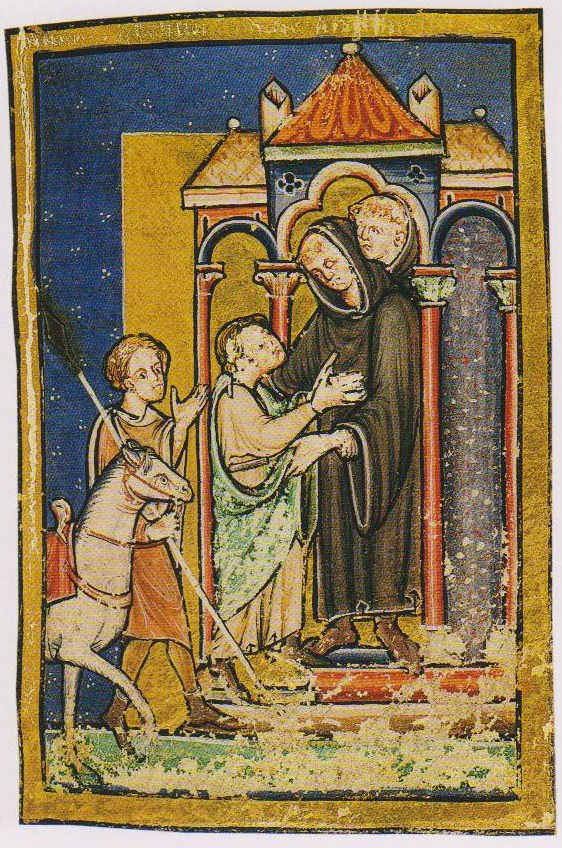
Boisil greeting Cuthbert at Melrose Abbey

Alfred was an assiduous collector of relics of saints for Cuthbert's shrine at Durham as well as the church at Hexham. The medieval specialist Bertram Colgrave describes him as "the arch-relic-hunter", exemplifying the "rage for relics" of his time. Symeon explicitly records his having ceremonially moved (translated) the remains of the following saints, after having been informed of their whereabouts by visions:

- Boisil (died 661) of Melrose Abbey, mentor to Cuthbert, whose remains were deposited in their own shrine in Durham in around 1020;
- Balther (or Baldred; died 756 or 757) of the monastery of Tyningham, named as an anchorite;
- Bilfrid (or Billfrith), a Lindisfarne goldsmith and anchorite known for working the ornate case of the Lindisfarne Gospels, now lost;
- Acca (died 740) and Alchmund (or Alcmund; died 780 or 781), two of the Hexham bishops, who were reburied in the church at Hexham in around 1040; according to some sources, parts of their relics were also translated to Durham;
- Oswin (died 651), the murdered king of Deira, who had a following at Tynemouth;
- the abbesses Ebba (or Æbbe; died 683) of Coldingham and Æthelgitha, an otherwise-unknown abbess, possibly also from Coldingham or another Northumberland convent.

=== Hexham bishops: Acca, Alchmund and Eata ===
A variant version of the story of Alchmund of Hexham's translation is given by an anonymous author, probably from Hexham, in the Historia Regum. The vision of Bishop Alchmund is here given to a person referred to as "Dregmo", who summons Alfred to rebury the remains in Hexham church. Alfred complies, but secretly takes a fingerbone, which he plans to take to the shrine in Durham. On the following day the saint's bier proves immovable from the portico; Dregmo has a second vision exposing the theft, to which Alfred readily admits. After the restoration of the fingerbone, the ceremony proceeds unhindered. This version is repeated by Ailred of Rievaulx.

According to the Historia Regum as well as the accounts of Richard of Hexham and Ailred of Rievaulx, when Bishop Acca was reburied in Hexham, several relics were removed undamaged from his grave. These included some of his vestments (chasuble, dalmatic and maniple), his shroud and a silk tunic, as well as a wooden portable altar. The chasuble and portions of his "face-cloth" appear in a list of Durham Cathedral's relics compiled in 1383.

The 12th-century Life of St Eata suggests that a third Hexham bishop and saint, Eata (died 686), might also have been translated within the Hexham church by Alfred, although he is not mentioned in either Symeon's list of saints or Ailred's work. Eata also served as Abbot of Melrose Abbey and Bishop of Lindisfarne, and had taught both Cuthbert and Boisil.

=== Theft of Bede ===
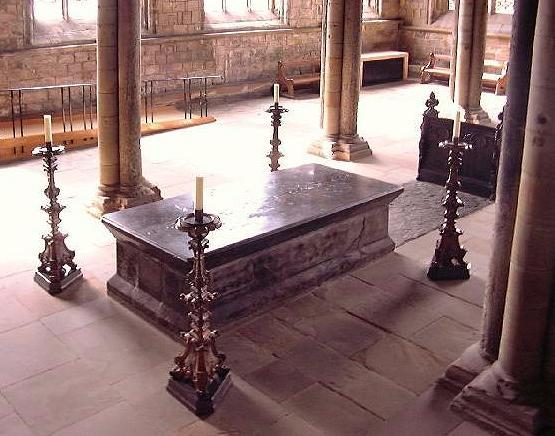
Bede's tomb at Durham Cathedral

Alfred is also traditionally reported to have stolen the bones of the scholar and saint Bede (died 735) from its shrine in Jarrow, and translated them to Durham in secret. Symeon's detailed account is uncharacteristically circumspect. No vision is mentioned. After establishing that Alfred was in the habit of commemorating Bede's death by visiting the Jarrow monastery, it states that one year he arrived back early, having left his companions behind, and never returned to Jarrow. He is then said to have acted as if he had "secured the object of his desires", saying when asked about the whereabouts of Bede's bones that they were in Cuthbert's shrine, but enjoining his listeners to keep the matter to themselves. When Cuthbert's coffin was opened a few days before its translation to the Norman cathedral, around half a century after Alfred's death, a little linen bag was discovered, subsequently claimed to contain Bede's bones. The story has some similarities with the 9th-century theft by Ariviscus of the French Sainte Foy's relics from Agen, Aquitaine.

The discovery of the bag is also described by an eye-witness to the opening of the coffin in the later "Miracle 18" account. The anonymous author states that Bede's bones were known to have been removed from his original burial place in Jarrow; he names Alfred only indirectly as the person who also translated Boisil's remains.

Kendall notes that examinations of Cuthbert's coffin in the 1050s are not recorded to have found a linen bag. He considers the tradition of Alfred's secret translation of Bede to be "probably apocryphal", inferring that it was invented to provide provenance for the unidentified bones in the linen bag. Some subsequent 20th- and 21st-century scholars have also cast doubts on the story's authenticity. Ward describes it as a "strange story", and draws attention to its close parallels with the medieval "pious theft" literary tradition, a genre that embraces wholly fictional accounts. She notes that the earliest written account of the removal of the bones dates from at least 100 years later, there is no external evidence for Alfred's action, and the attendant secrecy meant that the translation did not fulfil its purpose. She suggests another possibility: that monks from Jarrow translated the remains in 1083 when the Benedictine priory was founded in Durham.

== Medieval sources ==
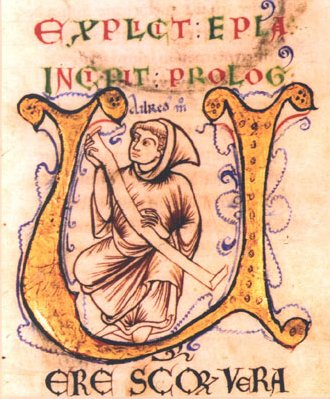
St Ailred of Rievaulx, Alfred's great-grandson, is one source for his life

Alfred's history is relatively well attested, being documented in manuscripts including:

- An Account of the Early Provosts of Hexham (c. 1100);
- the Libellus de exordio (1104–15) of Symeon of Durham;
- a section of the multiply authored Historia Regum (1113–64), possibly contributed by someone from Hexham;
- the anonymous "Miracle 18" narrative in Capitula de Miraculis et Translationibus Sancti Cuthberti (after 1128);
- the History of the Church of Hexham (1154–c.1160) by Prior Richard of Hexham;
- On the Saints of Hexham (1154–67) by Ailred of Rievaulx;
- The Life of St Eata (12th century), an anonymous compilation covering the Hexham saints;
- the Libellus de admirandis beati Cuthberti virtutibus quae novellis patratae sunt temporibus (c. 1150–75) of Reginald of Durham.

Although few if any of these writers could have been eye-witnesses to his acts, Symeon's narrative is in part based on the testimony of a monk named as Gamel, possibly one of Alfred's priestly deputies; Richard was acquainted with the second Eilaf, his grandson; and Reginald claims that at least some of his additions were sourced to Ailred and recounted traditions handed down within the family. Kendall considers that the early Hexham accounts are likely to be independent from Symeon's account, unlike Reginald's significantly later narrative.

== See also ==
- Durham, a poem extolling Durham's relic collection
- St Cuthbert's coffin

== Notes and references ==
=== Sources ===
- Aird, W. M. (1994), "St Cuthbert, the Scots and the Normans", in Marjorie Chibnall (ed.), Proceedings of the Battle Conference, Boydell & Brewer, pp. 1–20, ISBN 9780851153667
- Blurton, Heather (2008), "Reliquia: Writing Relics in Anglo-Norman Durham", in Jeffrey Jerome Cohen (ed.), Cultural Diversity in the British Middle Ages: Archipelago, Island, England, Springer, pp. 39–56, ISBN 9780230614123
- Bonney, Margaret (2005), "Urban origins: The growth and development of Durham to 1250", Lordship and the Urban Community: Durham and Its Overlords, 1250–1540, Cambridge University Press, pp. 9–36, ISBN 9780521022859
- Colgrave, Bertram (1985), Two Lives of St. Cuthbert, Cambridge University Press, ISBN 9780521313858
- Crook, John (2011), English Medieval Shrines, Boydell & Brewer, ISBN 9781843836827
- Farmer, David Hugh (2011), The Oxford Dictionary of Saints (5th edn), Oxford University Press, ISBN 9780199596607
- Geary, Patrick J. (2011), Furta Sacra: Thefts of Relics in the Central Middle Ages, Princeton University Press, ISBN 9781400820207
- Kendall, Calvin B. (1984), "Dry Bones in a Cathedral: The Story of the Theft of Bede's Relics and the Translation of Cuthbert into the Cathedral of Durham in 1104", Mediaevalia, 10: 1–26
- Kendall, Calvin B. (1988), "Let Us Now Praise a Famous City: Wordplay in the OE Durham and the Cult of St. Cuthbert", Journal of English and Germanic Philology, 87 (4): 507–21, JSTOR 27710064
- O'Donnell, Thomas (2014), "The Old English Durham, the Historia de sancto Cuthberto, and the Unreformed in Late Anglo-Saxon Literature", Journal of English and Germanic Philology, 113 (2): 131–55, doi:10.5406/jenglgermphil.113.2.0131, S2CID 154439127 – via Project MUSE
- Offler, H. S. (1962), "The Date of Durham (Carmen de Situ Dunelmi)", Journal of English and Germanic Philology, 61 (3): 591–94, JSTOR 27714086
- Story, Joanna; Bailey, Richard N. (2015), "The skull of Bede", Antiquaries Journal, 95: 325–50, doi:10.1017/S0003581515000244, hdl:2381/32092, S2CID 163360680
- Ward, Benedicta (1998), The Venerable Bede (2nd ed.), Geoffrey Chapman, ISBN 9780225668599
