= St Cuthbert's coffin =

Oak coffin in Durham Cathedral

Representation of the pectoral cross from the coffin, used as an emblem.

What is usually referred to as St Cuthbert's coffin is a fragmentary oak coffin in Durham Cathedral, pieced together in the 20th century, which between AD 698 and 1827 contained the remains of Saint Cuthbert, who died in 687. In fact when Cuthbert's remains were yet again reburied in 1827 in a new coffin, some 6,000 pieces of up to four previous layers of coffin were left in the burial, and then finally removed in 1899. This coffin is thought to be Cuthbert's first wooden coffin, and probably to date to 698, when his remains were moved from a stone sarcophagus in the abbey church at Lindisfarne to the main altar.

The coffin is almost the only surviving example of what was no doubt a very large body of Anglo-Saxon wood carving, being inscribed or engraved with linear images which have tituli in Latin lettering and Anglo-Saxon runes with names of apostles and saints. Many names are illegible.

== History ==
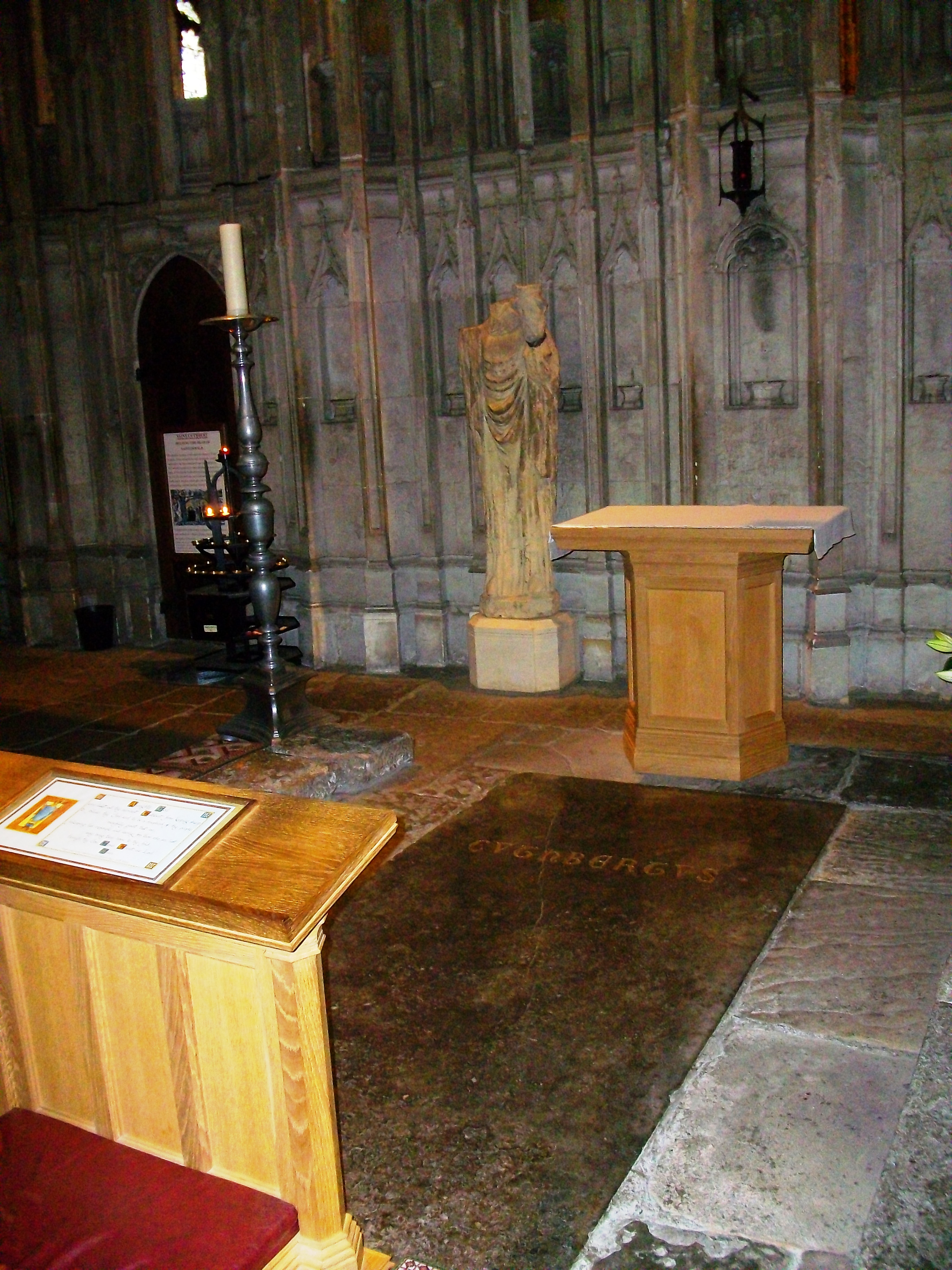
The most recent resting place of Cuthbert's remains, in Durham Cathedral

Cuthbert died on 20 March 687 in his hermit's cell on Inner Farne Island, two miles from Bamburgh, Northumberland, and was taken back to the main monastery at Lindisfarne to be buried. Eleven years later the coffin was re-opened, and according to his biographies (including prose and verse ones by Bede from about 720) his remains were found to be "incorrupt" or undecayed. This was a traditional attribute of sainthood and helped greatly in his subsequent cult. He was reburied in a new coffin, apparently over the original one, which is described in his biographies, and matches the surviving coffin closely; this is called a levis theca ("light chest" in Latin) in Bede's biography. This was placed above ground at the altar, and apparently covered with a linen cloth, an indication that Cuthbert was already regarded as a saint.

In 875 the monks evacuated the abbey with the coffin, in anticipation of the Great Heathen Army moving into the area. For seven years they carried it with them to various places in modern Scotland and Northumbria before settling it in the still existing St Cuthbert's church in Chester-le-Street until 995, when another Danish invasion led to its removal to Ripon. It was at Chester-le-Street that King Athelstan visited it, and the textiles were placed inside. Travelling once again, the cart with the coffin became stuck at Durham, which was taken as a sign that the saint wished to remain there. A new stone church—the so-called 'White Church'—was built, the predecessor of the present grand cathedral. The body was moved within the cathedral at various points; in 1104 when the Norman cathedral was constructed, and in 1541 when the medieval shrine which was one of the principal English pilgrimage sites was destroyed during the Reformation. The coffin was opened at various times during this period: a mid-11th century priest named Alfred Westou was in the habit of often combing the hair of the saint, and is also traditionally considered to have been responsible for placing the purloined bones of Bede in the coffin.

In 1827 the coffin was once again removed, having been found in a walled space at the site of the shrine. By then there were up to four layers of coffin in fragmentary condition, taken to date from 1541, 1041, 698 and 687, housing a complete skeleton, and other human remains, though many of the contents had been removed earlier. The textiles were removed in 1827. The human remains were reburied in a new coffin under a plain inscribed slab, with the remains of the old coffins, which were removed in yet another opening of the burial in 1899. These totalled some 6,000, of which 169 showed signs of having been carved or engraved. The art-historian Ernst Kitzinger, then with the British Museum, made a reconstruction of the carved oak sections in 1939, which has subsequently been slightly re-arranged. The reconstructed coffin and most of the contents are now on view in the Cathedral Museum; the St Cuthbert Gospel has been often on display in London since the 1970s.

The fragments of St Cuthbert's coffin have been exhibited at Durham Cathedral since 2017.

== Engraving and contents ==
From the several thousand fragments collected in 1899 the art historian Ernst Kitzinger pieced together in 1939 a selection of 169 to make the fragmentary montages of the 7th century coffin now exhibited in the museum in Durham Cathedral, with engraved figures of Christ surrounded by four Evangelists' symbols on the lid, on one end the earliest surviving iconic representation of the Virgin and Child outside Rome from the medieval art of the Western Church, with the archangels Michael and Gabriel on the other. The sides show the Twelve Apostles and five archangels.

The coffin also contained the Stonyhurst or Saint Cuthbert Gospel (now British Library) and the best surviving examples of Anglo-Saxon embroidery or opus Anglicanum, a stole and maniple which were probably added in the 930s, and given by King Athelstan. Other probable possessions of Cuthbert found inside are an ivory comb, a portable altar, and a pectoral cross with gold and garnet cloisonné, a rare and important early example of Christian Anglo-Saxon jewellery.

== Inscriptions ==
The runic inscription reads:

ihs xps mat(t)[h](eus)

The ma and possibly the eu are bind runes. The t is inverted. Then follows:

marcus

The ma is again a bind rune, then:

LVCAS

In Latin letters, followed by runic:

iohann(i)s

Followed by Latin:

(RAPH)AEL (M)A(RIA)

The names of Matthew, Mark and John are thus in runes, while that of Luke is in Latin letters. The Christogram is notably in runic writing, ihs xps ᛁᚻᛋ ᛉᛈᛋ, with the h double-barred in the continental style, the first attestation of that variant in England. The monogram reflects a runic variant of a partly Latinized XPS from Greek ΧΡΙϹΤΟϹ, with the rho rendered as runic p and the eolc rune (the old Algiz rune z) used to render chi. It is difficult to account for the mixture of scripts, or find significance in which parts are in which script, but it can be said that such mixtures are not uncommon among inscriptions of the period from northern England, including the Franks Casket and stones from Lindisfarne and Monkwearmouth.
