= Boisil =

Monk of Melrose Abbey

Saint Boisil
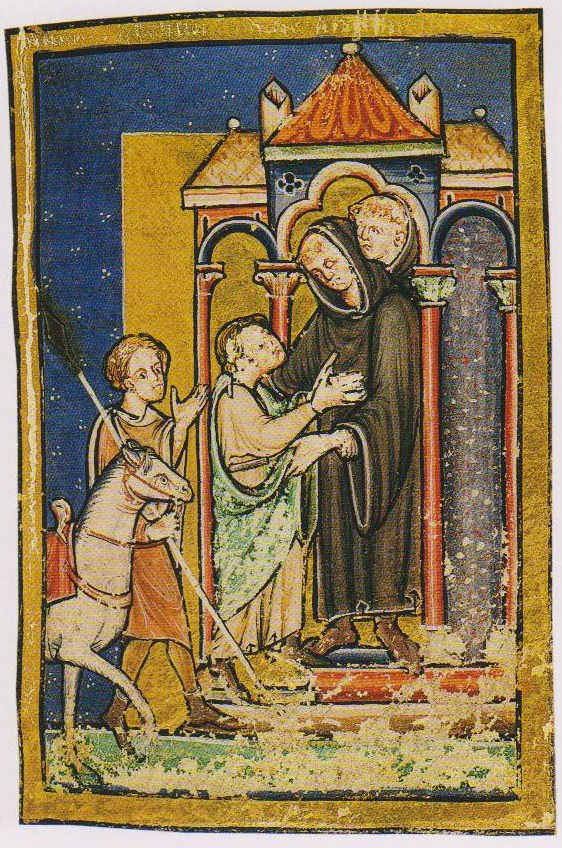
- Boisil welcomes Cuthbert to Melrose; 12th-century miniature form British Library Yates Thomson MS 26 version of Bede's prose Life of St Cuthbert

Abbot
- Born: unknown Northumbria, England
- Died: 7 July 664; Melrose, Scotland
- Venerated in: Eastern Orthodox Church; Roman Catholic Church; Anglican Communion
- Major shrine: Melrose Abbey, Scotland (destroyed)
- Feast: 7 July (24 February for Orthodox)
- Attributes: Abbot

Boisil (died 661) was a monk of Melrose Abbey, an offshoot of Lindisfarne, then in the Anglo-Saxon Kingdom of Northumbria, but now in Scotland, where he must have been one of the first generation of monks. He probably moved to the new foundation of Melrose when it was started, some time in the late 640s.

== Life ==
Almost all that is known of Boisil is learned from Bede. He derived his information from Sigfrid, a monk of Jarrow, who had previously been trained by Boisil at Melrose. Boisil was the teacher of Cuthbert.

Boisil was prior of this house under the abbot Eata, both of whom seem to have been trained in monastic discipline by Aidan. It was Boisil's evident sanctity, which drew the young Cuthbert to Melrose Abbey, rather than the more famous Lindisfarne, in AD 651. By chance, the prior was standing by the abbey gate when Cuthbert arrived. The latter entered the church to pray and, Bede documents that "Boisil had an intuition of the high degree of holiness to which the boy would rise", and said just this single phrase to the monks with whom he was standing: "Behold the servant of the Lord". Abbot Eata soon gave permission for Cuthbert to enter the community, Boisil succeeded Eata as abbot in 659.

It was from Boisil that Cuthbert learned the scriptures, pupil and teacher becoming friends. Both travelled among the villages neighbouring Melrose and preached to the local people. The sick and ailing were brought to Boisil from far and near seeking to be cured by his herbal remedies, and by the healing properties of the two local springs containing iron salts.

Contemporaries were deeply impressed with Boisil's supernatural intuitions. Three years beforehand, he foretold the great pestilence of 664, and that he himself should die of it, but that Eata, the abbot, should outlive it. When in the great pestilence Cuthbert was stricken down, Boisil declared he would certainly recover. Somewhat later Boisil himself as he had foretold three years before, fell a victim to this terrible epidemic, but before the end came he predicted that Cuthbert would become a bishop and would effect great things for the Church.

After his death, Boisil appeared twice in a vision to a monk he had known, concerning the future Bishop Ecgberht of Ripon, who was instructed to concentrate on existing monasteries rather than missionary activity on the Continent. He is believed, on somewhat dubious authority, to have written certain theological works, but they have not been preserved. St Boswells in Roxburghshire commemorates his name. His relics, like those of Bede, were carried off to Durham in the 11th century by the priest, Alfred Westow. In the early calendars, his day is assigned to 23 February. The Bollandists treat of him on 9 September but his feast is generally accepted as 7 July, with a translation on 8 June.
