= Robert Kaske =

American medieval literature professor (1921–1989)

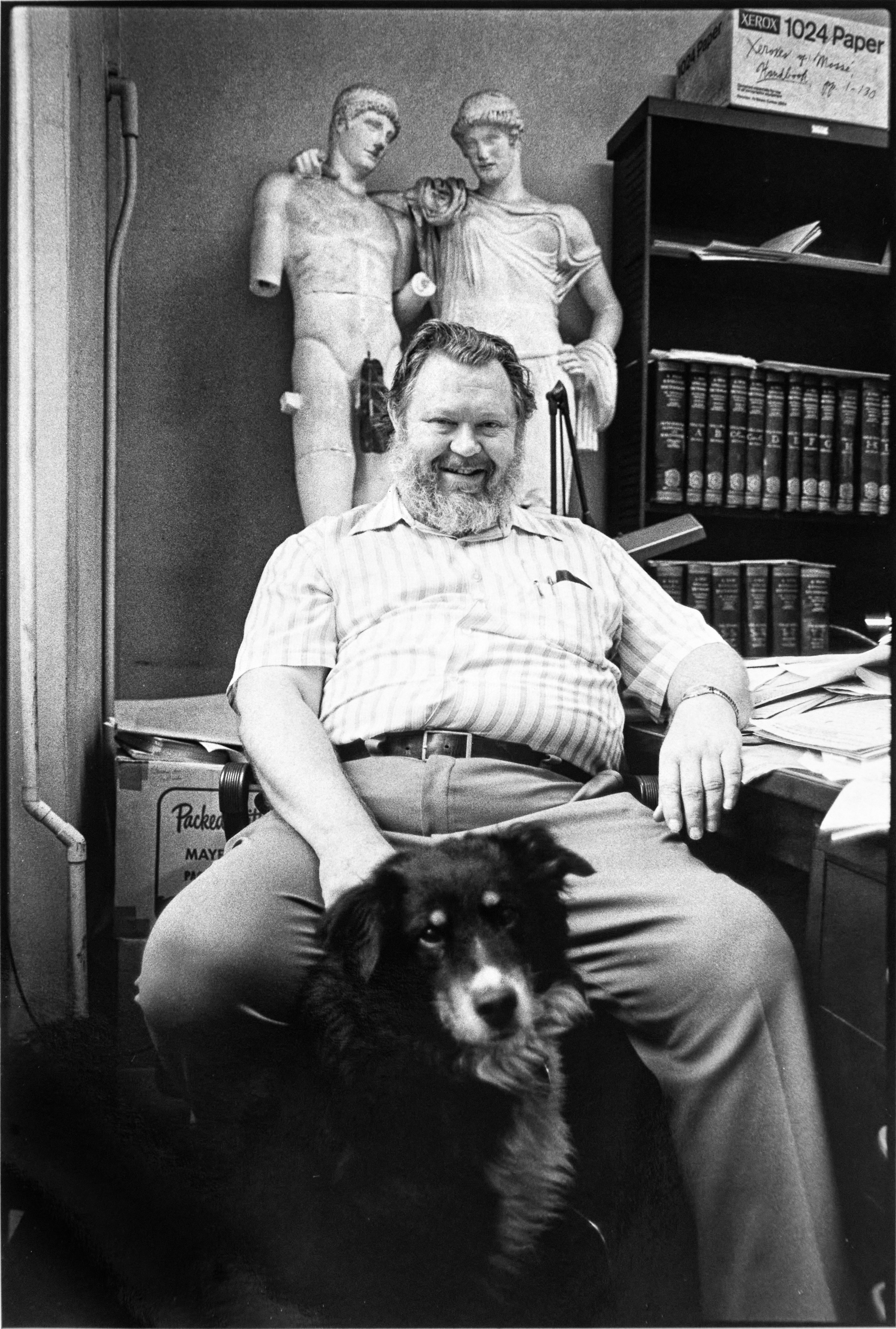
- Kaske, c. 1974 (Note: The photograph was taken by George Simian, a Cornell alumnus then working at the university as an instructor in photography. On the bookshelf is the Oxford English Dictionary; behind Kaske is a copy of Orestes and Electra, of which Cornell held a cast. Upon seeing the photograph, Kaske remarked "Well, it ain't flattering, but good photography, I guess. ... And it is a beautiful portrait of Rex.")
- Born: Robert Earl Kaske; June 1, 1921; Cincinnati, Ohio, U.S.
- Died: August 8, 1989 (aged 68); Ithaca, New York, U.S.
- Years active: 1950–1989
- Title: Avalon Foundation Professor in the Humanities
- Spouses: Mildred Reinerman (m. 1944, divorced); Carol Vonckx (m. 1958)
- Children: 2

Academic background
- Education: Xavier University (BA); University of North Carolina at Chapel Hill (MA, PhD)
- Thesis: The nature and use of figurative expression in Piers Plowman, text B (1950)

Academic work
- Discipline: Medieval literature
- Institutions: Washington University in St. Louis(1950 to 1957); Cornell University (from 1964)
- Notable works: Medieval Christian Literary Imagery: A Guide to Interpretation (1988)
- Military career
- Branch: United States Army
- Service years: 1942–1946
- Rank: First lieutenant
- Unit: 819th Tank Destroyer Battalion
- Conflicts: World War II

Robert Earl Kaske (June 1, 1921 – August 8, 1989) was an American professor of medieval literature. He spent most of his career at Cornell University in Ithaca, New York, where he was the Avalon Foundation Professor in the Humanities, and where he founded one of the preeminent medieval studies graduate programs in North America. His published output included lengthy interpretations of Beowulf, and of poems and passages by Dante and Chaucer, and frequently constituted leading studies. Kaske particularly enjoyed solving cruxes, with articles on problematic passages in works such as Pearl, Piers Plowman, the Divine Comedy, "The Husband's Message", "The Descent into Hell", and Beowulf.

Born in Cincinnati, Kaske studied liberal arts at Xavier University and joined a variety of student literary organizations there. He was a four-year member of the Reserve Officers' Training Corps, and was commissioned a second lieutenant before his 1942 graduation; much of the next four years was spent with the Army in the South Pacific during World War II. While there he read a story about a dusk-to-dawn conversation between two professors and, entranced by the prospect of such intellectual discussions, decided on an academic career. Kaske enrolled in the English literature program at the University of North Carolina at Chapel Hill (UNC) on the back of the G.I. Bill, received his master's in 1947, and his PhD in 1950.

From 1950 to 1963 Kaske held posts at Washington University in St. Louis, Pennsylvania State University, UNC, and the University of Illinois Urbana-Champaign, rising from lecturer to full professor along the way; he termed his departure from UNC as the time he "published himself out of paradise". A visiting professorship at Cornell in 1963 became permanent in 1964, and Kaske remained at the university for the rest of his life.

A popular and "Falstaffian" professor, Kaske, along with the medieval studies program he founded, was credited by colleagues with producing the backbone of the discipline's next scholastic generation. His editorial imprint was visible in the works of many, including former students and those who submitted papers to the journal Traditio, which he edited. Over the course of his career he collected what one former student termed "most of the awards and honors possible for a medieval scholar", including fellowships from the National Endowment for the Humanities and the American Council of Learned Societies, and two Guggenheim Fellowships.

== Early life and education ==
Robert Kaske, who went by Bob, was born on June 1, 1921 in Cincinnati, Ohio. His parents were Herman C. Kaske, a postal clerk with the United States Postal Service, and Ann Rose Kaske (née Laake). Robert Kaske attended St. Martin's, a Catholic elementary school, and later the boys prep school Elder High School, where he received straight As across four years of English, Latin, and religion, and missed only a single day of school. While there he worked on the school newspaper and the yearbook, won the school's Latin contest, and played baseball; he graduated from the modern English course in 1938. In a yearbook filled with humorous projected jobs for the graduates, such as "dog-catcher" and "pretzel-twister", Kaske was an exception: "Robert Kaske, Editor."

After graduating from high school, Kaske matriculated at Xavier University, where he studied the liberal arts. Kaske was a four-year member of the Heidelberg Club, which described itself as intended "to further interest in the language, culture, history and transitions of the Germanic peoples". In his sophomore year Kaske began a three-year stint with the Xavier University News, writing the column "Quid Ergo?" Taken from Seneca, the Latin name of the column meant "So what?" Kaske described his topics as "touching on literature, politics, philosophy, economics, history, school affairs, slapstick, slapstick and slapstick", and involving "a schoolboy telling the world what is wrong with it".

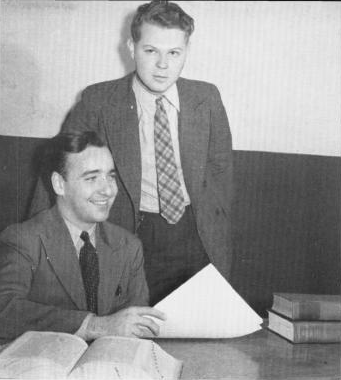
Kaske, standing, discussing his paper which won a prize

Also as a sophomore, Kaske joined The Athenaeum and the Mermaid Tavern, an undergraduate literary paper and literary club, respectively. He became editor in chief of the former his senior year, (Note: Kaske wrote for this paper even after his graduation, including a winter 1946–47 submission.) and "Host" of the latter. Kaske still spoke fondly of the Mermaid Tavern, where students presented their literary works and discussed those of the masters, in his later years. As a junior, a year in which he was inducted into the Jesuit academic honorary fraternity Alpha Sigma Nu, he joined the Masque Society, a theatrical group; he played Peter Dolan in a school production of Father Malachy's Miracle that year, and as a senior appeared in another play, Whispering in the Dark. Between his junior and senior years, Kaske spent much of the summer writing radio scripts. Also as a senior Kaske cofounded the Philosophy Club, a society for students interested in philosophical research, and joined The Traditionists, a literary club which that year devoted their meetings to reading Dante's Inferno. (Note: Kaske was one of nine finalists for membership in the Dante Lecture Club as a sophomore, but was not one of the three selected.) He placed sixth or seventh in an intercollegiate writing contest the same year. Kaske graduated magna cum laude with a Bachelor of Arts on June 3, 1942.

=== World War II ===
Kaske had joined the Reserve Officers' Training Corps in his first semester at Xavier, (Note: As a junior, Kaske wrote satirically that "What democracy is I don't exactly remember. I often think it must be a sort of idol to which every twenty years we sacrifice our finest young men". Of wearing the ROTC uniform in public, Kaske commented, "[a]dmiration, amusement, scorn, dismay, and even downright fear we have seen registered; but the payoff, we have always felt, is the bizarre assortment of questions which pop out at the uniformed victim from every side." Such questions, he wrote, ranged from "What are you?" ("Possible answers: (a) 'I'm Yehudi.' (b) 'I'm an American; what are you?' (c) 'Eagle member, Scout Troop 11 1/2.' (d) 'Ich bin ein Shtorm Trooper! Sieg Heil!' (e) Dignified silence.") to "What are all those decorations for?" (possible answers: "(a) 'I was the only one who knew which end of the cannon the shell comes out.' (b) 'They're to cover up the bullet-holes.' (c) Dignified silence.").) and even before his graduation was ordered to active service. He was commissioned a second lieutenant in the Army's field artillery on May 25, 1942, and ordered to report to Fort Thomas for a physical examination and assignment, with a furlough to account for his June commencement. Speaking to Kaske and 24 others, the commencement speaker, Archbishop John T. McNicholas, stated "[m]ay I assure the Second Lieutenants of this graduating class that the Archdiocese of Cincinnati is proud of them. It is happy to know that Xavier University is not only teaching theoretical patriotism, but that it is actually serving our country in the greatest crisis in its history."

Kaske served as a platoon leader and company commander with the 819th Tank Destroyer Battalion, taking him to ports in the United States, Hawaii (including Black Sand Beach), the Palau Islands (Peleliu and Angaur), and the Mariana Islands (Guam and Saipan). During a leave at the end of 1943, while stationed at Fort Hood, he served as a best man at a wedding in Cleburne, Texas, took out his own marriage license a week later, and married in January. His wife was Mildred Mae Reinerman, a 21-year-old bookkeeper. But the leave was short and in March 1944 Kaske's battalion departed California aboard the USS General G. O. Squier, headed for Hawaii. By 1945, Kaske was in Peleliu, where the 819th searched for remaining Japanese soldiers, defended the airstrip, and shelled Japanese-held islands. Kaske was discharged from the Army on June 1, 1946, having risen to the rank of first lieutenant.

=== Graduate studies ===
As a student at Xavier, Kaske had anticipated a business career, possibly in advertising. That changed while filling time at the end of the war on a coral island in the Pacific, when he read a story about two professors engrossed in conversation from dusk to dawn; as the sun rose, one professor regretfully said he needed to prepare for class, and the other replied that he had been so absorbed he forgot he was not in his own house. Entranced by the prospect of such engaging intellectual conversations and aided by the tuition benefits afforded veterans by the G.I. Bill, Kaske set out for an academic life.

After talking it over with Father Paul Sweeney, a professor of English at Xavier and founder and patron of the Mermaid Tavern, Kaske entered the English literature program at the University of North Carolina at Chapel Hill (UNC) in 1946. As at Xavier, Kaske wrote for a student paper, Factotum, including poems, and at least one short story: "Sergeant Hinchey's Homecoming", about a veteran regaling an unsuspecting church group with ribald tales from service in Hawaii, Angaur, Texas, and Kwajalein. (Note: Eight years earlier, Kaske had written about the "extremely challenging problem" that "the draft will lower moral standards in the United States", by taking conscripts "from their jobs, their home, and their families while still in their formative years". Some measures, Kaske wrote, "must be taken to safeguard our youth. After all, do we not give our time, energy, and money to drives against indecent literature and picture-shows, for the same purpose?") Under the direction of Hardin Craig, Kaske wrote his Master's thesis on George Chapman's tragedies, receiving his degree in 1947. If not for Craig's departure to the University of Missouri, wrote the medieval scholar (and former Kaske student) Emerson Brown Jr., Kaske might have become a Renaissance scholar. Instead, under George Coffman's direction, he wrote his Ph.D. dissertation on the Late Medieval poem Piers Plowman and graduated in 1950.

== Career ==
Kaske was hired as an English instructor at Washington University in St. Louis by April 1950, before his June dissertation defense. He began teaching a variety of courses in medieval language and literature, including studies of Dante. At Washington, Kaske found the intellectual engagement he had been looking for, including with colleagues Vladimir Jelinek and Ernst Abrahamson. He also began to publish, with articles on Piers Plowman in each of 1951, 1952, and 1957. In 1952 he was promoted to assistant professor, and in 1955 he was awarded a $600 (equivalent to $7,200 in 2025) research grant for study during the summer.

Kaske left Washington University in 1957, then taught at Pennsylvania State University from 1957 to 1958. He left Pennsylvania to return to his alma mater UNC, where he began his associate professorship on September 1, 1958. An article on the epic poem Beowulf was published in the university's journal Studies in Philology shortly before his arrival, followed in 1959 by another article on Piers Plowman. A year later, Kaske was awarded a grant by the American Council of Learned Societies to work on a book, provisionally titled The Heroic Ideal in Old English Poetry. In 1961 Kaske was awarded a Guggenheim Fellowship to study heroism and the hero in Old English poetry, and served as secretary of the Modern Language Association's Middle English group. Kaske enjoyed packed classes and the esteem of his colleagues at UNC, but soon began receiving attractive offers from other institutions. After three years Kaske left for the University of Illinois at Urbana–Champaign, where he was hired as a tenured full professor on September 1, 1961, with a starting annual salary of $13,000 (equivalent to $140,000 in 2025); he would henceforth term this move the time he "published himself out of paradise". (Note: Kaske's salary rose to $13,700 (equivalent to $146,000 in 2025) the following year. He would return to UNC later on in his career, including when he lectured on "The Marriage Group" in Chaucer on March 7, 1969, and gave a medieval poetry reading three days later, and another visit in summer 1979.)

=== Cornell ===
In the fall semester of 1963, Kaske, who later admitted he was "looking around" and anxious to leave Illinois, took a six-month visiting professorship at Cornell University in Ithaca, New York. The following year, Cornell made an offer for a permanent position, which Kaske accepted; he remained there for the rest of his life. In 1968, a year in which he was first listed in Who's Who in America, Kaske was awarded another grant by the American Council of Learned Societies, this time to travel to England and search for the sources of imagery in poems by the unknown Gawain Poet. Another grant by the organization followed in 1971, for further research into the heroic ideal in Old English poetry, and that year Kaske participated in a symposium on Geoffrey Chaucer held at the University of Georgia. During 1972–73 he was a Faculty Fellow of the university's Society for the Humanities, and in 1974 he was named the Avalon Foundation Professor in the Humanities, succeeding Herbert Dieckmann. In 1975, he was appointed chief editor of the journal Traditio, and in 1977, he again won a Guggenheim Fellowship, this time to undertake research on the sources and methodology for the interpretation of medieval imagery. In 1984–85, the National Endowment for the Humanities awarded Kaske a Fellowship for Independent Study and Research; he intended to use it to complete a manual for scholars of medieval literature. As part of the fellowship Kaske directed a seminar on "Latin Christian Tradition in Medieval Literature", which presented the material from the book Kaske was working on.

At Cornell, Kaske founded a medieval studies graduate program, which Old English scholar Fred C. Robinson said came to become "one of the great seminaries of medieval scholars in North America during the latter part of the twentieth century". The program required all medieval literature students to take courses and intensive examinations in at least four medieval languages and literatures, and to have or learn French, German, and classical and medieval Latin, in addition to two semesters of Latin palaeography; some "survivors" termed it the "Parris Island of medieval studies". (Note: Another reason for this term may have been that Kaske frequently shared stories from his military days.) Just Kaske's introduction to medieval studies, a semester-long seminar, drew students from Yale and other universities, while the overall program, his colleagues said, "produced a group of scholars who have become the backbone of the next generation in medieval studies, and who, in their collective achievement and their dedication to the pedagogical and scholarly ideals of their mentor, constitute Bob's true monument".

Kaske was known for his loyalty to his students, and his love of learning and teaching. He was described as a "Falstaffian figure", and popular with students. "If we were students all of the time," Brown wrote, "Robert Kaske was a teacher all of the time." Students would frequently drop by Kaske's house unannounced to seek his input, bibliographic references, or access to his rich library, which Kaske amassed over the years despite his modest background and academic salary. (Note: On one visit to New Hampshire, for instance, Kaske came across a copy of Malvenda's sixteenth-century treatise De Antichristo in a second-hand book store specializing in Civil War memorabilia and detective novels. Kaske purchased the volume and gave it to a friend.) Even once graduated, Kaske would continue to edit students' drafts; meanwhile, he "even turned the letter of recommendation into an art form".

Around 1960, Kaske joined a panel discussion in which he defended patristic learning—the study of early Christian writers—as a way of interpreting vernacular literature. The discussion was published, and republished, in essay form, and gained Kaske a reputation as a fierce proponent of using medieval intellectual contexts to understand the literature, as opposed to the "New Criticism" school of thought that argued that medieval poetry should be read in a contextual vacuum. This reputation overlooked the balance Kaske struck between focusing on careful reading of the literature, and bringing in exegetical information where prudent. Kaske nonetheless firmly believed that such contextual learning remained one of the most promising ways to make new discoveries about the meaning conveyed by literary works. Listening to Kaske lecture for two hours on "How to Use Biblical Exegesis for the Interpretation of Medieval Literature" at the Dartmouth Dante Institute in 1985, Madison U. Sowell wrote that "I learned more in one exhilarating afternoon about the 'nuts and bolts' of using biblical commentaries to interpret medieval literature than I had in three-and-a-half years at my Ivy League graduate school." He was a "master" at combining "insight and scholarly rigor", wrote Brown, joining "imagination in literary interpretation with the painstaking historical research required to gather supporting evidence". On top of this, a colleague added, Kaske possessed "a kind of native intuition about what a medieval poet might want to say".

== Awards and distinctions ==
Kaske, Brown wrote, "received most of the awards and honors possible for a medieval scholar". These included two Guggenheim Fellowships, a grant and a fellowship from the National Endowment for the Humanities, a grant from the American Philosophical Society, a Senior Fellowship at the Southeastern Institute of Medieval and Renaissance Studies, a fellowship at Cornell's Society for the Humanities, and grants-in-aid and a fellowship from the American Council of Learned Societies. He served on the editorial and advisory boards of Speculum, The Chaucer Review, A Manual of the Writings in Middle English, and Traditio. In 1975, Kaske was appointed chief editor of the latter journal, and elected Councillor in the Medieval Academy of America; seven years later, he was elected a Fellow of the Academy. In 1986, a Festschrift was published in Kaske's honor. The work was titled Magister Regis: Studies in Honor of Robert Earl Kaske, playing off of the name of Kaske's Border Collie, Rex.

== Personal life ==
Kaske and his first wife had a son, David Louis. But "the war left him little time for domesticity", Brown later wrote, and the marriage was over by 1958. That year Kaske married again, this time to Carol Vonckx, an English scholar who herself became a professor at Cornell. On January 10, 1966 they had a son, Richard James; at the time of his death, Kaske also had three grandchildren. He died of a brain tumor on August 8, 1989, at his Ithaca home on North Quarry Street. A funeral was held on August 26, at Ithaca's Immaculate Conception Church, and a memorial service on 21 October at Sage Chapel, with contributions suggested to the university library's Dante-Petrarch or Icelandic collections.

== Publications ==
Kaske published more than 60 works throughout his career, including articles, chapters, reviews, and a book; most of these were listed in his 1986 Festschrift. Even among his shorter works, his output frequently constituted seminal studies. Kaske particularly enjoyed solving cruxes, producing what Robinson termed "some of the most dazzling literary explications of this century". These included articles on problematic passages in works such as Pearl, Piers Plowman, Dante's Divine Comedy, Chaucer's "The Summoner's Tale", "The Husband's Message", "The Descent into Hell", Troilus and Criseyde, Le Jeu d'Adam, and Beowulf, and on the correct reading of engravings on spoons found in the seventh-century Sutton Hoo ship-burial. He also penned lengthy interpretations of Beowulf, and of poems and passages by Dante and Chaucer. Kaske's imprint was also evident in the works of others, including former students whose papers he marked up and returned, and those who submitted works to Traditio. "If we were working in the sciences," Brown wrote, "where team research is routine, Bob Kaske's bibliography would be many times its present length."

In 1988 Kaske published Medieval Christian Literary Imagery: A Guide to Interpretation, which colleagues referred to as a "magisterial work" that served as "the crowning achievement of his scholarly career". The work focused on Kaske's craft—using the available tools and sources to do the kind of scholarly explication that he himself did—and Kaske saw it as an extension of his teaching career.

=== Books ===
- Kaske, Robert E. (1947). An analysis of Chapman's tragedies, based on a consideration of tragic theory and the fundamental types of tragedy (M.A.). Chapel Hill: University of North Carolina at Chapel Hill. OCLC 37757454.
- Kaske, Robert E. (1950). The nature and use of figurative expression in Piers Plowman, text B (Ph.D.). Chapel Hill: University of North Carolina at Chapel Hill. OCLC 37757491.
- Kaske, Robert E.; Groos, Arthur & Twomey, Michael W. (1988). Leyerle, John (ed.). Medieval Christian Literary Imagery: A Guide to Interpretation. Toronto Medieval Bibliographies. Vol. 11. Toronto: University of Toronto Press. ISBN 0-8020-2636-2. JSTOR 10.3138/j.ctt2tv0pq.

=== Articles ===
- Kaske, Robert E. (July 1951). "The Use of Simple Figures of Speech in Piers Plowman B: A Study in the Figurative Expression of Ideas and Opinions". Studies in Philology. XLVIII (3). Chapel Hill: The University of North Carolina Press: 571–600. JSTOR 4172984.
- Kaske, Robert E. (October 1952). "A Note on bras in Piers Plowman, A, III, 189; B, III, 195". Philological Quarterly. XXXI (4). Iowa City: State University of Iowa: 427–430.
- Kaske, Robert E. (April 1957). "Gigas the Giant in Piers Plowman". The Journal of English and Germanic Philology. LVI (2). Urbana: The University of Illinois: 177–185. JSTOR 27706901.
- Kaske, Robert E. (November 1957). "Langland and the Paradisus Claustralis". Modern Language Notes. LXXII (7). Baltimore, Maryland: The Johns Hopkins Press: 481–483. doi:10.2307/3043508. JSTOR 3043508.
- Kaske, Robert E. (December 1957). "The Knight's Interruption of the Monk's Tale". ELH. 24 (4). Baltimore, Maryland: The Johns Hopkins Press: 249–268. doi:10.2307/2871956. JSTOR 2871956.
- Kaske, Robert E. (July 1958). "Sapientia et Fortitudo as the Controlling Theme of Beowulf". Studies in Philology. LV (3). Chapel Hill: The University of North Carolina Press: 423–456. JSTOR 4173241.

- Edited and republished in Kaske, Robert E. (1963). "Sapientia et Fortitudo as the Controlling Theme of Beowulf". In Nicholson, Lewis E. (ed.). An Anthology of Beowulf Criticism. Notre Dame, Indiana: University of Notre Dame Press. pp. 269–310. ISBN 978-0268000066. SBN 268-00006-9.

- Kaske, Robert E. (1959a). "The Speech of "Book" in Piers Plowman". Anglia. 1959 (77). Tübingen, Baden-Württemberg: Max Niemeyer Verlag: 117–144. doi:10.1515/angl.1959.1959.77.117. S2CID 162098491.
- Kaske, Robert E. (1959b). "Two Cruxes in 'Pearl': 596 and 609–10". Traditio. XV. New York: Fordham University Press: 418–428. doi:10.1017/S0362152900008333. JSTOR 27830395. S2CID 151356558.
- Kaske, Robert E. (June 1959c). "The Summoner's Garleek, Oynons, and Eek Lekes". Modern Language Notes. LXXIV (6). Baltimore, Maryland: The Johns Hopkins Press: 481–484. doi:10.2307/3040589. JSTOR 3040589.
- Kaske, Robert E. (September 1959d). "An Aube in the Reeve's Tale". ELH. 26 (3). Baltimore, Maryland: The Johns Hopkins Press: 295–310. doi:10.2307/2871790. JSTOR 2871790.
- Kaske, Robert E. (October 1959e). "Langland's Walnut-Simile". The Journal of English and Germanic Philology. LVIII (4). Urbana: The University of Illinois: 650–654. JSTOR 27707361.
- Kaske, Robert E. (December 1959f). "The Sigemund-Heremod and Hama-Hygelac Passages in Beowulf". Publications of the Modern Language Association. LXXIV (5). Modern Language Association: 489–494. doi:10.2307/460497. JSTOR 460497. S2CID 163807561.
- Kaske, Robert E. (January 1960a). "January's "Aube"". Modern Language Notes. LXXV (1). Baltimore, Maryland: The Johns Hopkins Press: 1–4. doi:10.2307/3040559. JSTOR 3040559.
- Kaske, Robert E. (June 1960b). "Weohstan's Sword". Modern Language Notes. LXXV (6). Baltimore, Maryland: The Johns Hopkins Press: 465–468. doi:10.2307/3040330. JSTOR 3040330.
- Kaske, Robert E. (1960c). "Eve's 'Leaps' in the Ancrene Riwle". Medium Ævum. XXIX (1). The Society for the Study of Mediæval Languages and Literature: 22–24. doi:10.2307/43626839. JSTOR 43626839.
- Kaske, Robert E. (1961a). "Dante's 'DXV' and 'Veltro'". Traditio. XVII. New York: Fordham University Press: 185–254. doi:10.1017/S0362152900008503. JSTOR 27830427. S2CID 152246344.

- Abridged and added to in Kaske, Robert E. (1965). "Dante's DXV". In Freccero, John (ed.). Dante: A Collection of Critical Essays. Twentieth Century Views. Vol. 46. Englewood Cliffs, New Jersey: Prentice-Hall. pp. 122–140. LCCN 65-13596.

- Kaske, Robert E. (July 1962). "The Canticum Canticorum in the Miller's Tale". Studies in Philology. LIX (3). Chapel Hill: The University of North Carolina Press: 479–500. JSTOR 4173387.
- Kaske, Robert E. (1963a). "Weland and the wurmas in Deor". English Studies. 44: 190–191. doi:10.1080/00138386308597170.
- Kaske, Robert E. (January 1963b). ""Ex VI Transicionis" and its Passage in Piers Plowman". The Journal of English and Germanic Philology. LXII (1). Urbana: The University of Illinois: 32–60. JSTOR 27714179.

- Revised and republished in Kaske, Robert E. (1969). ""Ex VI Transicionis" and its Passage in Piers Plowman". In Blanch, Robert J. (ed.). Style and Symbolism in Piers Plowman: A Modern Critical Anthology. Knoxville: The University of Tennessee Press. pp. 228–263. ISBN 978-0870490934. LCCN 69-20115.

- Kaske, Robert E. (1964). "The Reading Genyre in The Husband's Message Line 49". Medium Ævum. XXXIII (3). The Society for the Study of Mediæval Languages and Literature: 204–206. doi:10.2307/43627117. JSTOR 43627117.
- Kaske, Robert E. (1967a). "A Poem of the Cross in the Exeter Book: 'Riddle 60' and 'The Husband's Message'". Traditio. XXIII. New York: Fordham University Press: 41–71. doi:10.1017/S0362152900008734. JSTOR 27830826. S2CID 151602493.
- Kaske, Robert E. (October 1967b). "The Silver Spoons of Sutton Hoo". Speculum. XLII (4). Cambridge, Massachusetts: The Mediaeval Academy of America: 670–672. doi:10.2307/2851097. JSTOR 2851097. S2CID 162531857.
- Kaske, Robert E. (1968a). "Piers Plowman and Local Iconography". Journal of the Warburg and Courtauld Institutes. 31. London: The Warburg Institute: 159–169. doi:10.2307/750639. JSTOR 750639. S2CID 195050251.
- Kaske, Robert E. (1968b). "Some Newly Discovered Wall-Paintings at Madley, Herefordshire". Traditio. XXIV. New York: Fordham University Press: 464–471. doi:10.1017/S0362152900004839. JSTOR 27830859. S2CID 151312417.
- Kaske, Robert E. (1971). ""Sì si conserva il seme d'ogne giusto": (Purg. XXXII, 48)". Dante Studies. LXXXIX. Cambridge, Massachusetts: The Dante Society of America: 49–54. JSTOR 40166090.
- Kaske, Robert E. (July 1971). "Beowulf and the Book of Enoch". Speculum. XLVI (3). Cambridge, Massachusetts: The Mediaeval Academy of America: 421–431. doi:10.2307/2851906. JSTOR 2851906. S2CID 162719503.
- Kaske, Robert E. (1972). "Horn and Ivory in the Summoner's Tale". Neuphilologische Mitteilungen. LXXIII (3). Finland: The Modern Language Society of Helsinki: 122–126. JSTOR 43345340.
- Kaske, Robert E. (Spring 1974). "Dante's Purgatorio XXXII and XXXIII: A Survey of Christian History". University of Toronto Quarterly. XLIII (3). University of Toronto: 193–214. doi:10.3138/utq.43.3.193. S2CID 153970178.
- Kaske, Robert E. (1975). "A Dagger in Relief on Stonehenge?". Traditio. XXXI. New York: Fordham University Press: 315–316. doi:10.1017/S0362152900011363. JSTOR 27830990. S2CID 151462929.
- Kaske, Robert E. (March 1984). "The Coastwarden's Maxim in Beowulf: A Clarification". Notes and Queries. New Series. 31 (1). Oxford: Oxford University Press: 16–18. doi:10.1093/nq/31-1-16. ISSN 0029-3970.
- Kaske, Robert E. (1985). "The Gifstol Crux in Beowulf". Leeds Studies in English. New Series. XVI. Leeds, West Yorkshire: The University of Leeds School of English: 142–151. ISSN 0075-8566.
- Kaske, Robert E.; Springer, Otto & Andersson, Theodore M. (July 1985). "Memoirs of Fellows and Corresponding Fellows of the Medieval Academy of America: Einar Ólafur Sveinsson". Speculum. 60 (3). Cambridge, Massachusetts: The Mediaeval Academy of America: 776–777. JSTOR 2848227.
- Howard, Donald R.; Kaske, Robert E. & Ferrante, Joan M. (July 1986). "Memoirs of Fellows and Corresponding Fellows of the Medieval Academy of America: Charles Southward Singleton". Speculum. 61 (3). Cambridge, Massachusetts: The Mediaeval Academy of America: 765–767. JSTOR 2851651.
- Kaske, Robert E. (Fall 1986). "Pandarus's "Vertue of Corones Tweyne"". The Chaucer Review. 21 (2). University Park: The Pennsylvania State University Press: 226–233. JSTOR 25093997.
- Kaske, Robert E. (1988). "Piers Plowman and Local Iconography: The Font at Eardisley, Herefordshire". Journal of the Warburg and Courtauld Institutes. 51. London: The Warburg Institute: 184–186. doi:10.2307/751272. JSTOR 751272. S2CID 195043271.
- Kaske, Robert E. (1989–1990). "Amnon and Thamar on a Misericord in Hereford Cathedral". Traditio. XLV. New York: Fordham University Press: 1–6. JSTOR 27831237.
- Kaske, Robert E. (1990). "Godfrey's Vengeance for God on Good Friday: Alliterative Morte Arthure, 3430–1". Medium Ævum. LIX (1). The Society for the Study of Mediæval Languages and Literature: 128–133. doi:10.2307/43629289. JSTOR 43629289.

=== Chapters ===
- Kaske, Robert E. (1960d). "Patristic Exegesis in the Criticism of Medieval Literature: The Defense". In Bethurum, Dorothy (ed.). Critical Approaches to Medieval Literature: Selected Papers from the English Institute, 1958–1959. New York: Columbia University Press. pp. 27–60, 158–159. hdl:2027/heb.06547. ISBN 9780231024174. LCCN 60-13104.

- Abridged in Kaske, Robert E. (1968c). "Patristic Exegesis in the Criticism of Medieval Literature: The Defense". In Vasta, Edward (ed.). Interpretations of Piers Plowman. Notre Dame, Indiana: University of Notre Dame Press. pp. 319–338. LCCN 68-12296.; and in Kaske, Robert E. (1969). "from 'Patristic Exegesis: The Defense'". In Burrow, John Anthony (ed.). Geoffrey Chaucer: A Critical Anthology. Harmondsworth: Penguin Books. pp. 233–239. OCLC 493371334.

- Kaske, Robert E. (1963c). ""Hygelac" and "Hygd"". In Greenfield, Stanley B. (ed.). Studies in Old English Literature in Honor of Arthur G. Brodeur. Eugene: University of Oregon Books. pp. 200–206. LCCN 63-24538.

- Reissued with an addendum on page 206 in Kaske, Robert E. (1973). ""Hygelac" and "Hygd"". In Greenfield, Stanley B. (ed.). Studies in Old English Literature in Honor of Arthur G. Brodeur. New York: Russell & Russell. pp. 200–206. ISBN 0-8462-1673-6. LCCN 72-90565.

- Kaske, Robert E. (1961b). "The Aube in Chaucer's Troilus". In Schoeck, Richard J. & Taylor, Jerome (eds.). Troilus and Criseyde & The Minor Poems. Chaucer Criticism. Vol. II. Notre Dame, Indiana: University of Notre Dame Press. pp. 167–179. LCCN 60-10279.
- Kaske, Robert E. (1965). "The Character "Figura" in Le Mystère d'Adam". In Mahoney, John & Keller, John Esten (eds.). Medieval Studies in Honor of Urban Tigner Holmes, Jr. North Carolina Studies in the Romance Languages and Literatures. Vol. 56. Chapel Hill: The University of North Carolina Press. pp. 103–110. JSTOR 10.5149/9781469639130_mahoney.
- Kaske, Robert E. (1967c). "The Eotenas in Beowulf". In Creed, Robert Payson (ed.). Old English Poetry: Fifteen Essays. Providence, Rhode Island: Brown University Press. pp. 285–310. LCCN 67-10212.
- Kaske, Robert E. (1968d). "Beowulf". In Lumiansky, R. M. & Baker, Herschel (eds.). Critical Approaches to Six Major English Works: Beowulf Through Paradise Lost. Philadelphia: University of Pennsylvania Press. pp. 3–40. JSTOR j.ctv512qvn.
- Kaske, Robert E. (1970a). "Gawain's Green Chapel and the Cave at Wetton Mill". In Mandel, Jerome & Rosenberg, Bruce A. (eds.). Medieval Literature and Folklore Studies: Essays in Honor of Francis Lee Utley. New Brunswick, New Jersey: Rutgers University Press. pp. 111–121, 357–358. ISBN 978-0813506760. LCCN 70-127053. SBN 8135-0676-X.
- Kaske, Robert E. (1973). "Chaucer's Marriage Group". In Mitchell, Jerome & Provost, William (eds.). Chaucer the Love Poet. Athens, Georgia: University of Georgia Press. pp. 45–65. ISBN 0-8203-0319-4. LCCN 73-97938.

- Abridged in Kaske, Robert E. (1975). "The Governing Theme of Beowulf". In Tuso, Joseph F. (ed.). Beowulf: The Donaldson Translation, Backgrounds and Sources, Criticism. New York: W. W. Norton & Company. pp. 118–131. ISBN 0-393-04413-0. LCCN 75-17991.

- Kaske, Robert E. (1974). "Holy Church's Speech and the Structure of Piers Plowman". In Rowland, Beryl (ed.). Chaucer and Middle English Studies in Honour of Rossell Hope Robbins. London: George Allen & Unwin. pp. 320–327. doi:10.4324/9780429341786. ISBN 0-04-821030-7. S2CID 241889879.
- Kaske, Robert E. (1976). Fletcher, Harry George & Schulte, Mary Beatrice (eds.). "The Conclusion of the Old English 'Descent into Hell'". Traditio. ΠΑΡΑΔΟΣΙΣ: Studies in Memory of Edwin A. Quain. 32 (S1). New York: Fordham University Press: 47–59. doi:10.1017/S0362152900018377. ISBN 0-8232-0351-4. LCCN 76-20905. S2CID 191684422.
- Kaske, Robert E. (1979). "Clericus Adam and Chaucer's Adam Scriveyn". In Vasta, Edward & Thundy, Zacharias P. (eds.). Chaucerian Problems and Perspectives: Essays Presented to Paul E. Beichner, C.S.C. Notre Dame, Indiana: University of Notre Dame Press. pp. 114–118. ISBN 0-268-00728-4. LCCN 78-62971.
- Kaske, Robert E. (1982). "Sapientia et Fortitudo in the Old English Judith". In Benson, Larry D. & Wenze, Siegfried (eds.). The Wisdom of Poetry: Essays in Early English Literature in Honor of Morton W. Bloomfield. Kalamazoo, Michigan: Medieval Institute Publications. pp. 13–29, 264–268. ISBN 0-918720-15-X. LCCN 82-3577.
- Kaske, Robert E. (1983). "The Seven Status Ecclesiae in Purgatorio XXXII and XXXIII". In Bernardo, Aldo S. & Pellegrini, Anthony L. (eds.). Dante, Petrarch, Boccaccio: Studies in the Italian Trecento in Honor of Charles S. Singleton. Medieval & Renaissance Texts & Studies. Vol. 22. Binghamton: State University of New York at Binghamton. pp. 89–113. ISBN 0-86698-061-X. LCCN 83-717.
- Kaske, Robert E. (1984). "Sir Gawain and the Green Knight". In Masters, George Mallary (ed.). Medieval and Renaissance Studies: Proceedings of the Southeastern Institute of Medieval and Renaissance Studies, Summer 1979. Medieval and Renaissance Series. Vol. 10. Chapel Hill: The University of North Carolina Press. pp. 24–44. ISBN 0-8078-1620-5. ISSN 0076-6089. LCCN 68-54949.
- Kaske, Robert E. (1988). "The Character Hunger in Piers Plowman". In Kennedy, Edward Donald; Waldron, Ronald & Wittig, Joseph S. (eds.). Medieval English Studies Presented to George Kane. Wolfeboro, New Hampshire: D. S. Brewer. pp. 187–197. ISBN 0-85991-262-0. LCCN 87-27209.
- Kaske, Robert E. (1990). "Casualty and Miracle: Philosophical Perspectives in the Knight's Tale and the Man of Law's Tale". In Allen, David G. & White, Robert A. (eds.). Traditions and Innovations: Essays on British Literature of the Middle Ages and the Renaissance. Newark, Delaware: University of Delaware Press. pp. 11–34. ISBN 0-87413-355-6.

=== Reviews ===
- Kaske, Robert E. (December 1959g). "Review: "Piers Plowman" and the Scheme of Salvation: An Interpretation of "Dowel, Dobet, and Dobest", by Robert Worth Frank, Jr". Modern Language Notes. LXXIV (8). Baltimore, Maryland: The Johns Hopkins Press: 730–733. JSTOR 3040398.
- Kaske, Robert E. (January 1963d). "Review: Piers Plowman as a Fourteenth-Century Apocalypse, by Morton W. Bloomfield". The Journal of English and Germanic Philology. LXII (1). Urbana: The University of Illinois: 202–208. JSTOR 27714209.
- Kaske, Robert E. (January 1963e). "Review: Piers the Plowman: Literary Relations of the A and B Texts, by David C. Fowler". The Journal of English and Germanic Philology. LXII (1). Urbana: The University of Illinois: 208–213. JSTOR 27714210.
- Kaske, Robert E. (June 1963f). "Chaucer and Medieval Allegory". ELH. 30 (2). Baltimore, Maryland: The Johns Hopkins Press: 175–192. doi:10.2307/2872089. JSTOR 2872089.
  - A "review article", reviewing A Preface to Chaucer: Studies in Medieval Perspectives, by D. W. Robertson Jr.
- Kaske, Robert E. (July 1966). "Review: Piers Plowman: The Evidence for Authorship, by George Kane". The Journal of English and Germanic Philology. LXV (3). Urbana: The University of Illinois: 583–586. JSTOR 27714923.
- Kaske, Robert E. (October 1966). "Review: Superbia: Studien zum altenglischen Wortschatz, by Hans Schabram". Speculum. XLI (4). Cambridge, Massachusetts: The Mediaeval Academy of America: 762–764. doi:10.2307/2852344. JSTOR 2852344.
- Kaske, Robert E. (January 1967d). "Review: Allegorical Imagery: Some Mediaeval Books and Their Posterity, by Rosemond Tuve". Speculum. XLII (1). Cambridge, Massachusetts: The Mediaeval Academy of America: 196–199. doi:10.2307/2856132. JSTOR 2856132.
- Kaske, Robert E. (September 1968e). "Review: "The Pearl": An Interpretation, by Patricia Margaret Kean". English Language Notes. VI (1). Boulder: University of Colorado: 48–52.
- Kaske, Robert E. (January 1970b). "Review: A Reading of Beowulf, by Edward B. Irving, Jr". The Journal of English and Germanic Philology. LXIX (1). Urbana: The University of Illinois: 159–161. JSTOR 27705832.
- Kaske, Robert E. (1971). "Review: 'Pearl' in its Setting: A Critical Study of the Structure and Meaning of the Middle English Poem, by Ian Bishop". Anglia. 89. Tübingen, Baden-Württemberg: Max Niemeyer Verlag: 13–137. doi:10.1515/angl.1971.1971.89.119.
- Kaske, Robert E. (January 1971). "Review: Theology and Poetry in the Middle English Lyric: A Study of Sacred History and Aesthetic Form, by Sarah Appleton Weber". Speculum. XLVI (1). Cambridge, Massachusetts: The Mediaeval Academy of America: 188–190. doi:10.2307/2855128. JSTOR 2855128.
- Kaske, Robert E. (November 1974). "Review: The Interpretation of Old English Poems, by Stanley B. Greenfield". Modern Philology. 72 (2). The University of Chicago Press: 190–194. doi:10.1086/390557. JSTOR 436745.

=== Other ===
- Kaske, Robert E. (September 25, 1940a). "Quid Ergo?". Xavier University News. Vol. XXVII, no. 1. Cincinnati, Ohio. p. 2.
- Kaske, Robert E. (October 9, 1940b). "Quid Ergo?". Xavier University News. Vol. XXVII, no. 3. Cincinnati, Ohio. p. 2.
- Kaske, Robert E. (October 16, 1940c). "Quid Ergo?". Xavier University News. Vol. XXVII, no. 4. Cincinnati, Ohio. p. 2.
- Kaske, Robert E. (October 23, 1940d). "Quid Ergo?". Xavier University News. Vol. XXVII, no. 5. Cincinnati, Ohio. p. 2.
- Kaske, Robert E. (October 30, 1940e). "Quid Ergo?". Xavier University News. Vol. XXVII, no. 6. Cincinnati, Ohio. p. 2.
- Kaske, Robert E. (November 6, 1940f). "Quid Ergo?". Xavier University News. Vol. XXVII, no. 7. Cincinnati, Ohio. p. 2.
- Kaske, Robert E. (November 20, 1940g). "Quid Ergo?". Xavier University News. Vol. XXVII, no. 8. Cincinnati, Ohio. p. 2.
- Kaske, Robert E. (December 11, 1940h). "Quid Ergo?". Xavier University News. Vol. XXVII, no. 10. Cincinnati, Ohio. p. 2.
- Kaske, Robert E. (December 18, 1940i). "Quid Ergo?". Xavier University News. Vol. XXVII, no. 11. Cincinnati, Ohio. p. 2.
- Kaske, Robert E. (January 15, 1941a). "Quid Ergo?". Xavier University News. Vol. XXVII, no. 12. Cincinnati, Ohio. p. 2.
- Kaske, Robert E. (January 22, 1941b). "Quid Ergo?". Xavier University News. Vol. XXVII, no. 13. Cincinnati, Ohio. p. 2.
- Kaske, Robert E. (February 12, 1941c). "Quid Ergo?". Xavier University News. Vol. XXVII, no. 14. Cincinnati, Ohio. p. 2.
- Kaske, Robert E. (February 19, 1941d). "Quid Ergo?". Xavier University News. Vol. XXVII, no. 15. Cincinnati, Ohio. p. 2.
- Kaske, Robert E. (February 26, 1941e). "Quid Ergo?". Xavier University News. Vol. XXVII, no. 16. Cincinnati, Ohio. p. 2.
- Kaske, Robert E. (March 5, 1941f). "Quid Ergo?". Xavier University News. Vol. XXVII, no. 17. Cincinnati, Ohio. p. 2.
- Kaske, Robert E. (March 12, 1941g). "Quid Ergo?". Xavier University News. Vol. XXVII, no. 18. Cincinnati, Ohio. p. 2.
- Kaske, Robert E. (March 19, 1941h). "Quid Ergo?". Xavier University News. Vol. XXVII, no. 19. Cincinnati, Ohio. p. 2.
- Kaske, Robert E. (April 9, 1941i). "Quid Ergo?". Xavier University News. Vol. XXVII, no. 21. Cincinnati, Ohio. p. 2.
- Kaske, Robert E. (April 23, 1941j). "Quid Ergo?". Xavier University News. Vol. XXVII, no. 22. Cincinnati, Ohio. p. 2.
- Kaske, Robert E. (April 30, 1941k). "Quid Ergo?". Xavier University News. Vol. XXVII, no. 23. Cincinnati, Ohio. p. 2.
- Kaske, Robert E. (May 7, 1941l). "Quid Ergo?". Xavier University News. Vol. XXVII, no. 24. Cincinnati, Ohio. p. 2.
- Kaske, Robert E. (May 14, 1941m). "Quid Ergo?". Xavier University News. Vol. XXVII, no. 25. Cincinnati, Ohio. p. 2.
- Kaske, Robert E. (May 21, 1941n). "Quid Ergo?". Xavier University News. Vol. XXVII, no. 26. Cincinnati, Ohio. p. 2.
- Kaske, Robert E. (October 16, 1941o). "Quid Ergo?". Xavier University News. Vol. XXVIII, no. 3. Cincinnati, Ohio. pp. 2, 6.
- Kaske, Robert E. (October 23, 1941p). "Quid Ergo?". Xavier University News. Vol. XXVIII, no. 4. Cincinnati, Ohio. pp. 2, 6.
- Kaske, Robert E. (November 29, 1941q). "Quid Ergo?". Xavier University News. Vol. XXVIII, no. 7. Cincinnati, Ohio. pp. 4, 8.
- Kaske, Robert E. (December 12, 1941r). "Quid Ergo?". Xavier University News. Vol. XXVIII, no. 8. Cincinnati, Ohio. p. 2.
- Kaske, Robert E. (December 19, 1941s). "Quid Ergo?". Xavier University News. Vol. XXVIII, no. 9. Cincinnati, Ohio. p. 2.
- Kaske, Robert E. (January 15, 1942a). "Quid Ergo?". Xavier University News. Vol. XXVIII, no. 10. Cincinnati, Ohio. p. 2.
- Kaske, Robert E. (January 27, 1942b). "Quid Ergo?". Xavier University News. Vol. XXVIII, no. 11. Cincinnati, Ohio. p. 2.
- Kaske, Robert E. (November 1948). "Sergeant Hinchey's Homecoming". Factotum (2): 13–18. OCLC 1568729.
- Kaske, Robert E. (November 1948). "One Pound, Four Shillings". Factotum (2): 22–25. OCLC 1568729.
- Kaske, Robert E. (November 1948). "Weltschmerz, 1942". Factotum (2): 47. OCLC 1568729.
- Kaske, Robert E. (May 1949a). "Prime Wisdom". Factotum (3): 9. OCLC 1568729.
- Kaske, Robert E. (May 1949b). "Kohala Summit". Factotum (3): 10. OCLC 1568729.
- Kaske, Robert E.; Morris, Edward P. & Kirkwood, Gordon M. (1980). "Hutton, James". Individual Memorial Statements. Cornell University. Archived from the original on December 9, 2019.
- Kaske, Robert E.; Slatoff, Walter J. & Parrish, Stephen M. (1980). "French, Walter Hoyt". Individual Memorial Statements. Cornell University. Archived from the original on August 27, 2021.

== Bibliography ==
- "At Work at Cornell". Cornell Alumni News. 78 (8). Cornell Alumni Association: 13–23. April 1974. Archived from the original on December 6, 2019.
- Colby-Hall, Alice M.; Hill, Thomas D. & Wetherbee, Winthrop (1989). "Kaske, Robert Earl". Individual Memorial Statements. Cornell University. Archived from the original on February 24, 2019.
- Fifty-First Report of the Board of Trustees of the University of Illinois for the Two Years Ending June 30, 1962. Urbana: University of Illinois. 1962.
- Fifty-Second Report of the Board of Trustees of the University of Illinois for the Two Years Ending June 30, 1964. Urbana: University of Illinois. 1964.
- Groos, Arthur; Brown, Emerson Jr.; Hill, Thomas D.; Mazzotta, Giuseppe & Wittig, Joseph S., eds. (1986). Magister Regis: Studies in Honor of Robert Earl Kaske. New York: Fordham University Press. ISBN 0-8232-1161-4. LCCN 86-80020.
- Hill, Thomas D. (Fall 1989). "In Memoriam: Robert E. Kaske (1921–89)" (PDF). Old English Newsletter. 23 (1): 14. ISSN 0030-1973.
- Hill, Thomas D. (1996). "R. E. Kaske, Medieval Christian Literary Imagery: A Review of Reviews". Mediaevalia. 19. Binghamton: State University of New York at Binghamton: 261–272. ISSN 0361-946X.
- History of the 819th Tank Destroyer Battalion (PDF). October 1945.
- Kane, George; Leyerle, John & Robinson, Fred C. (July 1990). "Memoirs of Fellows and Corresponding Fellows of the Medieval Academy of America: Robert Earl Kaske". Speculum. 65 (3). Cambridge, Massachusetts: The Mediaeval Academy of America: 818–820. JSTOR 2864141.
- Powell, William S., ed. (1960). The Graduate School Dissertations and Theses, First Supplement, 1946–1959. University of North Carolina Library Studies. Vol. 3. Chapel Hill: The University of North Carolina Library.
- Renthrop, James A., ed. (1942). The Musketeer. Vol. XIX. Cincinnati, Ohio: Xavier University.
- Robinson, Fred C. (1990). "Robert Earl Kaske, 1921–1989". In Oizumi, Akio & Takamiya, Toshiyuki (eds.). Medieval English Studies: Past and Present. Tokyo: Eichosha Co., Ltd. pp. 239–243. ISBN 4-268-00014-3.
- Robinson, Fred C. (1991). "Robert E. Kaske". In Alford, John A. & Tavormina, M. Teresa (eds.). The Yearbook of Langland Studies. Vol. 5. East Lansing, Michigan: Colleagues Press. pp. 1–5. doi:10.1484/J.YLS.2.302891. ISBN 0-937191-43-4. ISSN 0890-2917.
- Sowell, Madison U. (1989). "In Memoriam: Robert Earl Kaske" (PDF). Journal of the Rocky Mountain Medieval and Renaissance Association. 10. The Rocky Mountain Medieval and Renaissance Association: 118–119. Archived from the original (PDF) on December 24, 2021.
- Stanley, Eric G. (September 1991). "Robert E. Kaske". Notes and Queries. New Series. 38 (3). Oxford: Oxford University Press: 285. doi:10.1093/notesj/38.3.285. ISSN 0029-3970.
