= Kenneth Neill Cameron =

British-born literary scholar and Shelley expert (1908–1994)

- Born: 15 September 1908; Barrow-in-Furness, England
- Died: 14 March 1994 (aged 85); New York City, United States
- Occupation: Literary scholar
- Known for: Studies of Percy Bysshe Shelley and English Romanticism
- Spouse: Mary Owen Cameron (m. 1945)
- Children: 1 daughter

Kenneth Neill Cameron (15 September 1908 – 14 March 1994) was a British-born literary scholar who grew up in Canada. He became an authority on the poet Percy Bysshe Shelley and his circle of English Romantic writers. Cameron was also a lifelong Marxist who wrote about dialectical materialism, the Marxist theory of history, and the Soviet Union.

== Early life and education ==
Cameron was born in Barrow-in-Furness, England, and emigrated to Canada with his family at the age of five. His father was a shipyard worker who had gotten a posting as works manager at a Montreal shipyard. Cameron was raised in a French neighborhood, and graduated from McGill University. In 1931 he was elected a Rhodes Scholar and studied at Pembroke College, Oxford. It was at Oxford that he became interested in the life and work of Percy Shelley. In summer of 1934, Cameron visited the USSR for the first time. Upon his return to Canada, he served as Executive Secretary of the Canadian League Against War and Fascism in Toronto in 1934-35; he was also teaching classes on historical materialism to university students, and on Marxist economics to steelworkers.

Cameron did graduate work at the University of Wisconsin–Madison, earning a Ph.D. in 1939. His doctoral dissertation was "Shelley: Political, Social and Economic Thought in His Prose and Poetry".

== Academic career ==
Cameron taught in the English Department at Indiana University from 1939 to 1952. Throughout the 1940s, he published scholarly papers, mostly on Shelley, in academic journals such as The Sewanee Review, PMLA, Modern Language Quarterly, Modern Language Notes, Notes and Queries, Journal of English and Germanic Philology, and English Literary History. These years of research culminated in his 1950 biography, The Young Shelley: Genesis of a Radical, which redefined Shelley studies by closely examining the poet's work in its historical and political context. In 1952 Cameron joined the Carl H. Pforzheimer Library in New York as editor of Shelley and His Circle, overseeing the publication of its first four volumes between 1961 and 1970.

In 1954 Cameron wrote a comic novel, The Enormous Turtle, under the pseudonym "Warren Madden". The book chronicled his family's mishap-filled cross-country trip in a trailer to the Huntington Library in San Marino, California.

In 1963 Cameron was appointed Professor of English at New York University, where he remained until his retirement as emeritus professor in 1975. He was awarded an honorary D.Litt. by McGill University in 1971. His final book of literary scholarship was Shelley: The Golden Years (1974).

== Marxist writings ==
As his academic career wound down, Cameron pursued a longtime interest in Marxist studies. In 1946 he had run a Marxist school for steelworkers in Gary, Indiana, until the school was closed in 1952 due to McCarthy era pressures. He wrote a series of books in which he sought to promote "the scientific spirit of inquiry of Marx, Engels and Lenin". He engaged in debates about the Marxian interpretation of history, philosophy, science, and the role of the Soviet Union in books such as Humanity and Society: A World History (1972), Marx and Engels Today: A Modern Dialogue on Philosophy and History (1976), Marxism: The Science of Society (1985), Stalin: Man of Contradiction (1987), and Dialectical Materialism and Modern Science (1994).

== Later life and death ==
In 1978 a volume of essays in Cameron's honor, The Evidence of the Imagination: Studies of Interactions Between Life and Art in English Romantic Literature, was published by his fellow scholars and former students. In 1982 the Keats-Shelley Association of America presented him with its first Distinguished Scholar Award.

On 14 March 1994, Kenneth Cameron died of pneumonia in New York City at age 85. He was survived by his wife, Mary Owen Cameron, a daughter and two grandchildren.

== Bibliography ==
=== Selected articles ===
- "The Social Philosophy of Shelley". The Sewanee Review. 50 (4): 457–466. October–December 1942. JSTOR 27537319.
- "Rasselas and Alastor: A Study in Transmutation". Studies in Philology. 40 (1): 58–78. January 1943. JSTOR 4172604.
- "The Political Symbolism of Prometheus Unbound". PMLA. 58 (3): 728–753. September 1943. JSTOR 458831.
- "Shelley and the Reformers". ELH. 12 (1): 62–85. March 1945. JSTOR 2871600.
- "A New Shelley Legend". Journal of English and Germanic Philology. 45 (4). October 1946.
- "The Planet-Tempest Passage in Epipsychidion". PMLA. 63 (3): 950–972. September 1948. JSTOR 459692.
- "The New Scholasticism". College English: 432–38. May 1951.
- "Shelley Scholarship: 1940–1953. A Critical Survey". Keats-Shelley Journal. 3: 89–109. Winter 1954. JSTOR 30212507.
- "Shelley As Philosophical and Social Thinker: Some Modern Evaluations". Studies in Romanticism. 21 (3): 357–366. Fall 1982.

=== Books ===
- Practice in English Communication. Boston: Houghton Mifflin. 1944. LCCN 44004318. Co-authored with Clark Emery and Robert M. Gorrell.
- The Young Shelley: Genesis of a Radical. New York: The Macmillan Company. 1950. OCLC 362798.
- The Enormous Turtle. Indianapolis: Bobbs-Merrill Co. 1954. OCLC 1456618. Published under the pseudonym Warren Madden.
- Shelley and His Circle, 1773–1822: Volumes 1 and 2. Cambridge: Harvard University Press. 1961. LCCN 60005393. Edited by Cameron.
- The Esdaile Notebook: A Volume of Early Poems. New York: Alfred A. Knopf. 1964. OCLC 642668. Volume of early Shelley poems, edited by Cameron.
- Shelley and His Circle, 1773–1822: Volumes 3 and 4. Cambridge: Harvard University Press. 1970. ISBN 0674806115. Edited by Cameron.
- Humanity and Society: A World History. Bloomington: Indiana University Press. 1972. ISBN 978-0253139306.
- Romantic Rebels: Essays on Shelley and His Circle. Cambridge: Harvard University Press. 1973. ISBN 978-0674779372. These essays, edited by Cameron, originally appeared in volumes 1-4 of Shelley and His Circle.
- Shelley: The Golden Years. Cambridge: Harvard University Press. 1974. ISBN 978-0674031609.
- Marx and Engels Today: A Modern Dialogue on Philosophy and History. Hicksville, New York: Exposition Press. 1976. ISBN 978-0682485128.
- Poems for Lovers and Rebels. Chilmark, Massachusetts: Squibnocket Press. 1977. LCCN 77151479. Etchings by Kingsley Parker.
- Marxism: The Science of Society: An Introduction. South Hadley, Massachusetts: Bergin & Garvey. 1985. ISBN 978-0897890519.
- Stalin: Man of Contradiction. Toronto: New Canada Publications. 1987. ISBN 978-0920053973.
- Atmospheric Destruction and Human Survival. Santa Cruz, California: CNS/CES. 1992. LCCN 93136071.
- Marxism: A Living Science. New York: International Publishers. 1993. ISBN 978-0717807079. Revised edition of Marxism: The Science of Society.
- Dialectical Materialism and Modern Science. New York: International Publishers. 1994. ISBN 978-0717807086.
