= Old Straight Road =

Concept in Tolkien writings

The Old Straight Road allows the Elves to sail from Middle-earth to Valinor.

The Old Straight Road, the Straight Road, the Lost Road, or the Lost Straight Road, is J. R. R. Tolkien's conception, in his fantasy world of Arda, that his Elves are able to sail to the earthly paradise of Valinor, realm of the godlike Valar. The tale is mentioned in The Silmarillion and in The Lord of the Rings, and documented in The Lost Road and Other Writings. The Elves are immortal, but may grow weary of the world, and then sail across the Great Sea to reach Valinor. The men of Númenor are persuaded by Sauron, servant of the first Dark Lord Melkor, to attack Valinor to get the immortality they feel should be theirs. The Valar ask for help from the creator, Eru Ilúvatar. He destroys Númenor and its army, in the process reshaping Arda into a sphere, and separating it and its continent of Middle-earth from Valinor so that men can no longer reach it. Elves can still set sail from the shores of Middle-earth in ships, bound for Valinor: they sail into the Uttermost West, following the Old Straight Road.

Scholars have noted the importance of the theme to Tolkien, as he revisited it repeatedly. His early mention of the Straight Road as being a level bridge recalls Bifröst, the bridge between the earthly Midgard and the gods' home of Asgard in Norse mythology. Other possible inspirations for the theme include a literary crux in Beowulf in the shape of the character Scyld Scefing. He arrives in the world as a baby in a boat filled with gifts, and he departs from it in a ship-burial, with the odd feature that the ship is not set on fire, as in the typical Viking ritual. The scholar Tom Shippey suggests that Tolkien may have felt that Scyld is being sent back to the gods across the Western sea via a kind of Straight Road, and that Tolkien perhaps created his Valar and their home Valinor to explain that gap in Beowulf. His poem "A Walking Song", which occurs in different versions at the start and end of The Lord of the Rings, also alludes to the theme.

== Narratives ==
=== The Silmarillion ===
The Downfall of Númenor and the Changing of the World. The intervention of Eru Ilúvatar cataclysmically reshaped Arda into a sphere, removing Valinor from Arda, so that Men could no longer reach it by sailing over the Great Sea, Belegaer. The Elves however could still follow the Old Straight Road, sailing into the West from Middle-earth.

In the Second Age of Middle-earth, the godlike Valar give the island of Númenor, in the Great Sea to the West of Middle-earth, to the three loyal houses of Men who had aided the Elves in the war against Morgoth. Through the favour of the Valar, the Dúnedain were granted wisdom, power and longer life, beyond that of other Men. The isle of Númenor lay closer to the Valar's earthly paradise of Valinor, on the continent of Aman, than to Middle-earth. The fall of Númenor came about through the influence of Sauron, the chief servant of the fallen Vala Melkor, who wished to conquer Middle-earth. (Note: Tolkien 1977, Akallabêth)

The Númenóreans took Sauron prisoner. He quickly enthralled their king, Ar-Pharazôn, urging him to seek the immortality that the Valar had apparently denied him. Sauron persuaded them to wage war against the Valar to seize the immortality denied them. Ar-Pharazôn raised the mightiest army and fleet Númenor had ever seen, and sailed to Valinor. The Valar called on the creator, Ilúvatar, for help. When Ar-Pharazôn landed, Ilúvatar destroyed his forces and sent a great wave to submerge Númenor, killing all but those Númenóreans, led by Elendil, who had remained loyal to the Valar, and who escaped to Middle-earth. The world was remade, and Aman was removed beyond the Uttermost West, so that Men could not sail there to threaten it.

The Elves, however, can still sail into the "Uttermost West", on what to Men is the Lost Road to Valinor; Cirdan the Shipwright, at the Grey Havens of Lindon, still builds ships in the Third Age for Elves who wish to leave Middle-earth. (Note: Tolkien 1977, ch. 20 "Of the Fifth Battle: Nirnaeth Arnoediad") (Note: Tolkien 1977, "Of the Rings of Power and the Third Age") Sauron's physical form was destroyed.

=== "The Fall of Númenor" ===
Tolkien wrote "The Fall of Númenor" in 1936. After the island had been drowned and the world remade, the loyal Númenóreans retained a memory of the Old Straight Road, and some tried to build ships that could "rise above the waters of the world and hold to the imagined seas." (Note: Tolkien 1987, "The Fall of Númenor", sections 10 and 11) The "old line of the world" lingered like

a plain of air, or ... a straight vision that bends not to the hidden curving of the earth, or to a level bridge that rises imperceptibly but surely above the heavy air of earth. And of old many of the Númenóreans could see or half see the paths of the True West, ... [able perhaps to make out] the peaks of Taniquetil at the end of the straight road, high above the world.

=== Two unfinished time travel novels ===
Tolkien made two attempts at a time travel novel, both remaining unfinished: first in the 1936 The Lost Road, and then in 1945 The Notion Club Papers. In both of them, he provides a frame story in which a father-and-son pair of modern Englishmen visit past times in dreams, successively going further back until they reach Númenor and discover the story of the Lost Road. In each case, one of the time travellers has a name which means "Elf-friend", tying him directly to the loyal Númenórean Elendil, whose name has the same meaning in the classical Elf-language, Quenya.

Time-travelling frame story characters with the periods they visit
| Period | Second Age Over 9,000 years ago | Lombards (568–774) | Anglo-Saxons (c. 450–1066) | England 20th century | |
| Language of names | Quenya (in Númenor) | Germanic | Old English | Modern English | Meaning of names |
|---|---|---|---|---|---|
| Character 1 | Elendil | Alboin | Ælfwine | Alwin | Elf-friend |
| Character 2 | Herendil | Audoin | Eadwine | Edwin | Bliss-friend |
| Character 3 | Valandil ("Valar-friend") | ——— | Oswine | Oswin, cf. Oswald | God-friend |

=== The Lord of the Rings ===
At the end of the main narrative of The Lord of the Rings, in the last chapter of The Return of the King, the protagonist Frodo, broken by the quest to destroy the One Ring, is allowed to leave Middle-earth, sailing from the Grey Havens over the Sea and out of the world on the Straight Road to find peace in Valinor. (Note: Tolkien 1955, Book 6, chapter 9 "The Grey Havens") He is able to do so, as a mortal Hobbit, because the Elf Arwen has given him her place; she has chosen to marry a mortal man, King Aragorn, and so to die from the world as men do. (Note: Tolkien 1955, Appendix D "The Tale of Aragorn and Arwen")

There are two versions of "A Walking Song" in the novel, one near the beginning of the book when Frodo is just setting out, not knowing where his quest may lead, one in the last chapter. (Note: Tolkien 1954a, Book 1, chapter 3 "Three is Company") (Note: Tolkien 1955, Book 6, chapter 9 "The Grey Havens") Especially in the second, when he knows he will soon leave Middle-earth, Frodo sings of "the hidden paths that run / West of the Moon, East of the Sun". The verse alludes to his coming journey on the Straight Road, the wording subtly changed to be more definite, even final:

Still round the corner there may wait
A new road or a secret gate,
And though I oft have passed them by,
A day will come at last when I
Shall take the hidden paths that run
West of the Moon, East of the Sun.

== Analysis ==
=== Cosmology ===
In Tolkien's conception, Arda was created specifically as the place for Elves and Men to live in. It is envisaged in a flat Earth cosmology, with the stars, and later also the sun and moon, revolving around it. Tolkien's legendarium addresses the spherical Earth paradigm by depicting a catastrophic transition from a flat to a spherical world, the Akallabêth, in which Valinor becomes inaccessible to mortal Men. All that is left is the memory of the old straight road, or the tale of the Elves able to travel by it. When Men die, they leave the world of Arda entirely, perhaps to go to a heaven. Elves, on the other hand, cannot leave "the circles of the world", and are constrained to go to Valinor, or, if they die in battle, to the Halls of Mandos, from where they may be allowed to return to Valinor. Tolkien stated that "the passage over Sea is not Death. The 'mythology' is Elf-centred. According to it there was at first an actual Earthly Paradise, home and realm of the Valar, as a physical part of the earth."

Fates of Elves and Men in Tolkien's legendarium. Elves are immortal, but may grow weary of Middle-earth, and follow the Old Straight Road into the Uttermost West to reach Valinor. Men are mortal, and when they die they go beyond the circles of the world, even the Elves not knowing where that might be.

=== Major theme ===
Because of the evil implanted by Sauron in the minds of the men of Númenor, the world became bent, so men could no longer sail the Straight Road westwards to Valinor. Tom Shippey writes that Tolkien's personal First World War experience was Manichean: evil seemed at least as powerful as good, and could easily have been victorious, a strand which can also be seen in Middle-earth.

The image of the Straight Road was, Shippey writes, evidently important to Tolkien, as he revisited it repeatedly in his legendarium. The two time travel novels both foundered on the problem that while they made perfect sense to him as frame stories, which he worked out in some detail, this was at the expense of their actual narratives, which he never got around to writing.

Verlyn Flieger writes that Tolkien's essay "Beowulf: the Monsters and the Critics", his "On Fairy-Stories", and The Lost Road all indicate his "desire to pass through that open door into Other Time." She adds that The Lost Road illustrated his "vision of the lost paradise and the longing to return to it" which "became a more and more powerful element in his later fiction", forming eventually the "underpinning" of The Lord of the Rings.

Stuart D. Lee and Elizabeth Solopova state that the stories of the variously named time-travelling Eriol/Ǽlfwine, The Lost Road, and The Notion Club Papers should be seen as fragments of a single-purposed attempt by Tolkien to form a unified story. This places the events of the Silmarillion (legendarium) as part of the history or prehistory of the Earth, many thousand years ago. A central event in that story is the reshaping of the world, leaving only the Straight Road as the way to the earthly paradise. They quote Christopher Tolkien's explanation in The Lost Road and Other Writings:

my father was envisaging a massive and explicit linking of his own legends with those of many other peoples and times: all concerned with the stories and the dreams of peoples who dwelt by the coasts of the great Western Sea.

=== Scyld Scefing ===
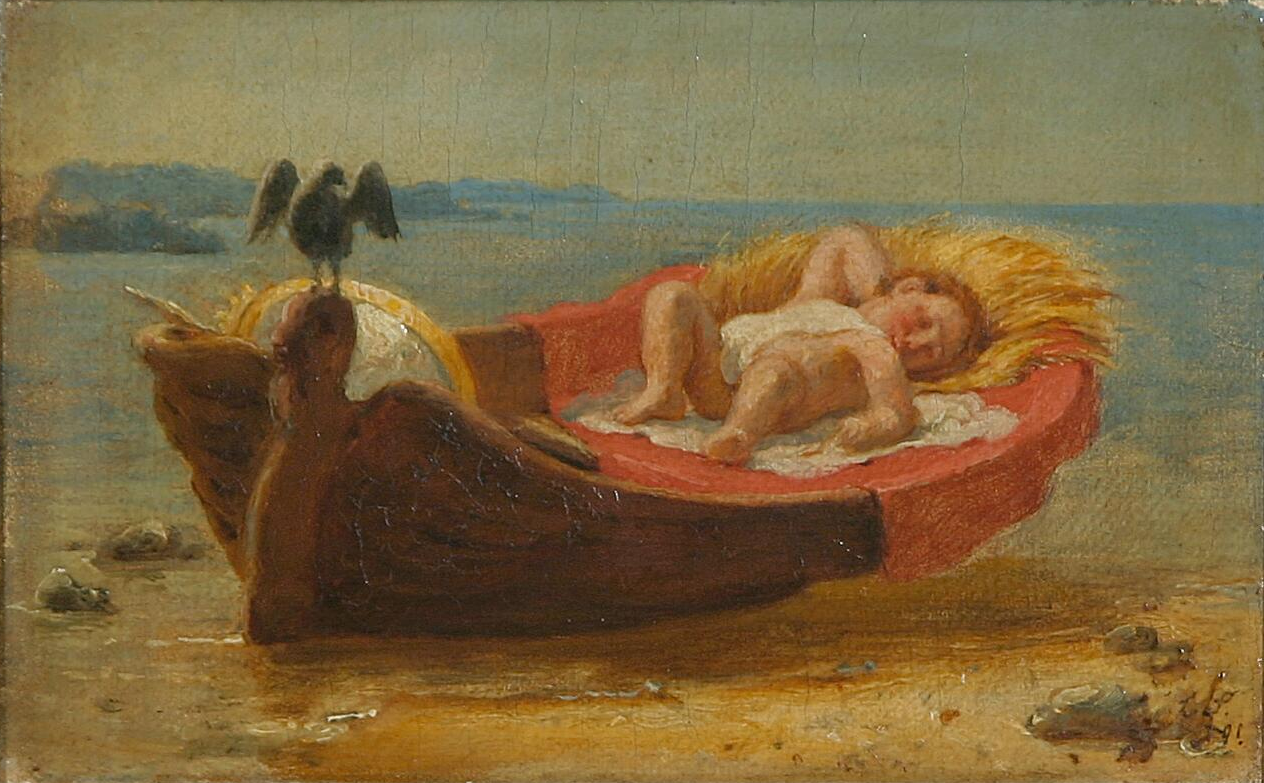
Scyld Scefing arrives in the world as a baby in a boat, with a sheaf of corn. 1891 painting by Herman Siegumfeldt

Beowulf, an Anglo-Saxon poem that Tolkien knew well, contains, among its cruxes – its unexplained or problematic passages, a mention of Scyld Scefing at the start. This, Shippey notes, has several odd features, making it the kind of thing that attracted Tolkien's interest. "Scefing" looks like a patronymic, but cannot be as Scyld's father is not known. It could equally mean "with a sheaf", evidently a symbol. When Scyld dies, he is given a ship burial, being placed in a ship supplied with many gifts for his one-way journey into the afterlife. However, and uniquely for a Viking ship burial, the ship is not set on fire, so in practical terms the ship would surely, Shippey writes, have been looted. Dimitra Fimi notes that Beowulf (lines 26–52) describes Scyld's funeral ship sailing "on its own accord" to its unknown harbour.

The cosmology of this story is not explained, beyond the cryptic statement that "those" had sent Scyld as a baby into the world. Shippey notes that the pronoun þā ("those") is, unusually for such an insignificant part of speech, both stressed and alliterated, a heavy emphasis (marked in the text):

Nalæs hī hine lǣssan / lācum tēodan,
þeodgestrēonum, / þon þā dydon
þē hine æt frumsceafte / forð onsendon
ǣnne ofer ǣðe / umborwesende.
þā gǣt hīe him āsetton / segen geldenne
hēah ofer hēafod, / lēton holm beran,
gēafon on gārsecg; / him wæs geōmor sefa,
murnende mōd. / Men ne cunnon
secgan tŏ sōðe, / selerǣdende,
hæleð under heofenum, / hwā þǣm hlæste onfēng.

— Beowulf lines 43–52
Translation:

In no way they him less / with gifts endowed,
with folk-wealth, / than those did,
who him at outset / forth sent
alone over waves / infant-being.
Then yet they set up / standard golden
high over head, / they let sea carry,
gave to ocean; / in them was gloomy heart,
mourning mind. / Men not can
say for truth, / hall-counsellors,
heroes under heaven, who that cargo received.

— John Porter's "literal" 1991 translation

In The Lost Road and Other Writings, Christopher Tolkien quotes from one of his father's lectures: "the [Beowulf] poet is not explicit, and the idea was probably not fully formed in his mind—that Scyld went back to some mysterious land whence he had come. He came out of the Unknown beyond the Great Sea, and returned into It". Tolkien explains that "the symbolism (what we should call the ritual) of a departure over the sea whose further shore was unknown; and an actual belief in a magical land or otherworld located 'over the sea', can hardly be distinguished."

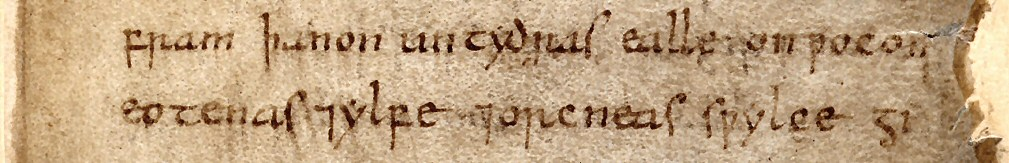
Tolkien habitually used difficult passages in Beowulf as a source of inspiration, for instance creating Orcs from line 112, eotenas ond ylfe ond orcneas, "ogres and elves and demon-corpses".

Shippey comments that a ship-burial must have meant "a belief that the desired afterworld was across the western sea", and that Tolkien mirrored this with his "Undying Lands" across the sea from Middle-earth. In short, the Beowulf poet had "what one can only call an inkling of Tolkien's own image of 'the Lost Straight Road'." He asks who the unnamed beings were, and whether the ship was to sail into the West on a Lost Road to return to them. They are plainly acting on behalf of God; being plural, they cannot be him, but they are supernatural. He suggests that Tolkien considered their nature, as godlike mythological demiurges, and that this perhaps prompted him to create the Valar, given that Tolkien habitually "deriv[ed] inspiration from a philological crux", for instance inventing Elves, Ettens, and Orcs from a line in Beowulf.

Further to Beowulf's account of Scyld and his strange departure, Tolkien wrote a poem, "King Sheave", on the Scyld Scefing theme. Sheave is the father of Beow ("Barley"), making him a corn-god. He is lost from his bed, but found again alive and well outside, recalling Christ's empty tomb and his being found alive, walking in a garden. The reign of King Sheave is described as "the Golden Years", linking him to Fróði of the Poetic Edda, who is also a Christ-figure. Tolkien makes the connection with the time-travellers and Elendil, by having the Sheave story told by Ælfwine in the Anglo-Saxon King Alfred's hall.

=== Bifröst ===
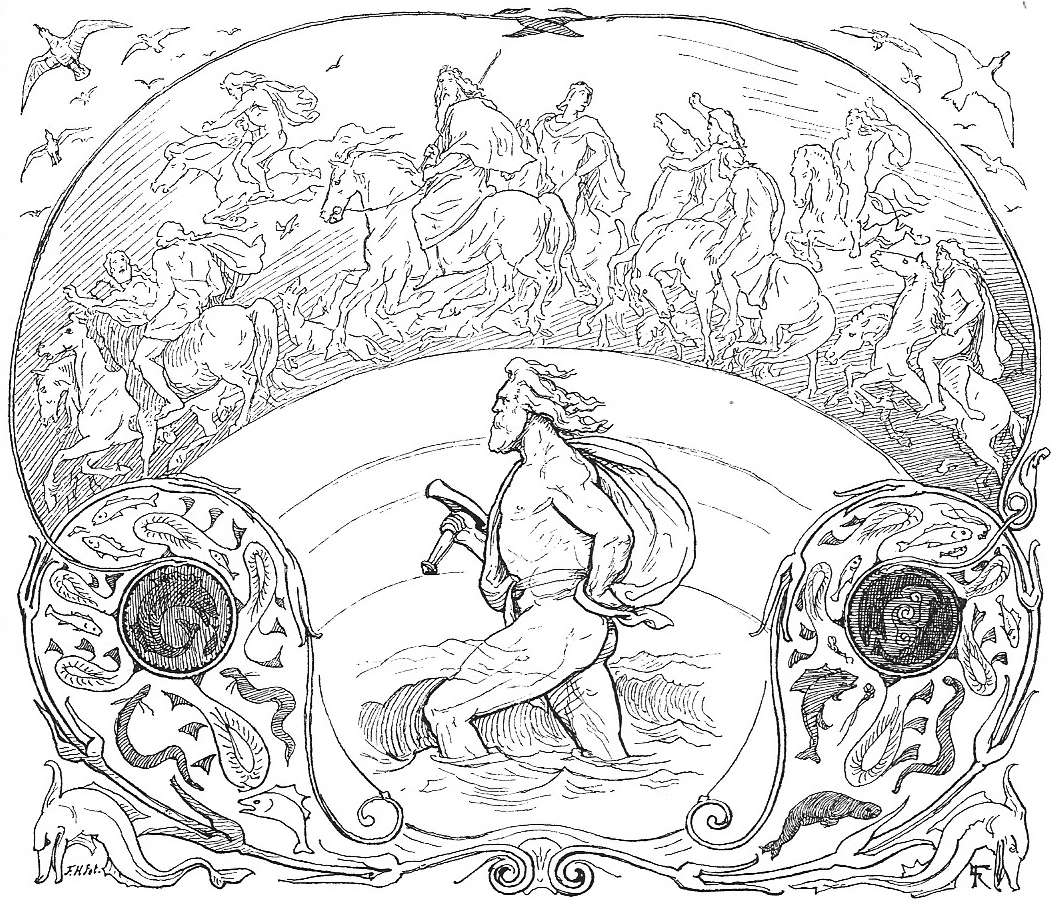
In Norse mythology, Bifröst is the rainbow bridge between the earthly realm of Midgard and the god's realm of Asgard. 1895 drawing by Lorenz Frølich

Elizabeth Whittingham comments that the "level bridge" of "The Fall of Númenor" reminds readers of Bifröst in Norse mythology, the rainbow bridge that links Midgard and Asgard. The level bridge "imperceptibly" departs from the earth at a tangent, but enough of the earlier cosmology remains "in the mind of the Gods" for the Elves and the Valar to be able to travel that Straight Road. John Garth similarly states that while the Straight Road linking Valinor with Middle-Earth after the Second Age mirrors Bifröst, the Valar themselves resemble the Æsir, the gods of Asgard.

Garth notes further that two central figures in poems that Tolkien knew, Väinämöinen in the Finnish Kalevala, and Hiawatha in Henry Wadsworth Longfellow's The Song of Hiawatha, both leave the world in boats, sailing off into the sky, as the Elves do when following the Old Straight Road into the West. The protagonist of the first piece of Tolkien's legendarium, Eärendel, similarly sails a ship out of Arda into the sky. His ship carries the last of the Silmarils, shining brilliantly as the Evening Star. (Note: Tolkien 1977, ch. 24 "Of the Voyage of Eärendil and the War of Wrath")

=== Other inspirations ===
Fimi comments that Tolkien seemed to be intending to use his translation of the Anglo-Saxon poem "The Seafarer" to express "Ælfwine's desire to sail upon the western sea and find the 'Straight Road', the 'Lost Road' that leads to Valinor and the Elves even after the world is 'bent'." Norma Roche, writing in Mythlore, notes the parallels between Valinor and the Celtic island paradise described in the story of St Brendan, and that Tolkien wrote a poem named "Imram", named after the immram genre of Irish tradition, for The Notion Club Papers. Fimi was surprised that Tolkien apparently linked immram in the shape of St. Brendan's voyages to Ælfwine's journey into the uttermost West, and went on doing so. All the same, she notes the parallels between "the Western happy otherworld island and the geography and function of Valinor", commenting that the Celtic otherworld derives from the earthly paradise, the Garden of Eden, of the Bible.

== Legacy ==
Ursula Le Guin's Earthsea series has been described as directly influenced by Tolkien. The Tolkien scholar David Bratman writes that there is a recurring theme of locale in her fantasy stories, especially in her 1985 novel, Always Coming Home. In that work, she named a path which roughly tracks California highway 29 as "The Old Straight Road". Bratman states that the story conveys "a sense of a mythology" of the region.
