= Critical edition (opera) =

A critical edition of an opera has been defined by American musicologist Philip Gossett as "an edition that bases itself wherever possible on the very finest and most accurate sources for an opera. That means that it must study the entire performance history of a work."

Gossett continues:

In some cases of course we have an autograph manuscript, and that helps us, but it is also where many of the problems start, because composers are known to have made mistakes in their autograph manuscripts. And therefore we are required—we feel it is necessary—to intervene and to correct errors that sometimes have been perpetrated on these works by printed editions from the beginning, so they are just mistakes in the old editions, simple mistakes.

The emergence of critical editions of many works from the 19th-century Italian operatic repertory did not begin until the 1950s and resulted from the revival of interest from that time forward in the bel canto era—early 1800s to approximately 1850 and known as the primo ottocento—written by Gioachino Rossini, Vincenzo Bellini, Gaetano Donizetti, and Giuseppe Verdi, in addition to many other relatively minor composers who composed many works. But, as musicologist Ellen Rosand also notes, "the editing of operatic works from the 17th century, the 18th century and 19th century provides many considerable challenges.

In an online essay – "What is a critical edition?: Answers to Questions You Never Thought to Ask" – which focuses primarily on Rossini, musicologist Patricia Brauner of the Center for Italian Opera Studies at the University of Chicago explains several different aspects of a critical edition, including the process of producing published editions and the ultimate value of them for performers and conductors.

Musicologists such as Gossett and Roger Parker represent parallel approaches to the works of the Italian bel canto era. The former is now General Editor of The Critical Edition of the Works of Giuseppe Verdi at the University of Chicago's Center for Italian Opera Studies – in addition to being an acknowledged expert in preparing critical editions of the operas of Rossini – while the other is Professor of Music at King's College London and editor of many of the operas of Donizetti, as well as having written extensively on Verdi. He is the founding co-editor (with Arthur Groos) of the Cambridge Opera Journal, and he continues as General Editor (with Gabriele Dotto, who headed the editorial division of Ricordi until 2001) of The Critical Edition of the Operas of Gaetano Donizetti published by Casa Ricordi of Milan.

Gossett clarifies how the existence of these editions may affect performances:

We don’t believe that everybody has to perform just what we do, because that’s not what they did in the nineteenth century, not what composers did or expected, but we do think that performers should base their work on the finest editions possible, and that’s what we try to produce.

The pioneering work of the major Italian music publishing house, Casa Ricordi, reveals how extensive the company's involvement in restoring the work of 19th-century composers Rossini, Bellini, Donizetti, and Verdi has been. Since 2007, the German publishing house Bärenreiter-Verlag has been producing editions of Rossini's operas, having become the successor to the Fondazione Rossini Pesaro, which produced many editions between 1979 and 2005. Today, many are still published by Ricordi in Europe and in the US by the University of Chicago.
