= Carlo d'Aquino =

Italian Dante scholar

Reverend Carlo d'Aquino
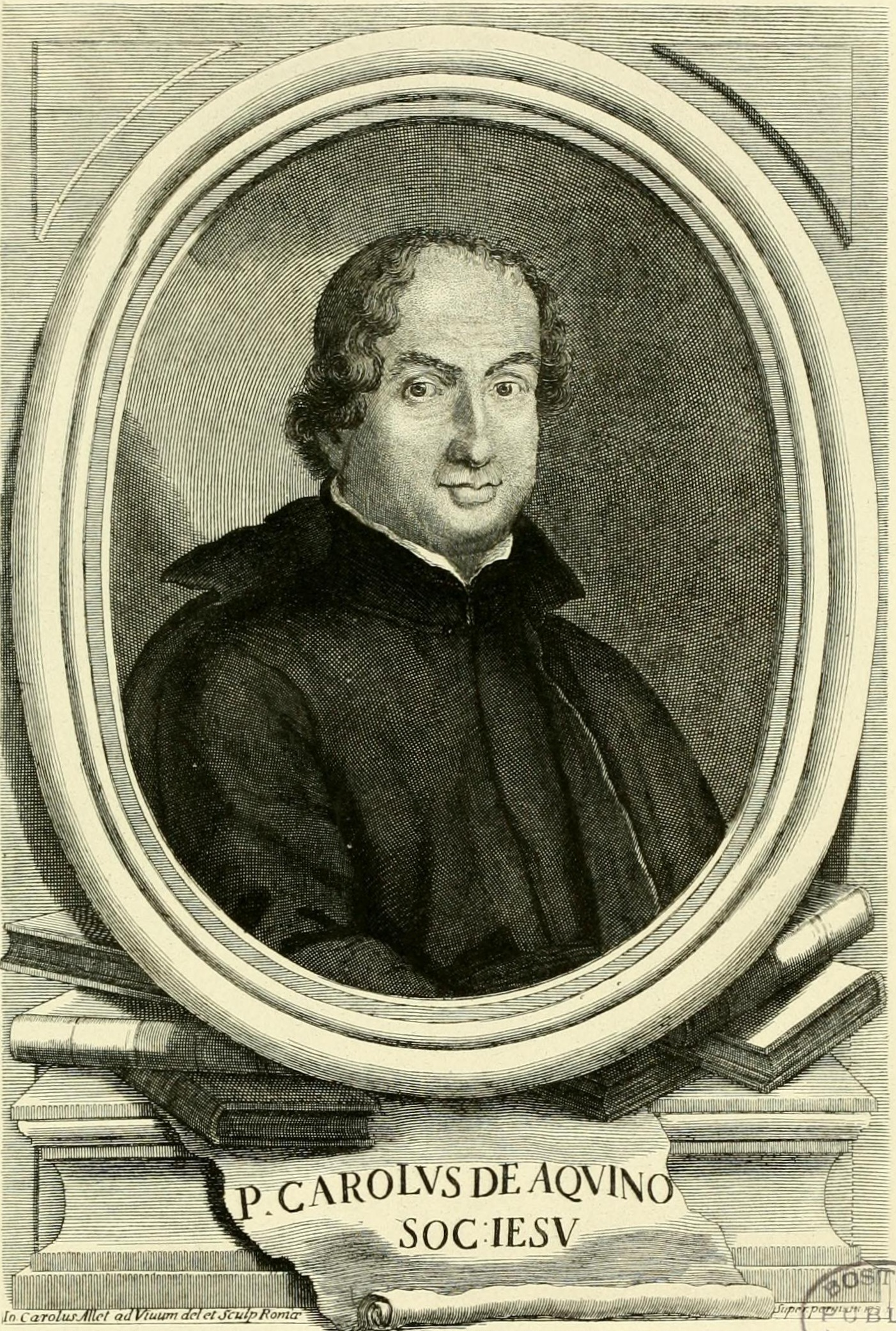
- Carlo d'Aquino
- Born: April 15, 1654; Naples, Kingdom of Naples
- Died: 17 May 1737 (aged 83); Rome, Papal States
- Other name: Alcone Sirio
- Occupations: Catholic priest; Translator; University teacher
- Known for: First translation of the Divine Comedy in Latin
- Parent(s): Bartolomeo d'Aquino and Barbara d'Aquino (née Stampa)

Academic work
- Discipline: Dante scholar; Classical scholar; Latinist
- Institutions: Roman College
- Notable students: Giovanni Mario Crescimbeni

Carlo d'Aquino (15 April 1654 – 17 May 1737) was an Italian jesuit and scholar. He was one of the most prominent Dante scholars of his generation.

== Biography ==
Carlo d'Aquino was born at Naples in the year 1654. He was the son of Bartolomeo, prince of Caramanico, and of Barbara Stampa, a Milanese lady of the family of the marquises of Soncino. He entered the Jesuit Order at the age of fifteen, became professor of rhetoric and prefect of the studies at the Roman College, was afterwards secretary of the same establishment, and after a life spent in literary employment and learned ease at Rome and Tivoli died on 17 May 1737, at the age of 83. He was a member of the Academy of Arcadia in Rome under the pseudonym of Alcone Sirio.

His works, which are numerous, procured him a high reputation, both as a Latin and Italian writer. The earlier chiefly consist of works of polite literature, and the later of dictionaries. His three volumes of “Carmina,” published at Rome, the first in 1701 and the last in 1703, contain many pieces which had previously appeared in a separate shape. The first volume is occupied with six books of epigrams, one book of miscellanies, and a serious parody on the odes attributed to Anacreon, under the title of “Anacreon Recantatus.” In the first ode the poet’s lyre, instead of declining, like Anacreon’s, to sing anything but love, refuses to celebrate aught save religion; the second, instead of asserting the irresistibility of woman, proclaims the invincibility of faith. The author afterwards published a translation of these compositions into Italian at Rome in 1726, under the title of “Palinodie Anacreontiche”. The second volume of the “Carmina” commences with two books of Heroica, one of which, on the coronation of James II of England, contains a passage alluding to one of his predecessors that might almost be deemed prophetic of his successor:

Willelmum, occiduo Regnum qui quærere mundo
Per vastas non horret aquas.

The character of another which follows, a “Genethliacus” in honour of the birth of King James’s ill-fated son, is singular. Sedition is represented as having formed, for the purpose of preventing the king from having a catholic heir, an enchanted image composed of the ashes of the “heretic rebels,” who had been punished for opposing James; but the charm is thwarted by the counter-influence of the image of an infant in solid gold, which James’s wife, the queen of England, presents, as it is an historical fact that she did, to the Virgin of Loreto. The “Heroica” are succeeded by two books of elegies, and one of lyrics, and the third volume is occupied with twelve satires. The “Orationes” of D’Aquino (2 vols., Rome, 1704) also comprise many pieces which had appeared separately. The most interesting is that pronounced on occasion of the funeral obsequies celebrated in honour of James II, by command of Cardinal Barberini, in the Basilica of San Lorenzo fuori le mura at Rome. The work in which this was first printed, “Sacra Exequialia, in Funere Jacobi II. Magnæ Britanniæ Regis, descripta a Carolo de Aquino,” (Rome, 1702) is adorned with numerous plates of the funeral trophies; it was never for sale, and is mentioned by David Clement as very rare, but a copy is in the British Museum. The “Miscellaneorum Libri III.” (Rome, 1725) contain some very miscellaneous critical and philological remarks on ancient and modern authors. The “Fragmenta Historica de Bello Hungarico” (Rome, 1726) is a specimen of a work on the wars of Hungary, begun at the recommendation of Nicola Avancini, a Jesuit connected with the imperial court, who promised to supply materials, and broken off on Avancini’s death. In 1728 was published the greatest poetical work of D’Aquino, “Commedia di Dante Alighieri trasportata in Verso Latino Eroico,” a translation of the “Divine Comedy” into Latin language. It is said, in the Florence edition of Dante’s works published in 1830, to be “reputed faithful and elegant,” but Antonio Catellacci, in the preface to his own Latin version of the “Inferno,” published in 1819, accuses it of being a free paraphrase, too distant both from the meaning and the expression of the original. A few of the severest passages against the Roman Curia are omitted, but D’Aquino could not obtain free permission to publish it in that city, in which no edition of Dante had till then appeared. It was nevertheless printed at Rome by Bernabò Rocco, and with the sanction of the master of the sacred palace, but bore on its title-page the imprint of Naples. The Latin was accompanied with the original text, as had also been the case with a little work of the Similes of Dante translated, which was published as a preliminary specimen.

The remainder of D’Aquino’s works are dictionaries. They are:

- “Lexicon Militare,” two vols, folio, Rome, 1724, with an octavo volume of additions, Rome, 1727;
- “Vocabularium Architecturæ Ædificatoriæ,” Rome, 1735;
- “Nomenclator Agriculturæ,” Rome, 1736.

The “Lexicon Militare” is learned, but so overloaded with irrelevant matter that it has been said one volume out of the three would fully contain all that really relates to the subject. It abounds with quotations from Ariosto, Tasso, Boiardo, Pulci, and even Petrarch; but the statement copied by Mazzucchelli from the “Histoire Litteraire d’Europe” that these are accompanied with Latin translations by D’Aquino is incorrect. The “Vocabularium Architecturæ” is favourably noticed by Angelo Comolli, and that and the “Nomenclator Agriculturæ” appear to be comparatively free from extraneous learning.

== Bibliography ==
- The Biographical Dictionary of the Society for the Diffusion of Useful Knowledge. Vol. 3. Longman, Brown, Green, and Longmans. 1843. pp. 223–224.
- Mazzucchelli, Giammaria (1753). Scrittori d'Italia. Vol. I, 2. Brescia. pp. 910–911.
- D'Afflitto, Eustachio (1782). Memorie degli scrittori del Regno di Napoli. Vol. I. Naples. pp. 401–403.
- Comolli, Angelo (1788). Bibliografia dell'Architettura Civile. Vol. I. Rome. pp. 112–114.
- Sommervogel, Carlos (1890). Bibliothèque de la Compagnie de Jésus. Vol. I. Paris. pp. 492–499.
- Chiti, Paolo (1960). "Un insigne latinista ammiratore e traduttore di Dante: il p. Carlo d'Aquino". La Civiltà Cattolica. CXI: 250–263.
- Asor-Rosa, Alberto (1961). "AQUINO, Carlo d'". Dizionario Biografico degli Italiani (in Italian). Vol. 3: Ammirato–Arcoleo. Rome: Istituto dell'Enciclopedia Italiana. OCLC 883370.
- Goffis, Cesare Federico (1970). "Aquino, Carlo d'". Enciclopedia Dantesca. Istituto dell'Enciclopedia Italiana.
- Sowell, Madison U. (1979). "Carlo D'Aquino: First Compiler of the Commedia's Similes". Italica. 56 (4): 384–393. doi:10.2307/478666. JSTOR 478666.
