= Emma Dillon =

British musicologist

Emma Dillon is a British musicologist currently serving as Thurston Dart Professor of Music at King's College London. Her main research interest is medieval music.

== Early life and education ==
Dillon read music at the University of Oxford, graduating with a BA in 1992. She was subsequently awarded a DPhil in 1998.

== Academic career ==
Dillon became a lecturer in music at the University of Bristol in 1998, before moving to the University of Pennsylvania in 2000 as an assistant professor. While at Penn, she was promoted to full professor, eventually becoming chair of the department.

In 2013, Dillon returned to the UK to join the music department at King's College London. In 2025, she became the Thurston Dart Professor of Music, succeeding Roger Parker.

Dillon has held visiting professorships at UC Berkeley and Corpus Christi College Cambridge, and is a visiting member of the Institute for Advanced Study, working with the School of Historical Studies.

== Awards and recognition ==
In 2026, Dillon was appointed the Christoph Wolff Distinguished Visiting Scholar at Harvard University. She has also been a visiting scholar at Corpus Christi College, Cambridge, to which she returned in 2022 to curate an exhibition of the Parker Library. In 2024, Dillon delivered the Oxford Seminar in Music Theory and Analysis, on the topic of French songs of the 12th and 13th centuries.
