= Thurston Dart Professor of Music =

The Thurston Dart Professorship of Music at King's College London was established in 1996 or 1997. The first holder of the chair was Laurence Dreyfus, who had been Professor of Performance Studies in Music at King's College since 1992; his chair was titled the Thurston Dart Professorship in Performance Studies in Music. The chair in named in honour of Thurston Dart (1921–1971), who was King Edward Professor of Music at the University of London, based at King's College.

== List of Thurston Dart Professors of Music ==
- 1996/7–2005: Laurence Dreyfus, FBA.
- 2007–2020/21: Roger Parker, FBA.
- 2024-Present: Emma Dillon.
