= Bruce Mitchell (scholar) =

Australian scholar (1920–2010)

Raymond Bruce Mitchell (8 January 1920 – 30 January 2010) was a scholar of Old English.

== Biography ==
=== Early life, Australia ===
Mitchell was born in Lismore, New South Wales. He won a free place at the University of Melbourne but was unable to take it up and instead after leaving school at 15, worked as a student teacher while studying part-time. He earned a general Arts degree.

He was commissioned as a lieutenant in 1940 and served as an intelligence officer in the Australian Imperial Force from 1941 to 1946. He then ran a printing company before returning to the university, again part-time while working as a gardener, builders' labourer and railway porter, and tutoring English at the university. He took Firsts in English Language and Literature in 1948 and in Comparative Philology in 1952.

=== Scholarly career, Oxford ===
He entered Merton College, Oxford, on a scholarship in 1952, the same year he married Mollie Miller, who had accompanied him from Australia. They received permission to be married from Mitchell's supervisor, J. R. R. Tolkien. He received a doctorate in 1959 with a thesis entitled Subordinate Clauses in Old English Poetry. In 1986 he gained the degree of D.Litt. (Oxon) for his contribution to Old English studies.

Mitchell was a Fellow and a Tutor at St Edmund Hall, Oxford from 1954 to 1987, and after retirement was elected an emeritus fellow.

Though he spent his entire life in Oxford since age 32, he never lost his Australian accent, and displayed his heritage by having an Australian flag and a eucalyptus tree in his garden.

His specialty was Old English language and literature and particularly Beowulf; his textbooks on Old English language are considered classics in the field, as is his edition of Beowulf, which he published with Fred C. Robinson. His "magisterial" and "phenomenal" book on Old English syntax is still the standard reference work in the field.

Mitchell was Terry Jones's tutor and believed he was the inspiration for Monty Python's "Bruces" sketch; he was disappointed to find out Eric Idle had written it and it was not based on him.

== Bibliography ==
=== Works authored ===
- Mitchell, Bruce; Fred C. Robinson (2007). A Guide to Old English (7 ed.). Oxford, Malden: Wiley-Blackwell. ISBN 978-1-4051-4690-6.
  - 8th edition, 2012, Wiley-Blackwell. (The 1st (1964) and 2nd (1968) editions were written by Mitchell alone – later editions, from 1982 onward, were co-authored by Mitchell and Robinson. Mitchell contributed to the 7th edition but the 8th edition was done after his death.)
- Mitchell, Bruce (1985). Old English Syntax, Vol. 1: Concord, the parts of speech, and the sentence. Oxford: Clarendon. ISBN 978-0-19-811935-7.
- Mitchell, Bruce (1985). Old English Syntax Vol. 2: Subordination, independent elements, and element order. Oxford: Clarendon. ISBN 978-0-19-811944-9.
- Mitchell, Bruce (1988). On Old English: Selected Papers. Oxford: Basil Blackwell. ISBN 0-631-15872-3.
- Mitchell, Bruce (1995). An Invitation to Old English and Anglo-Saxon England. Oxford, Malden: Wiley-Blackwell. ISBN 978-0-631-17436-3.
- Mitchell, Bruce; Fred C. Robinsion; Leslie Webster (1998). Beowulf: An Edition with Relevant Shorter Texts. Oxford, Malden: Blackwell. ISBN 978-0-631-17226-0. (first published 1998)

=== Festschrift ===
Walmsley, John (2006). Inside Old English: Essays in Honour of Bruce Mitchell. Oxford, Malden: Wiley-Blackwell. p. 19. ISBN 978-1-4051-1483-7.
