= Dante Della Terza =

Italian academic (1924–2021)

Dante Della Terza (Italy, 5 May 1924 – 6 April 2021) was an Italian academic living and working in the United States.

== Biography ==
He studied at the Scuola Normale Superiore in Pisa, Italy, under the supervision of Luigi Russo, a major critic between the 1930s and the 1960s. After studying philology in Zurich and teaching in Italy for some time, Della Terza moved to Los Angeles, where he started teaching Italian at the University of California Los Angeles. In the early 60's he moved to Harvard University, where he was Professor of Romance Languages and the Irving Babbitt Professor of Comparative Literatures until Fall 1993. His supervision was fundamental for many American scholars in Italian literature. Among his most important students are: Lucienne Kroha, formerly of McGill University; William Cole, a scholar of art connoisseurship and an art dealer in Barcelona; Luigi Fontanella, formerly of SUNY Stony Brook; Manuela Bertone, formerly of Harvard University and now of the Université Côte d'Azur; Deborah Parker, of the University of Virginia; Anthony Oldcorn, formerly of Brown University; the late Robert Dombroski, of the Graduate Center at the City University of New York; the late Amilcare Jannucci, of the University of Toronto; Madison Sowell, formerly of Brigham Young University and now Provost at Southern Virginia University; and the late Nuccio Ordine. After his time at Harvard, he taught for a few years at the University of Naples "Federico II."

Dante Della Terza's most important work was focused on Dante Alighieri (he was the founder of the international journal Dante), and on the Italian renaissance (especially Torquato Tasso), but he also wrote extensively on post-World War II Italian literature, culture, and literary criticism. Della Terza was essentially a historicist, but his work often branches into different theoretical perspectives, often addressing the relationship between the text and the reader. Besides literature, Della Terza also wrote about the diaspora of European intellectuals in the United States after World War II.

== Bibliography ==
- Forma e memoria. Saggi e ricerche sulla tradizione letteraria da Dante a Vico (Roma 1979);
- Da Vienna a Baltimora. La diaspora degli intellettuali europei negli Stati Uniti d’America (Roma 1987):
- Tradizione ed esegesi. Semantica dell’innovazione da Agostino a De Sanctis (Padova 1987);
- Letteratura e critica tra Otto e Novecento: itinerari di ricezione (Cosenza 1989);
- Pasolini in periferia (Cosenza 1992);
- Strutture poetiche, esperienze letterarie. Percorsi culturali da Dante ai contemporanei (Napoli 1995)
- Tradizione e cultura letteraria nello «Zibaldone». Classici italiani, memorie di testi stranieri (Firenze 2001);
- Saggi su Giacomo Leopardi (Roma 2005).
