= Michael W. Twomey =

Michael W. Twomey is an American medievalist.

Twomey earned his doctorate at Cornell University in 1979. He later joined the Ithaca College faculty, where he held the Charles A. Dana Professorship of Humanities and Arts. Upon retirement, he was granted emeritus status.

== Selected publications ==
- Kaske, Robert E.; Groos, Arthur & Twomey, Michael W. (1988). Leyerle, John (ed.). Medieval Christian Literary Imagery: A Guide to Interpretation. Toronto Medieval Bibliographies. Vol. 11. Toronto: University of Toronto Press. ISBN 0-8020-2636-2. JSTOR 10.3138/j.ctt2tv0pq.
