= Leslie Webster (art historian) =

English museum curator and art historian (born 1943)

Leslie Webster FSA
- Born: 8 November 1943 (age 82)

Academic background
- Education: Westfield College, University of London

Academic work
- Discipline: Art historian and curator
- Sub-discipline: Early Middle Ages; Anglo-Saxons; Vikings
- Institutions: British Museum

Leslie Elizabeth Webster, FSA (born 8 November 1943) is an English retired museum curator and art historian of Anglo-Saxon and Viking art. She worked from 1964 until 2007 at the British Museum, rising to Keeper, where she curated several major exhibitions, and published many works, on the Anglo-Saxons and Early Middle Ages.

== Early life and education ==
Leslie Elizabeth Webster was born on 8 November 1943 to James Lancelot Dobson and Elizabeth Marjorie Dobson (née Dickenson). After attending Central Newcastle High School she matriculated at Westfield College at the University of London, where in 1964 she received a Bachelor of Arts with first class honours.

== Career ==
Following her graduation from Westfield, Webster began work at the British Museum, serving from 1964 to 1969 as assistant keeper of the Department of British and Medieval Antiquities. In 1969 the department was split in two and Webster moved to the newly-structured Department of Medieval and Later Antiquities (in 2000 renamed the Department of Medieval and Modern Europe), serving as assistant keeper until 1985, from then until 2002 as deputy keeper, and during 2002–2003 as the acting keeper. The departments were merged back into one body in 2002, the Department of Prehistory and Europe, of which Webster served as Keeper from 2003 until her 2007 retirement.

During her time at the British Museum, Webster was the co-curator for four major exhibitions about the Early Middle Ages. As part of the Transformation of the Roman World AD 400–900 project of the European Science Foundation, she also coordinated exhibitions in five major European museums.

Webster's work, both before and after retirement, has also included the publication of works on Anglo-Saxon art and archaeology. These include The Golden Age of Anglo-Saxon Art, 966-1066 (1984), The Making of England: Anglo-Saxon Art and Culture AD 600–900 (1991, The Transformation of the Roman World AD 400–900 (1997), Anglo-Saxon Art: A New History (2012), and The Franks Casket (2012). She is the co-author of a forthcoming work on the finds from the Staffordshire Hoard.

== Other activities ==
Webster has served since 2002 as an honorary visiting professor at the Institute of Archaeology at University College London, and on the advisory panel of the National Heritage Memorial Fund since 2012. From 2011 to 2014 she chaired the research advisory panel of the Staffordshire Hoard Research Project, and from 2013 to 2017 she was a member of the Reviewing Committee on the Export of Works of Art and Objects of Cultural Interest. She was the president of the Society for Medieval Archaeology from 2007 to 2010, and the vice president of the Royal Archaeological Institute from 2007 until 2012. She has also served as a trustee for the Society of Antiquaries of London, an organisation of which she was elected a fellow in 1973, in addition to memberships on the English Heritage Museums and Archives Advisory Panel, and the British Academy Corpus of Anglo-Saxon Stone Sculpture Committee. From 1986 to 1999 she served as the UK representative for the Koordinierend Ausschuss der Internationalen Arbeitsgemeinschaft für Sachsenforschung.

== Personal life ==
Webster married William Ian Webster in 1966. She has one son, and two daughters. Who's Who describes her interests as "books, music, walking, cooking, France, whistling".

== Publications ==
- Backhouse, Janet; Turner, Derek H. & Webster, Leslie, eds. (1984). The Golden Age of Anglo-Saxon Art, 966–1066. London: British Museum Publications. ISBN 978-0-7141-0532-1.
- Webster, Leslie & Backhouse, Janet, eds. (1991). The Making of England: Anglo-Saxon Art and Culture, AD 600–900. Toronto: British Museum Press. ISBN 0-7141-0555-4.
- Webster, Leslie & Meadows, Ian (July–August 1997). "Discovery of Anglo-Saxon Helmet helmet with Boar Crest". Minerva. 8 (4): 3–5.
- Webster, Leslie (1998). "Archaeology and Beowulf". In Mitchell, Bruce & Robinson, Fred C. (eds.). Beowulf: An Edition with Relevant Shorter Texts. Oxford: Blackwell. pp. 183–194. ISBN 0-631-17225-4.
  - Republished as Webster, Leslie (2002). "Archaeology and Beowulf". In Donoghue, Daniel (ed.). Beowulf: A Verse Translation: Authoritative Texts, Contexts, Criticism. Translated by Heaney, Seamus. New York: W. W. Norton. pp. 212–223. ISBN 0-393-97580-0.
- Webster, Leslie (2012). The Franks Casket. Objects in Focus. London: British Museum Press. ISBN 978-0-7141-2818-4.
- Webster, Leslie (2012). Anglo-Saxon Art: A New History. London: British Museum Press. ISBN 978-0-7141-2809-2.

== Bibliography ==
- "Appendix C: Membership of the Reviewing Committee on the Export of Works of Art and Objects of Cultural Interest during 2012/13". Export of Objects of Cultural Interest: 2012/13 (PDF). London: Department for Culture, Media and Sport. February 2014. pp. 72–74. ISBN 978-0-10-856005-7.
- Bowring, Joanna (2012). Turquet, Josephine (ed.). Chronology of Temporary Exhibitions at the British Museum (PDF). British Museum Research Publications. Vol. 189. London: The British Museum. ISBN 978-0-86159-189-3.
- Wilson, David M. (2002). The British Museum: A History. London: British Museum Press. ISBN 0-7141-2764-7.
