= Fred C. Robinson =

American academic (1930–2016)

Fred Colson Robinson (23 September 1930, Birmingham, Alabama – 5 May 2016, New Haven, Connecticut) was an American historian at Yale University. He was widely considered one of the world's foremost authorities on Old English.

== Biography ==
Robinson received his bachelor's degree in English and fine arts from Birmingham–Southern College in 1953 and his M.A. and Ph.D. in English and comparative linguistics from the University of North Carolina at Chapel Hill. His 1961 doctoral dissertation was titled "Variation: A Study in the Diction of 'Beowulf'". After teaching at Stanford University and at Cornell University, he joined the Yale faculty in 1972 and eventually retired there as professor emeritus.

He was a Guggenheim Fellow for the academic year 1974–1975. In 1984 he shared the Haskins Medal with Stanley B. Greenfield for their 1980 book A Bibliography of Publications on Old English Literature to the End of 1972. Robinson was the president of the Medieval Academy of America in 1984. In 1996 he delivered the British Academy's Sir Israel Gollancz Memorial Lecture.

Upon his death Robinson was survived by his widow, two children, and four grandchildren.

== Bibliography ==
=== Works ===
- with Bruce Mitchell: (1982) A Guide to Old English, 3rd edition, University of Toronto Press;
  - 8th edition, 2012, Wiley-Blackwell. (The 1st (1964) and 2nd (1968) editions were written by Bruce Mitchell alone — later editions, from 1982 onward, were co-authored by Mitchell and Robinson. Mitchell contributed to the 7th edition but the 8th edition was done after his death.)
- (1970) Old English Literature: A Select Bibliography.
- (1980) A Bibliography of Publications on Old English Literature to the End of 1972 (with Stanley B. Greenfield)
- (1985)‘Beowulf’ and the Appositive Style
- (1991) Old English Verse Texts from Many Sources (editor, with E.G. Stanley)
- (1993) The Tomb of Beowulf
- (1994) The Editing of Old English
- (1998) Beowulf: An Edition with Relevant Shorter Texts, Blackwell (editor, with Bruce Mitchell, Fred C. Robinson, Leslie Webster)

=== Selected articles ===
- ‘The American Element in "Beowulf,"” in English studies vol. 49 (1968) p. 508-516.
- The Aesthetics of “Cædmon's Hymn," in Essays on Aesthetics and Medieval Literature in Honor of Howell Chickering, 2014.

=== Festschrift ===
- Baker, Peter and Nicholas Howe. Words and Works: Studies in Medieval English Language and Literature in Honor of Fred C. Robinson. Toronto: University of Toronto Press, 1998
