= Stanley B. Greenfield =

American Anglo-Saxon scholar (1922–1987)

- Born: 1922; Brooklyn, New York, U.S.
- Died: July 30, 1987 (aged 65)

Stanley Brian Greenfield (1922–1987) was an American Anglo-Saxonist. He was a founder of the International Society of Anglo-Saxonists and professor at the University of Oregon. He wrote not only on Anglo-Saxon themes but also later English literature. His 1967, Grammar and meaning in poetry was awarded the 1968 William Riley Parker Prize. Commenting on his work Brown (1987) notes Greenfield's insistence, when looking at Anglo-Saxon texts, on "the necessity of going back again and again to the text as source for interpretative strength."

Greenfield was born Brooklyn and attended Cornell University during his undergraduate degree. He served in the United States Army in World War II between 1942 and 1946. He received his master's and doctoral degree from the University of California. Between 1950 and 1954, Greenfield taught at the University of Wisconsin, with the following five years spent at Queens College.

== Festschrift ==
- Rugg Brown, Phylis, Georgia Ronan Crampton, and Fred C. Robinson (1986) Modes of Interpretations in Old English Literature: Essays in Honour of Stanley B. Greenfield, University of Toronto Press.

== Selected works ==
- (1955) The Formulaic Expression of the Theme of" Exile" in Anglo-Saxon Poetry. Speculum, 30(2), 200-206.
- (1967) Grammar and Meaning in Poetry. Publications of the Modern Language Association of America, 377-387.
- (1972) The Interpretation of Old English Poems. Routledge Kegan & Paul.
- (1989) Hero and Exile: Art of Old English Poetry. Bloomsbury.
- (1996) A New Critical History of Old English Literature, with Daniel G. Calder. NYU Press.
