= Arthur Groos =

American Germanist

Arthur B. Groos (born 5 February 1943 in Fullerton, California) is an American philologist, musicologist, medievalist and Germanist.

Groos began teaching at Cornell University in 1973, held the Avalon Foundation Professorship in Humanities, and was granted emeritus status upon retirement. He was co-editor of the Cambridge Opera Journal alongside Roger Parker. A Festschrift was published in Groos's honor in 2020.

== Selected publications ==
- Groos, Arthur. Romancing the Grail: Genre, Science, and Quest in Wolfram's "Parzival." New York: Cornell University, 1995.
- Kaske, Robert E.; Groos, Arthur & Twomey, Michael W. (1988). Leyerle, John (ed.). Medieval Christian Literary Imagery: A Guide to Interpretation. Toronto Medieval Bibliographies. Vol. 11. Toronto: University of Toronto Press. ISBN 0-8020-2636-2. JSTOR 10.3138/j.ctt2tv0pq.
