= Roger Parker =

English musicologist

Roger Parker (born London United Kingdom, 2 August 1951) is an English musicologist who was previously Thurston Dart Professor of Music at King's College London. His work has centred on opera. Between 2006 and 2010, while Professor of Music at Gresham College, London, Parker presented four series of free public lectures, one example being "Verdi and Milan" in 2007 which is available on video.

In addition to teaching, Parker has been active as joint editor in the preparation of critical editions of the work of 19th-century Italian composer Gaetano Donizetti for the Milan publishing house Ricordi. He also acts as Repertory Consultant to the UK's specialised recording company, Opera Rara, which has commissioned performances and recordings of rare Donizetti operas such as Belisario in 2012 and Les Martyrs in 2014. Additionally, Parker has presented talks on UK radio on aspects of opera, including his talk "Verdi 200: Viva Verdi" on BBC Radio 3 on 6 January and 13 October 2013.

== Education and academic work ==
He studied at the University of London, first at Goldsmiths' College, and then at King's College London from which he obtained his PhD in 1981. In 1982, he moved to Cornell University in upstate New York, where he was assistant professor and then associate professor. Returning to England to become a lecturer in music (later professor) and fellow of St Hugh's College, Oxford, in 1999 he became professor of music at Cambridge University, where he was a fellow of St John's College. Between 2005 and 2006, he was the chair of the School of Arts and Humanities. Parker became the Visiting Ernest Bloch Lecturer at the University of California, Berkeley in 2002 and, in 2007, he was a visiting scholar at the Institute for Advanced Study in Princeton.

== Preparation of critical editions of operas ==
Roger Parker's focus has been in the area of Italian opera of the nineteenth century. For ten years he was founding co-editor (with Arthur Groos) of the Cambridge Opera Journal, and he continues as General Editor of The Critical Edition of the Operas of Gaetano Donizetti published it Italy by Casa Ricordi of Milan and in the United States by the University of Chicago Press under the auspices of the Fondazione Donizetti. His co-editor is Gabriele Dotto, who led Ricordi's editorial department from 1992 to 2001.

Other critical editions of Donizetti's operas on which Parker has worked include Linda di Chamounix in 2007 as well as those titles which appear on the Donizetti Society's list of works completed by Parker alone, such as Lucrezia Borgia (1998) and Adelia. Additionally, along with Dotto, he has co-authored the critical edition of Lucia di Lammermoor which was presented at the Royal Opera House, London in 2003. Roger Parker is also credited as editor of the critical edition of Puccini's opera, Manon Lescaut published by Ricordi in 2013.

A major revival of a never-completed Donizetti opera, Le duc d'Albe, was given in 2012 by the Vlaamse Opera from a critical edition prepared by Parker. He has written about the work involved in its preparation.

== Involvement with performances ==
For the preparation, recording, and presentation of the Opera Rara recording of Donizetti's Belisario in 2012, it has been noted that the opera was "performed in the edition by Sir Mark Elder, Roger Parker and Jürgen Selk, based on the 2010 edition by Ottavio Sbragia." For that event, Parker coordinated and presented an afternoon-long public symposium on the opera. In a similar fashion, when Donizetti's Les Martyrs was presented by the Orchestra of the Age of Enlightenment in London in November 2014, Roger Parker was part of an introductory panel which also included Dr Flora Willson (who prepared the critical edition) and author and Donizetti biographer Jonathan Keates.

== Awards and appointments ==
He received the "Premio Giuseppe Verdi" in 1986, was a Guggenheim Fellow in 1986–87, and in 1991 was awarded the Dent Medal of the Royal Musical Association. 2008 saw his election as Fellow of the British Academy, while, in 2014, he was appointed member of the Royal Swedish Academy of Music.

== Recent publications ==
- "Verdi the revolutionary? Let's separate fact from fiction", The Guardian (London), 7 October 2013
- Giacomo Puccini, Manon Lescaut, Milan: Ricordi, 2013. Editor, critical edition.
- A History of Opera (with Carolyn Abbate), London: Penguin Books, Ltd.; New York: W.W. Norton and Company, Inc., 2012
- The New Grove Guide to Verdi and his Operas, Oxford and New York: Oxford University Press, 2007
- Remaking the Song: Operatic Visions and Revisions from Handel to Berio, Berkeley & Los Angeles: University of California Press, 2006
- "The Opera Industry", in Jim Samson, ed., The Cambridge History of Nineteenth-Century Music, Cambridge: Cambridge University Press, 2002, pp. 87–117
- "Philippe and Posa Act II: The Shock of the New", Cambridge Opera Journal, 14/1-2 (2002), pp. 133–47
- Gaetano Donizetti, Le convenienze ed inconvenienze teatrali, in Le opere di Gaetano Donizetti. Milan: Ricordi, 2002; vocal score, 2003. Joint editor of the critical edition with Anders Wiklund.
- Pensieri per un maestro: Studi in onore di Pierluigi Petrobelli, Turin: Einaudi, 2002. Joint editor with Stefano La Via

== Personal life ==
Married to concert cellist Lynden Cranham, has three children and eight grandchildren.

== See also ==
Musicologist Philip Gossett (General Editor of critical editions of Giuseppe Verdi and Gioachino Rossini's operas.)
