= Madison U. Sowell =

American academic and Mormon missionary

Madison U. Sowell was appointed provost and vice president of academic affairs at Tusculum University in June 2018.

== Early life, education, and vita ==
Sowell was born and reared in Piggott, Arkansas, where he still owns and maintains family cotton and soybean farms. He joined the Church of Jesus Christ of Latter-day Saints (LDS Church) when he was 17, shortly before beginning his undergraduate studies in the prestigious Brigham Young University Honors Program, entering in the same cohort as Clayton Christensen, who later developed the theory of "disruptive innovation." Sowell then served a mission in the Italy North Mission.

Sowell earned a bachelor's degree summa cum laude from BYU (with Highest Honors from the Honors Program) and a master's degree and Ph.D. in Romance Languages and Literatures from Harvard University, where he won the Jacoby Prize for scholarship and his department's travel-study prize for outstanding teaching. At Harvard he studied Italian literature with Dante Della Terza (a pupil of Luigi Russo), Italian Renaissance history with the historian Felix Gilbert, and epic poetry with the celebrated translator Robert Fitzgerald.

Sowell has written over 150 articles, book reviews, editorials, and essays primarily related to Dante and Italian literature. His illustrated books Il Balletto Romantico: Tesori della Collezione Sowell (Palermo: L'Epos, 2007) and Icônes du ballet romantique: Marie Taglioni et sa famille (Rome: Gremese, 2016) were co-authored with his wife Debra H. Sowell, a dance historian and Southern Virginia University professor emerita of humanities. His latest single-authored book, Disdéri's Dancers and Carte-de-Visite Ballet Photography in the French Second Empire (Benevento: Edizioni Kinetès, 2023), was formally presented at the Università degli Studi di Napoli Federico II and the Accademia Nazionale di Danza in Rome in December 2023. The story of the writing of the book was published in the Giornale di Kinetès. He also served as an editor of the Journal of the Rocky Mountain Medieval and Renaissance Association.

In early 2009, Sowell was appointed a member of the board of trustees of Southern Virginia University, where he lectured on Dante and medieval and Renaissance art and participated in the Executive Lecture series. On July 29, 2010, he was appointed Interim Provost at SVU. On April 12, 2011, he became the provost at Southern Virginia. The provost reports to and works closely with the president, is the chief academic officer and leads the university's academic areas and faculty. After six years of full-time service, he was granted a sabbatical leave in Fall 2016 to work on several writing projects.

Sowell served from 1998 to 2001 as president of the Italy Milan Mission. He has also served as an LDS high councilor, bishop, a Missionary Training Center branch president, a ward Young Men's president, a counselor in the West Virginia Charleston Mission presidency, and church organist.

== Administrative and scholarly career ==
Sowell served as a trustee, interim provost, and provost at Southern Virginia University, a liberal arts college located in southwestern Virginia. He was awarded the 2018-2019 Howard D. Rothschild Fellowship for research at Harvard University's Houghton Library. He is a former trustee of the First Freedom Center, whose mission is to advance the human rights of freedom of religion and freedom of conscience.

A professor emeritus of Italian and comparative literature at Brigham Young University (BYU), he taught and served as the chair of BYU's department of French and Italian for three terms (1989-1998), an Alcuin Fellow, a Karl G. Maeser General Education Professor, the Scheuber and Veinz Professor of Humanities and Languages, and the director of the BYU Honors Program and an associate dean of undergraduate education (2006-2009). He is a specialist in the epic tradition of Italian literature from Dante to Tasso and the author and editor of several books, including Dante and Ovid: Essays in Intertextuality and a translation of The Cabala of Pegasus by Giordano Bruno (Yale University Press). He has also served as the organizer of various library and museum exhibits of rare dance books and prints. He and his wife are among the foremost collectors of pre-1870 dance prints in the world.

== Sources ==
- Madison U. Sowell at the MLCA Database
