= Journal of English and Germanic Philology =

- Discipline: Medieval English, Germanic and Celtic cultures
- Language: English, sometimes German
- Edited by: Renée R. Trilling, Kirsten Wolf, Robert J. Meyer-Lee

Publication details
- History: 1897-present
- Publisher: University of Illinois Press (United States)
- Frequency: Quarterly

Standard abbreviations
- ISO 4: J. Engl. Ger. Philol.

Indexing
- ISSN: 0363-6941 (print); 1945-662X (web)
- LCCN: 10026331
- JSTOR: 03636941
- OCLC no.: 22518525

Links
- Journal homepage

The Journal of English and Germanic Philology is a quarterly peer-reviewed academic journal of medieval studies that was established in 1897 and is now published by University of Illinois Press. Its focus is on the cultures of English, Germanic, and Celtic-speaking parts of medieval northern Europe. Previous editors-in-chief include Albert S. Cook, George T. Flom and Ernst Alfred Philippson.
