= ELH =

Academic journal

- Discipline: Literature
- Language: English
- Edited by: Nan Da

Publication details
- History: 1934-present
- Publisher: Johns Hopkins University Press (United States)
- Frequency: Quarterly

Standard abbreviations
- ISO 4: ELH

Indexing
- ISSN: 0013-8304 (print); 1080-6547 (web)
- LCCN: 35012114
- JSTOR: 00138304
- OCLC no.: 1567158

Links
- Journal homepage; Online access

ELH (English Literary History) is an academic journal established in 1934 at Johns Hopkins University, devoted to the study of major works in the English language, particularly British literature. It covers developments in literature through historical, critical, and theoretical methods. The current senior editor is Nan Da.

== Overview ==
ELH self-describes as

welcom[ing] sophisticated, groundbreaking essays on all literatures in English and on cultural forms and contexts related to those literatures. Continuing a tradition that stretches back to 1934, the journal's editors balance historical, critical, and theoretical concerns in seeking to publish the very best work on English-language writing from its beginnings to the present day.

Submissions are received year-round. Authors are asked that manuscripts submitted for review be "in Word (.doc or .docx) format," "in accordance with The Chicago Manual of Style, 16th ed.," and "double-spaced, with one-inch margins, in Times New Roman, 12 pt. font." The word count for manuscripts is between 8,000 and 12,000 words, including endnotes.

Below is the Table of Contents from the Summer 2020 issue:

- From the English Institute—
  - An "Introduction to the English Institute Essays on 'Truth-Telling'" by Sangeeta Ray and Ian Balfour
  - Zahid R. Chaudhary on "The Politics of Exposure: Truth After Post-Facts"
  - Jennifer Doyle on "Alethurgy's Shadows: Truth-Telling Between Women in Elena Ferrante's Neapolitan Novels"
  - David Kurnick on "A Few Lies: Queer Theory and Our Method Melodramas"
  - Joanna Picciotto on "Truth-Telling, Mass Media, and The Poet's Office"
- Katherine Walker on "Clowns and Demonic Learning in Doctor Faustus"
- Ross Lerner on "The Astonied Body in Paradise Lost"
- Andrew Lawson on "Becoming Bourgeois: Benjamin Franklin's Account of the Self"
- David A. P. Womble on "What Climate Did to Consent, 1748–1818"
- Lily Gurton-Wachter on "Blake's "Little Black Thing": Happiness and Injury in the Age of Slavery"

and

- Peter Howarth on "Marianne Moore's Performances"

Previous editors-in-chief include Jonathan Kramnick (Yale University), Frances Ferguson (University of Chicago), Ronald Paulson (Johns Hopkins University), and Jeanne-Marie Jackson (Johns Hopkins University). The current editorial board is listed online.
