= Modern Language Notes =

- Discipline: Literature
- Language: English, French, German, Italian, Spanish

Publication details
- History: 1886–present
- Publisher: Johns Hopkins University Press (United States)
- Frequency: 5/year
- Open access: Hybrid

Standard abbreviations
- ISO 4: Mod. Lang. Notes

Indexing
- ISSN: 0026-7910 (print); 1080-6598 (web)
- LCCN: 78646692
- JSTOR: 00267910
- OCLC no.: 1201539848

Links
- Journal homepage; Online access at Project MUSE

Modern Language Notes (MLN) is a peer-reviewed academic journal established in 1886 at the Johns Hopkins University, with the intention of introducing continental European literary criticism into American scholarship. The journal is published five times per year, with one issue covering each of the four languages of concern (French, German, Italian, Spanish), while the fifth issue focuses on comparative literature. Each issue has its own specific set of editors.

== Abstracting and indexing ==
The journal is abstracted and indexed in:

- Arts and Humanities Citation Index
- Current Contents/Arts & Humanities
- EBSCO databases
- Index Islamicus
- International Bibliography of Periodical Literature
- Linguistic Bibliography
- Linguistics & Language Behavior Abstracts
- Modern Language Association Database
- ProQuest databases
- Scopus
