= Crux (literary) =

Concept in textual criticism

A crux is a textual passage that is corrupted to the point that it is difficult or impossible to interpret and resolve. Cruxes are studied in palaeography, textual criticism, bibliography, and literary scholarship. A crux is more serious or extensive than a simple slip of the pen or typographical error. The word comes from crux, Latin for "cross", used metaphorically as a difficulty that torments one. Cruxes occur in a wide range of pre-modern (ancient, medieval, and Renaissance) texts, printed and manuscript.

== Shakespearean examples ==
Though widely exposed to readers and scholars, the texts of William Shakespeare's plays yield some of the most famous literary cruxes. Some have been resolved fairly well. In Henry V, II.iii.16-7, the First Folio text has the Hostess describe Falstaff on his death-bed like this:

...his nose was sharp as a pen, and 'a Table of green fields.

Lewis Theobald's editorial correction, "and 'a [he] babbl'd of green fields", has won almost universal acceptance from subsequent editors, although an alternative reading, "... as sharp as a pen on a table of green fields", alluding to gaming tables and accountants' tables, has been proposed. Similarly, the "dram of eale" In Hamlet I, iv, 36 can be sensibly interpreted as "dram of ev'l [evil]", but has also been interpreted as "dram of ale".

Other Shakespearean cruxes have not been so successfully resolved. In All's Well That Ends Well, IV.ii, 38-9, Diana observes to Bertram,

I see that men make ropes in such a scarre,
That we'll forsake ourselves.

Editors have reached no consensus on exactly what "ropes in such a scarre" can mean, or how it should be amended: "no satisfactory explanation or emendation has been offered." Perhaps the best alternative that has been proposed is "may rope 's [us] in such a snare." Another unresolved Shakespearean crux is the "runaway's eyes" in Romeo and Juliet, III, ii, 6.

Sometimes a crux will not require emendation, but simply present a knotty problem of comprehension. In Henry IV, Part 1, IV, i, 98-9, Sir Richard Vernon describes Prince Hal and his comrades as appearing:

All plum'd like estridges, that with the wind
bated like eagles having lately bath'd...

This is most likely a reference to some obscure assertion about animal behaviour, but researchers have not yet come to a consensus on the meaning of the text.

== Typographic conventions ==
In editions of Greek and Roman authors, a crux is marked off by obeli, to indicate that the editor is not confident enough either to follow the manuscript reading or to print a conjecture.
