= Oliver Padel =

English medievalist and toponymist

Oliver James Padel (born 31 October 1948 in St Pancras, London, England) is an English medievalist and toponymist specializing in Welsh and Cornish studies. He is currently Honorary Research Fellow in the Department of Anglo-Saxon, Norse, and Celtic in the University of Cambridge, and visiting professor of Celtic at the University of the West of England.

== Biography ==
Padel was born in 1948, the son of John Hunter Padel and his wife Hilda (née Barlow), daughter of Sir Alan Barlow, 2nd Baronet and his wife Nora, (née Darwin), through whom he is a great-great-grandson of Charles Darwin. His older sister is the poet Ruth Padel.

He was educated at University College School, Hampstead, and Peterhouse, Cambridge, whence he graduated with a BA degree in Anglo-Saxon, Norse and Celtic in 1970. He was subsequently awarded an MLitt degree for his thesis on the inscriptions of Pictland by the University of Edinburgh in 1972. In 1992, he took a LittD degree for his work on Cornish place-names.

He was a founding member of staff of the Institute of Cornish Studies (in the Charles Thomas era) from 1972 to 1988. In 1988–90, he had a temporary post in the Department of Anglo-Saxon, Norse and Celtic (ASNaC) at Cambridge University while Patrick Sims-Williams was on research leave, followed by posts in the Department of History and Welsh History at the University of Aberystwyth and at the Cornwall Record Office. In 1994, he was appointed University Lecturer in Celtic Literature in ASNaC, replacing the former incumbent, Patrick Sims-Williams.

Padel was president of the English Place-Name Society, from 2004 to 2014, and is a past president of the Society for Name Studies in Britain and Ireland. He is a member of council of the Devon and Cornwall Record Society, and he edits the Journal of the Royal Institution of Cornwall.

Cornish nationalist John Angarrack criticised Padel for cultural suppression by disregarding Cornish etymology of place-names in an attempt to make a connection to Saxon naming conventions.

== Selected publications ==
=== Linguistic and literary studies ===
- Arthur in Medieval Welsh Literature (Writers of Wales series); Cardiff: University of Wales Press, 2000. ISBN 0-7083-1682-4 (pbk) 0708316891 (hbk)
- Cornish Place-name Elements (English Place-Name Society series; v.56/57); Nottingham: English Place-Name Society, 1985. ISBN 0-904889-11-4 : No price
- A Popular Dictionary of Cornish Place-names; Penzance: A. Hodge, 1988. ISBN 0-906720-15-X

=== Editions, translations and other contributions ===
- A Commodity of Good Names: essays in honour of Margaret Gelling; edited by O. J. Padel and David N. Parsons. Donington, Lincolnshire: Shaun Tyas, 2008. ISBN 978-1-900289-90-0 (hbk.)
- The Cornish Lands of the Arundells of Lanherne, fourteenth to sixteenth centuries / edited by H. S. A. Fox and O. J. Padel. (Devon and Cornwall Record Society. New series; v. 41); Exeter : Devon and Cornwall Record Society, 2000. ISBN 0-901853-41-0 (pbk.)
- The Cornish Writings of the Boson Family. Nicholas, Thomas and John Boson, of Newlyn: circa 1660 to 1730. Edited with translations and notes by O. J. Padel; Redruth: Institute of Cornish Studies, 1975. ISBN 0-903686-09-0
- Domesday Book / text and translation edited by John Morris. 10, Cornwall / edited by Caroline and Frank Thorn from a draft translation prepared by Oliver Padel (History From the Sources series); Chichester : Phillimore, 1979. ISBN 0-85033-156-0 (hbk) ISBN 0850331552 (pbk)
- Gascoyne, Joel A Map of the County of Cornwall, 1699; reprinted in facsimile with an introduction by W. L. D. Ravenhill and O. J. Padel (Devon and Cornwall Record Society: new series; vol. 34.); Exeter : Devon and Cornwall Record Society, 1991.
- Padel, O. J. "Two new pre-conquest charters for Cornwall". Cornish Studies; 6, 1979. pp. 20–27.
- Royal Institution of Cornwall: Exhibition of Manuscripts and Printed Books on the Cornish Language (15th century - 1904). [Compiled by O. J. Padel.]; [Redruth:] Institute of Cornish Studies, 1975. Note: Arranged in association with the 5th International Congress of Celtic Studies, held at Penzance.
- A Medieval Cornish Miscellany / W. M. M. Picken; edited by O. J. Padel; Chichester: Phillimore, 2000. ISBN 1-86077-098-3
- Thomas, Charles A Provisional List of Imported Pottery in Post-Roman Western Britain & Ireland / Charles Thomas; (with an appendix on Tintagel by O. J. Padel) (Special report; no.7); Redruth: Institute of Cornish Studies, 1981. ISBN 0-903686-33-3
