= Anglo-Saxon settlement of Britain =

The settlement of Great Britain by Germanic peoples from continental Europe led to the development of an Anglo-Saxon cultural identity and a shared Germanic language, Old English, whose closest known relative was Old Frisian, spoken on the other side of the North Sea. The first Germanic speakers to settle in Britain permanently are likely to have been soldiers recruited by the Roman administration in Britain in the 4th century or earlier. In the early 5th century, during the end of Roman rule in Britain and the breakdown of the Roman economy, larger numbers arrived, and their influence upon local culture and politics increased.

There is ongoing debate about the scale, timing and nature of the Anglo-Saxon settlements and also about what happened to the existing populations of the regions where the migrants settled. The available evidence includes a small number of medieval texts which emphasise Saxon settlement and violence in the 5th century but do not give many clear or reliable details. Linguistic, archaeological and genetic information have played an increasing role in attempts to better understand what happened. The British Celtic and Latin dialects spoken in Britain in imperial times had very little impact on Old English vocabulary. According to many scholars, this suggests that a large number of Germanic speakers became important relatively suddenly. On the basis of such evidence it has even been argued that large parts of what is now England were cleared of prior inhabitants. A contrasting view that gained support in the late 20th century suggests that the migration involved relatively few individuals, possibly centred on a warrior elite, who popularised a non-Roman identity after the downfall of Roman institutions. This hypothesis suggests a large-scale acculturation of natives to the incomers' language and material culture. In support of this, archaeologists have found that, despite evidence of violent disruption and the profound changes in material culture, settlement patterns and land use show many continuities with the Romano-British past.

A major genetic study in 2022 which used DNA samples from different periods and regions argued that there was significant immigration from the area in or near what is now northwestern Germany, and also that these immigrants intermarried with local Britons. This evidence supports a theory of large-scale migration of both men and women, beginning in the Roman period and continuing until the 8th century. At the same time, the findings of the same study support theories of rapid acculturation, with early medieval individuals of both local, migrant and mixed ancestry being buried near each other in the same new ways. This evidence also indicates that in the early medieval period, and continuing into the modern period, there were large regional variations, with the genetic impact of immigration highest in the east and declining towards the west.

One of the few written accounts of the period is by the monk Gildas, who probably wrote in the early 6th century. His account influenced later works which became more elaborate and detailed but which cannot be relied upon for this early period. Gildas reports that a major conflict was triggered some generations before him, after a group of foreign Saxons was invited to settle in Britain by the Roman leadership in return for defending against raids from the Picts and Scots. These Saxons came into conflict with the local authorities and ransacked the countryside. Gildas reports that after a long war, the Romans recovered control. Peace was restored, but Britain was weaker, being fractured by internal conflict between small kingdoms ruled by "tyrants". Gildas states that there was no further conflict against foreigners in the generations after this specific conflict. No other local written records survive until much later. By the time of Bede, more than a century after Gildas, Anglo-Saxon kingdoms had come to dominate most of what is now modern England. Many modern historians believe that the development of Anglo-Saxon culture and identity, and even its kingdoms, involved local British people and kingdoms as well as Germanic immigrants.

== Background and context ==
A traditional account of Anglo-Saxon immigration has been influential since at least the 8th century, when Bede outlined his reconstruction of what had happened some centuries earlier. While he partly based his work upon earlier records such as the near contemporary Gildas, these gave a very incomplete picture, and he added many details. Modern scholars see several aspects of his expanded account as questionable, while popular and fictional accounts, including even Arthurian legend, have tended to take it for granted.

In the traditional account, there was a single large coordinated invasion of Anglo-Saxons into Britain after the end of Roman rule in 411. This adventus saxonum represented the main immigration event, and this was followed by a period where small, pagan Anglo-Saxon kingdoms in the east fought small Celtic Christian kingdoms in the west, and bit by bit the Anglo-Saxons defeated the Britons and took over the country, and in this way England became English by force. According to this account ethnic Anglo-Saxons and ethnic Britons were from the beginning distinct and separated peoples, conscious of the war between their nations. It was envisioned that Britons living in Anglo-Saxon kingdoms either had to move or convert to a foreign culture.

In contrast, modern scholars generally believe that Germanic speakers started arriving in Britain before the end of Roman rule, probably mainly as soldiers. They may have formed a significant part of Romano-British society at the end of Roman rule, and their culture probably continued to be especially associated with the military. That immigration and conflict involving Germanic speakers increased during the 5th century, after the end of Roman rule, is still widely accepted by scholars, but it is no longer assumed that this necessarily involved the immediate formation of small Anglo-Saxon kingdoms, or a straightforward conflict between two opposed ethnic groups. Although such ethnic kingdoms were known to Bede from his own time, much uncertainty remains about the way in which these kingdoms developed between the time of Gildas and the time of Bede.

=== Continental Roman sources ===
The area of present-day England was part of the Roman province of Britannia from 43 AD. The province seems unlikely ever to have been as deeply integrated into Roman culture as nearby Continental provinces, and from the crisis of the third century Britain was often ruled by Roman usurpers who were in conflict with the central government in Rome, such as Postumus (about 260–269), Carausius (286–293), Magnentius (350–353), Magnus Maximus (383–388) and Constantine III (407–411). From the beginning the central Roman administration, like the later rebel administrations, recruited soldiers for Britain from the Lower Rhine regions in what is now the Netherlands and Northern Germany. This continued into the period when Rome lost direct control of the Lower Rhine to the Franks and Saxons who lived there. Such soldiers are likely to have become more important in Britain during periods when field armies were withdrawn during internal Roman power struggles.

While modern scholars use the term "Anglo-Saxons" to refer to speakers of Old English, the earliest waves to arrive without being in the Roman military were referred to in contemporary Latin sources as "Saxons" (Saxones). This term, which developed new meanings over time, was used by Roman authors starting in the 4th century, who reported that such Saxons had been troubling the coasts of the North Sea and English Channel since the late 3rd century. At this time the term was used for raiders from north of the Frankish tribes who lived near the Rhine delta. Among the earliest such mentions of Saxons, they were named as allies of both Carausius and Magnentius. At some point in the 3rd or 4th century the Romans also established a military commander who was assigned to oversee a chain of coastal forts on each side of the channel; the one on the British side was called the Saxon Shore (Litus Saxonicum). In 368 imperial forces under the command of Count Theodosius defeated Saxons who were apparently based in Britain.

There are very few reliable written records for the 5th century, but what exists is generally understood to indicate a sharp increase of Anglo-Saxon immigration into Britain and the beginnings of Anglo-Saxon rule in some areas. According to the Chronica Gallica of 452, a chronicle written in Gaul, Britain was ravaged by Saxon invaders in 409 or 410. This was during the period when Constantine III was leading British Roman forces in rebellion on the continent. Although the rebellion was eventually quashed, the Romano-British citizens reportedly expelled their Roman officials during this period and never again re-joined the Roman Empire. In the 6th century the Byzantine historian Procopius wrote that, after the overthrow of Constantine III in 411, "the Romans never succeeded in recovering Britain, but it remained from that time under tyrants".

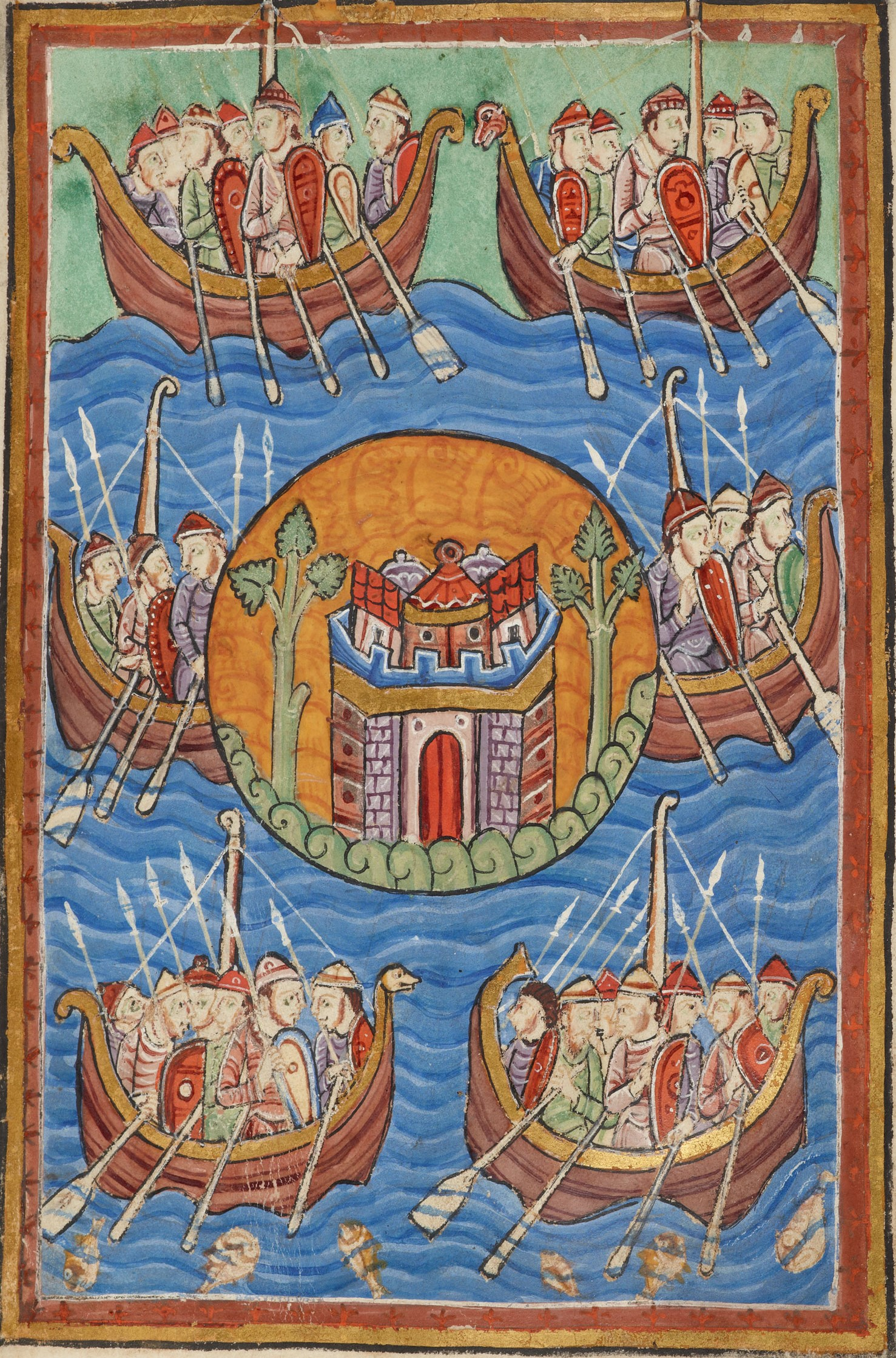
An 1130 depiction of Angles, Saxons and Jutes crossing the sea to Britain equipped with war gear from the Miscellany on the Life of St Edmund

A short work about the Valentinian and Theodosian dynasties, written in the 440s on the continent, claims that Britannia was lost to the empire during the rule of Honorius between 395 and 423. A 5th-century hagiography of Saint Germanus of Auxerre claims that he helped to command a defence against an invasion of Picts and Saxons in 429 while in Britain trying to combat the Pelagian heresy. The Chronica Gallica of 452 reports for the year 441: "The British provinces even at this time have been handed over across a wide area through various catastrophes and events to the rule of the Saxons."

Procopius reported meeting Englishmen who visited Byzantium with Frankish envoys, and hearing accounts of the situation in the 6th century. He heard that the island called Brittia, which was across from the mouth of the Rhine river and north of Spain and Gaul, was settled by three nations, the "Angles, Frisians, and the Britons who share their name with the island" (᾿Αγγίλοι ... Φρίσσονες ... Βρίττωνες), each ruled by its own king. Each nation was so prolific that it sent large numbers of individuals every year to the Franks, who planted them in unpopulated regions of their territory.

Procopius never mentions Saxons or Jutes, and understood instead that the northern neighbours of the Franks were called the Warini (Οὔαρνοι), whose kingdom stretched from the north side of the Rhine mouth to the Danube, to the area south of the Danes. He portrays the Angles and Warini as both being to some extent under the hegemony of their more powerful neighbours the Franks in the time of Theudebert I (ruler Austrasia 533-547).

=== Gildas ===
The earliest text to give an explicit account of settlement in Britain by what it calls "Saxons" (Saxones) is the tract De Excidio et Conquestu Britanniae. Its date of composition is uncertain, plausibly falling between the late 5th and the mid-6th century. Inspired by Old Testament prophetic writing, much of the De excidio chastises political figures contemporary with Gildas for their irreligious behaviour. In Gildas's account, the arrival of the Saxons in Britain was divine punishment for the sinful nature of many British rulers. In the view of modern historians, the most important contributions of this source are what it tells us about Gildas's own time, such as the political and religious environment which he took for granted, or the fact that his high standard of literary Latin indicates that he had access to a classical education.

Nevertheless, the De excidio opens with a short historical sketch, without providing clear dates, of the sins of the Britons and an important phase of "ruin" involving a group of Saxons in the 5th century. It is this passage that has attracted most attention from historians, from the early Middle Ages into the 21st century, and is the basis for the traditional narrative of Saxon settlement. Gildas indicates that the Britons wrote to a powerful Roman leader (romanae potestatis virum) addressed as "Agitius thrice consul", begging for assistance, with no success. This is normally understood to be Aëtius, whose third consulship was in 446, implying a date between 445 and 453, when he died.

Gildas reports that an unnamed Romano-British "proud tyrant" then invited "Saxons" to Britain to help defend it from the Picts and Scots—and engaged them in a Roman-style military treaty in which Saxons served as foederati, rewarded with lands, which Gildas says were initially in the east of Britain, with three ships then followed by a larger number. These Saxons eventually came into conflict with the Romano-British when they were not given sufficient monthly supplies. In reaction to this, they overran the whole country, creating enormous social and economic disruption, and then returned to their "home" (domus).

The British subsequently united under Ambrosius Aurelianus and defeated the Saxons, who had previously been victorious and whose "home" was still in Britain. The historian N. J. Higham has called this ensuing conflict the "War of the Saxon Federates". A period of many battles ensued, culminating in the siege at "Mount Badon", the location of which is no longer known. These battles are generally believed to have all been against the Saxons, though Gildas does not specify this. In any case, Gildas does not mention any ongoing conflict with the Saxons after Badon. In contrast to later narratives that draw upon this section in Gildas, he did not imply that the Saxons he mentioned were the first Saxons, or that their arrival represented the beginning of a migration. Gildas reported that his own time—the generation after the events he describes—"had only experienced the present peace", that wars with outsiders no longer happened, though civil conflicts existed, and cities and parts of the countryside remained uninhabited.

=== Bede ===
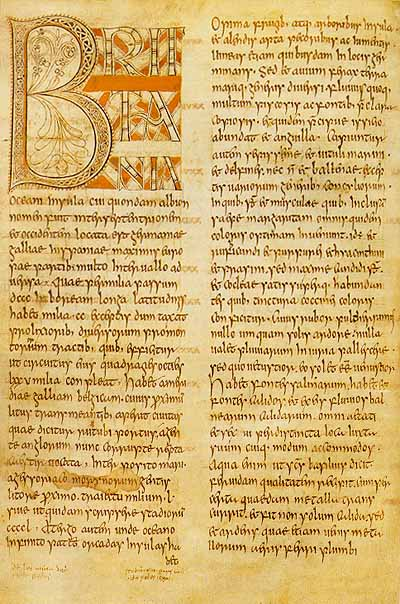
Folio 3v from the Saint Petersburg Bede (National Library of Russia, lat. Q. v. I. 18), a near-contemporary version of the Historia ecclesiastica gentis Anglorum

Gildas's description of a conflict with mercenaries was Bede's main source for what he understood to be a migration of the "Angle or Saxon people" (Latin: Anglorum sive Saxonum gens), but Bede made significant adaptations. Bede is the oldest surviving source to name the "proud tyrant" as Vortigern, but his source for this name is unknown, and Bede may have misunderstood a British title, meaning "high ruler", as a personal name. Although he reports Saint Germanus coming to Britain after this conflict began, he would have been dead by then, according to his understanding of when it happened.

In Bede's semi-mythical account the Saxon mercenaries came in three boats led by two brothers, Hengist and Horsa ("Stallion and Horse"), and Hengist's son Oisc. Some modern scholars have suggested that "Hengist" and Oisc may represent memories of the same person as Ansehis, who was named in the Ravenna Cosmography as the chief of the "Old Saxons" in continental Europe who led his people to Britain. Bede claimed that this family were ancestors of the kings of Kent.

A bigger fleet followed according to him, representing the three most powerful tribes of Germania — the Angles, Saxons and Jutes — and these were eventually followed by terrifying swarms. In a well-known passage, Bede gives a rough description of the homelands of these three peoples and describes the places in Britain where he believed they had settled:

- The Saxons came from what Bede called Old Saxony and settled in Wessex, Sussex and Essex. (Bede also generally used the term "Saxon" as a collective term covering all the earliest Germanic settlers and raiders. Like the Ravenna Cosmography he also used the term "Old Saxons" to distinguish the Saxons of his time who were neighbours of the Franks in Europe.)
- Jutland, the peninsula containing part of what is now modern Denmark, was the homeland of the Jutes who settled in Kent and the Isle of Wight.
- The Angles (or English) were from "Anglia", a country which Bede understood to have been emptied by this migration and which lay between the homelands of the Saxons and Jutes. Anglia is usually interpreted as being near the old Schleswig-Holstein Province (straddling the modern Danish-German border), and containing the modern Angeln. (Bede also used the term English as a collective term for the Anglo-Saxons of his time.)

The naming of these three specific tribes was probably influenced by the semi-mythological genealogical claims of the royal families of Bede's time. However, in another passage Bede clarified that the continental ancestors of the Anglo-Saxons were not really limited to three tribes, or one settlement period. He named pagan peoples still living in Germany (Germania) in the 8th century "from whom the Angles or Saxons, who now inhabit Britain, are known to have derived their origin; for which reason they are still corruptly called "Garmans" by the neighbouring nation of the Britons": the Frisians, the Rugini (possibly from Rügen), the Danes, the "Huns" (Pannonian Avars in this period, whose influence stretched north to Slavic-speaking areas in central Europe), the "old Saxons" (antiqui Saxones), and the "Boructuari" who are presumed to be inhabitants of the old lands of the Bructeri, near the Lippe river.

== Linguistic evidence ==
Kenneth Jackson's map showing British river names of Celtic etymology, thought to be a good indicator of the spread of Old English. Area I, where Celtic names are rare and confined to large and medium-sized rivers, shows English-language dominance to c. 500–550; Area II to c. 600; Area III, where even many small streams have Brittonic names to c. 700. In Area IV, Brittonic remained the dominant language 'till at least the Norman Conquest' and river names are overwhelmingly Celtic.

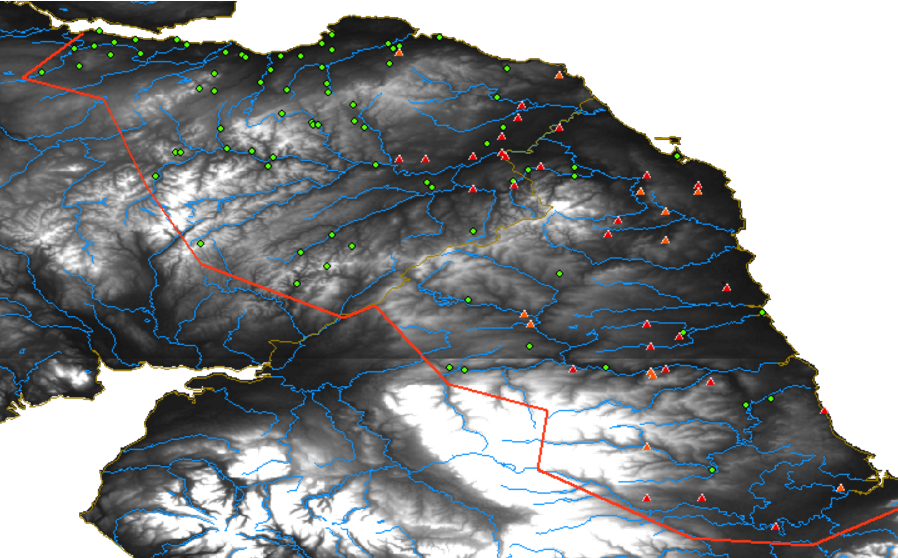
A map of place-names between the Firth of Forth and the River Tees: in green, names likely containing Brittonic elements; in red and orange, names likely containing the Old English elements -ham and -ingaham respectively. Brittonic names lie mostly to the north of the Lammermuir and Moorfoot Hills.

Linguistic evidence from Roman Britain suggests that most inhabitants spoke British Celtic and/or British Latin. However, by the 8th century, when extensive evidence for the post-Roman language situation is next available, it is clear that the dominant language in what is now eastern and southern England was Old English, whose West Germanic predecessors were spoken in what is now the Netherlands and northern Germany. This was in marked contrast to experience in what is now northern France where the West-Germanic speaking Franks adopted the Latin derived languages of the local population. Explaining the rise of Old English, and its continued westward and northward spread, is crucial in any account of the Anglo-Saxon settlement of Britain.

Old English shows little obvious influence from Celtic or spoken Latin: there are for example few English words of Brittonic origin. Moreover, except in Cornwall, the vast majority of place-names in England are easily etymologised as Old English (or Old Norse, due to later Viking influence), demonstrating the dominance of English across post-Roman England. Intensive research in recent decades on Celtic toponymy has shown that more names in England and southern Scotland have Brittonic, or occasionally Latin, etymologies than was once thought, but even so, it is clear that Brittonic and Latin place-names in the eastern half of England are extremely rare, and although they are noticeably more common in the western half, they are still a tiny minority─2% in Cheshire, for example.

The incidence of British Celtic personal names in the royal genealogies of a number of "Anglo-Saxon" dynasties such as those of Wessex, Lindsey and Mercia is very suggestive of Saxonisation at an elite level. The Wessex royal line was traditionally founded by a man named Cerdic, an undoubtedly Celtic name cognate to Ceretic (the name of two British kings, ultimately derived from *Corotīcos). This may indicate that Cerdic was a native Briton and that his dynasty became anglicised over time. A number of Cerdic's alleged descendants also possessed potentially Celtic names, including the 'Bretwalda' Ceawlin. The last man in this dynasty to have a Brittonic name was King Caedwalla, who died as late as 689.

In Mercia, too, several kings bear seemingly Celtic names, most notably Penda. As far east as Lindsey, the Celtic name Caedbaed appears in the list of kings. This is also the case with some bishops, for example four upper-class Northumbrian brothers in the English Church; Chad, Cedd, Cynibil and Caelin with British rather than Anglo-Saxon names.

Extensive research was ongoing into the 21st century on whether British Celtic did exert subtle influences on Old English, with a 2012 synthesis concluding "the evidence for Celtic influence on Old English is somewhat sparse, which only means that it remains elusive, not that it did not exist."

== Archaeological evidence ==
An Anglo-Frisian funerary urn excavated from the Snape ship burial in East Anglia. Item is located in Aldeburgh Moot Hall Museum

Until about 400, the archaeological evidence from Britain is mainly Roman in nature. As the Roman withdrawal from Britain proceeded, the archaeological evidence shows a clear collapse of this Roman material culture around 400. Roman towns and villas were abandoned. By 410 Roman coins became rare, and by 425 Roman pottery became rare in Britain. A distinctive Germanic material cultural associated with the Anglo-Saxons started to become dominant which was more exclusive in East Anglia, in contrast to southern England where cultural fusion with Romano-British traditions was more common. Also around 400, on the other side of the North Sea, both northern Gaul and the Saxon region in northern Germany show signs of a similar major crisis, and some comparable tendencies in archaeological evidence.

Although Roman authority collapsed in the early 5th century, many agricultural practices and even certain Roman field systems endured under new, potentially looser arrangements between local Britons and the incoming groups, with some material evidence indicates that coastal Saxon Shore forts, long assumed to be purely defensive, may also have served as trade or shipping hubs.

=== Cemeteries ===
The earliest Anglo-Saxon cemeteries are from the early 5th century. Two types of burial became popular:

- Cremations, with the ashes placed in urns and then buried in large urnfields. These are found mainly north of the Thames, and they appeared first in eastern England. These types of burials are very similar to urnfield cremations which had been common in northwestern Germany for centuries, and they continue to be seen as evidence for some amount of migration from there.
- Furnished inhumations, or burials with expensive grave goods, are somewhat less common and also more evenly spread over all of the lowland zones of eastern England, from Dorset to Eastern Yorkshire. These types of burials are first seen in northern Gaul, and then subsequently became popular in neighbouring Britain and present day northern Germany. It has therefore been suggested that this may have been a reaction to the breakdown of centralised Roman influence in these three neighbouring regions.

=== Metalwork ===
The cemeteries often reveal a mix of new local and foreign elements, some of which have also been seen as evidence of migration. Two in particular are of primary interest, which both began to be common in the mid 5th century:

- The Quoit brooch style of metalwork which is found mainly in southern England, on the Thames valley and south of it, having a particular association with eastern Kent. It was a style unique to Britain, and modern historians tend to associate it with local and Roman traditions.
- The Saxon Relief style was in contrast found almost entirely north of the Thames in lowland eastern England. Although it owes its ultimate inspiration to Roman models, it appears to be influenced by styles found in what is now northern Germany. It therefore continues to be seen as evidence of a migration.

=== Buildings ===
After the collapse of the Roman economy, the lavish styles of Roman buildings in towns and large villas were no longer built. Instead, two types of buildings are especially associated with rural settlements in Anglo-Saxon times.

- Sunken-featured buildings, also known by their German name Grubenhäuser, had a sunken floor dug out below ground level. Similar types of buildings were found in northern Germany, and appear to have influenced the style found in Britain. On the other hand, some historians regard the style as part of a broader northern European trend which might have been caused by new socio-economic conditions.
- Larger "halls" which used a wooden structure built upon large posts, sunk into post holes. Also in this case the influence of migrants from northern Germany is commonly proposed, although at least some aspects of the design have local precedents, and their popularity might partly be explained by the changing socio-economic conditions in parts of northern Europe which had been heavily dependent upon the Roman economy.

=== Biological evidence ===
Isotopic and skeletal analyses offer new perspectives on who the settlers were and how they lived. Oxygen and strontium tests conducted at sites like West Heslerton and Eastbourne show that migrants from the continent were both men and women and from multiple generations, while shared burial grounds suggested shorter-statured Britons and taller incomers often seem to have intermarried. The regional variation and the large number of mixed burial grounds supports the view that migration did not unfold as a single event but as a complex, evolving process.

From around 2010, research in archaeogenetics began to produce large amounts of new evidence for the movements of people and for the family relations of people in early medieval burial grounds. These studies suggested that the migration, which included both men and women, continued over several centuries, possibly allowing for significantly more new arrivals than had previously been thought. This led to the possibility of testing claims such as Bryan Ward-Perkins's statement in 2000 that while "culturally, the later Anglo-Saxons and English did emerge as remarkably un-British, [...] their genetic, biological make-up is none the less likely to have been substantially, indeed predominantly, British". As of the 2020s no new consensus had emerged.

== Genetic evidence ==
Genetic studies have provided new insights into the Anglo-Saxon migration, showing significant but regionally variable levels of continental ancestry in early medieval England. Archaeogenetic studies, based on data collected from skeletons found in Iron Age, Roman and Anglo-Saxon era burials, have concluded that the ancestry of the modern English population contains large contributions from both Anglo-Saxon migrants and Romano-British natives.

A 2022 study analysing 460 ancient genomes from England, Ireland, the Netherlands, Germany, and Denmark found that 25–47% of present-day English DNA originates from arrivals in the early Middle Ages and continental northern Europeans. The proportion was highest in eastern England, with early medieval individuals there deriving up to 76% of their ancestry from a northern European population spanning the Netherlands, northern Germany, and Denmark. However, individuals of local British ancestry also persisted, and there was evidence of intermarriage between these groups.

One of the study's authors, Duncan Sayer, stated: "You can't argue with [mass migration] any more. So what we could do is start to talk about what that migration actually is and who the people are and how they interact and how they build communities." Conversely, Susan Oosthuizen took the view that the study, despite "intending to demonstrate changes in northwest European DNA in England between 400 and 600, instead measured change between 300 and 800", and concluded that it did not offer "evidence for unusual levels of migration from northwest Europe in the fifth and sixth centuries".

Other studies have reinforced these findings. A 2020 study of Viking-era burials estimated that modern English populations derive 38% of their ancestry from native British sources and 37% from a Danish-like population, of which up to 6% may be attributed to Viking migrations. A 2016 study using ancient DNA from early medieval burials in Cambridgeshire found evidence of intermarriage between native Britons and continental immigrants, contradicting theories of strict segregation between the groups.

Some scholars have questioned whether it is legitimate to conflate ethnic and cultural identity with patterns highlighted by genetic evidence. A 2018 editorial for Nature warned against simplistic interpretations of ancient DNA data, cautioning that such studies risk reinforcing outdated "culture-history" models of the early 20th century. Scholars have also debated whether "Germanic" identity had any real ethnic or cultural unity outside of Roman ethnography.

== Competing descriptions of the settlement ==
The traditional account based largely on Bede and subsequent medieval writers has influenced much of the scholarly and popular perceptions of the process of anglicisation in Britain. It remains the starting point and 'default position', to which other hypotheses are compared in modern reviews of the evidence. In the twentieth century, support for the traditional account came in particular from historical linguists, who were able to add to the evidence of written sources the observation that Old English was little affected by the pre-existing Brittonic and Latin languages of Britain. There is linguistic and historical evidence for a significant movement of Brittonic-speakers to Armorica, after whom it was renamed Brittany. In 2014, Peter Schrijver stated "to a large extent, it is linguistics that is responsible for thinking in terms of drastic scenarios" about demographic change in late Roman Britain.

By around 2010, scholars broadly agreed that the Anglo-Saxon settlement involved a relatively limited number of migrants who seized power in eastern England, with local populations largely assimilating to their culture and language rather than being displaced. Old English thus spread chiefly through political dominance, leaving only faint Celtic linguistic traces.

Archaeological evidence indicates that sub-Roman Britain had significant economic and political structures into the 5th or 6th century, despite vulnerability to raids and settlement. According to Gildas, Saxon mercenaries hired by a weakened Roman administration revolted, seizing control in some regions. By Bede's era, kingdoms such as Wessex, Mercia, and Northumbria still housed many Britons, but law-codes show they had lower status, spurring assimilation. Over generations, Old English became the more prestigious language; Brittonic place-names were replaced through adaptation, new naming, or the general instability of settlements rather than by overwhelming demographic change.

Different descriptions of the Anglo-Saxon settlement demand varying assumptions about pre-existing Britons and incoming Germanic speakers, but there is no firm evidence for the exact numbers, and no consensus on how many lived in fourth-century Britain or arrived in the fifth. Estimates place the fourth-century population at 2–4 million, possibly declining to 1 million, while migrant numbers range between 20,000 and 200,000. Computer models, cemetery data, and demographic calculations point toward a smaller, ongoing influx in different regions, potentially boosted by Britons' losses to plagues or emigration, with the total immigrant proportion perhaps 10–20%.

The general view now is that the spread of Anglo-Saxon culture varied across Britain where the southeast experienced "mass migration", gradually shifting to "elite dominance" in the north and west. Place-name evidence supports this, with southeastern counties having almost no Brittonic names, in contrast to areas farther north and west. East Anglia, Lincolnshire, Essex and Kent all show archaeological signs of large-scale continental immigration, possibly tied to fourth-century depopulation or encouraged by strong local ports.

In Wessex, immigration came from both the south coast and the Thames valley, with Romano-British powers directing settlers inland, yet enough Germanic arrivals held sway to encourage Britons' assimilation. Farther north, in Bernicia, only a small group of immigrants may have seized local power, adopting some native institutions and art forms. Even into the eighth century, Wessex, Mercia and Northumbria still housed notable numbers of Britons.

== See also ==
- Timeline of conflict in Anglo-Saxon Britain
