= Susan Oosthuizen =

Medieval archaeologist and academic

Susan Oosthuizen FSA

Academic background
- Education: University of Cambridge
- Thesis: The development of the rural landscape of the Bourn Valley, south Cambridgeshire, c.600-1100 AD (2003)

Academic work
- Discipline: Archaeology
- Sub-discipline: Medieval archaeology; Early Middle Ages; landscape archaeology
- Institutions: University of Cambridge

Susan Oosthuizen FSA is Professor Emerita of Medieval Archaeology at the University of Cambridge. Her research focuses on rights of common, and on the development of the English landscape between about 400 and 1300 AD.

== Career ==
Oosthuizen's undergraduate degree in Archaeology and History was undertaken at the University of Southampton. She holds an MA in Area Studies (Africa) from SOAS University of London, and a PGCE in teaching history from the University of Cambridge. Her PhD on continuity and transformation in early medieval agricultural landscapes was undertaken in the University of Cambridge Department of Geography and Trinity Hall, Cambridge.

She was appointed Senior Lecturer in landscape history in the University of Cambridge in 2006, and promoted to Reader in Medieval Archaeology in 2013. Her promotion to full Professor in Medieval Archaeology in the University came in 2018. Based at the Institute of Continuing Education she also participated in the work of the Faculty of History, and remains a member of the Department of Archaeology where she is a Senior Fellow of the McDonald Institute for Archaeological Research.

Oosthuizen was involved in the governance of the University first as a member of the Board of Scrutiny and subsequently as a member of the University Council from 2011 until 2018. She remains a member of the University's governing body, the Regent House.

Elected to an Emeritus Fellowship of Wolfson College, Cambridge from January 2019, Oosthuizen was previously a Governing Body Fellow of the College from 2002 to 2018.

She holds a National Award for History Teaching in Higher Education, awarded by LTSN for History, Archaeology and Classics, The Historical Association, History at the Universities Defence Group, and The Royal Historical Society. She is also a Fellow of the Higher Education Academy. She was elected as a Fellow of the Society of Antiquaries of London (FSA) on 7 June 2007, and a Fellow of the Royal Historical Society (FRHistS) in 2015.

== Select publications ==
- Oosthuizen, S. 2025. "Panarchy and commons across the longue durée". In A Place for the Heathlands? Human-Health Relations in Deep Time and Contemporary Perspective, eds. Mette Løveshal and Karen Grønneberg. Aarhus University. Jutland Archaeological Society. ISBN 978-87-93423-73-2
- Oosthuizen, S. 2022. "Sutton Hoo: The wider context", Society of American Archaeology Archaeological Record 22 (1), 30-35. ISSN 1532-7299
- Oosthuizen, S. 2019. The Emergence of the English. Arc-Humanities Press, York. ISBN 978-1641891271
- Oosthuizen, S. 2019. "Property and governance: Making the Anglo-Saxon cultural landscape". In Power and Place in Medieval Europe, eds. A. Reynolds, B. Yorke, and J. Carroll. London, British Academy. ISBN 9780197266588
- Oosthuizen, S. 2017. The Anglo-Saxon Fenland. Oxbow, Oxford. ISBN 978-1911188087
- Oosthuizen, S. 2016. "Beyond Hierarchy: Archaeology, common rights and social identity". World Archaeology 48 (3). 381–394. doi:10.1080/00438243.2016.1180261
- Oosthuizen, S. 2016. "Culture and Identity in the Early Medieval Fenland Landscape". Landscape History 37(1). 5–24. doi:10.1080/01433768.2016.1176433
- Oosthuizen, S. 2016. "Recognizing and Moving on from a Failed Paradigm: The Case of Agricultural Landscapes in Anglo-Saxon England c. AD 400–800". Journal of Archaeological Research 24(2). 179–227. doi:10.1007/s10814-015-9088-x
- Oosthuizen, S. 2013. "Beyond Hierarchy: The archaeology of collective governance". World Archaeology 45(5). 714–729. doi:10.1080/00438243.2013.847634

== Critical response ==
In 2019, Oosthuizen published The Emergence of the English, in which she argued that, rather than being born out of conquest and settlement by Germanic-speaking tribes, the origins of England and the English people can be traced to political and demographic continuity with Roman Britain. Oosthuizen's ideas have been described as "anti-migrationist", and have received a critical response from several scholars of early Anglo-Saxon England.
