= List of English words of Brittonic origin =

Few English words are definitively known to come directly from Brittonic, the language of the Celtic inhabitants of Britain prior to the Anglo-Saxon settlement of Britain. Words of Celtic origin have entered the English language by a number of different pathways, and some have been attributed to Brittonic as well as its descendants or other Celtic languages. This list omits words of Celtic origin from these other pathways:

- Continental Celtic words adopted by Proto-Germanic speakers in continental Europe, prior to Anglo-Saxon settlement (e.g. down, iron, leather, rich).
- Words of Gaulish origin, which outnumber those of Brittonic origin. These words arrived through Norman French, which became the prestige language of England following the Norman Conquest, and was often strengthened in form and use by Church/state Latin (e.g. ambassador, bound, car, carpenter, piece).
- Words of Welsh origin (including Cornish), both descended from Brittonic (e.g. coracle, corgi, **crag**, flannel, **gull**, lawn, wrasse). Words in bold have also been attributed directly to Brittonic.
- Words of Scottish Gaelic origin (e.g. bog, bother, clan, hubbub, glen, keening, however see Irish below)
- Words of Irish origin (e.g. bog, clock, galore, gob, keening)
- Breton has chiefly been the source of local terms in archaeology (e.g. dolmen, menhir)

== List ==
Academia recognises beyond all reasonable doubt "fewer than ten" Brittonic loan-words in English that are neither historic nor obsolete. The following list derives mainly from surveys of possible Brittonic loanwords in English by Richard Coates, Dieter Kastovsky, and D. Gary Miller. Etymologies from the Oxford English Dictionary are included to indicate the view of this authoritative (but not necessarily definitive) source, distinguishing between the first, second, third and online editions. Words that are the most widely accepted as Brittonic loans are in bold.

Word	Possible Brittonic etymology	OED etymology	Type
ass (s. "donkey")	Old British *assin or Old Irish *assan, but more likely from Irish.	Celtic (OED1)	historic (widely used in the Bible instead of donkey)
bannock	Etymologised by the OED as from Gaelic bannach, ? < Latin pānicium < pānis bread. But possibly Old Brittonic *bannoc.	Gaelic (OED1)	historic
basket	On one theory, it is from Latin bascauda "kettle, table-vessel," said by the Roman poet Martial to be from Celtic British and perhaps cognate with Latin fascis "bundle, faggot," in which case it probably originally meant "wicker basket." But OED frowns on this, and there is no evidence of such a word in Celtic unless later words in Irish and Welsh, sometimes counted as borrowings from English, are original.	Unknown (OED Online)	common
beck	Agricultural implement with two hooks. Etymologised in the OED as from a 'Celtic root bacc-' (possibly via French). The similar Old English becca "fork" has been proposed as a Brittonic loan, though this has been questioned.	French (OED1)	technical
**bin**	Often considered to be from Old Brittonic *benna, but possibly a borrowing from Gallo-Roman.	Probably Celtic (OED1)	common
brat	Possibly from a Brittonic root meaning "cloak, cloth" (Old Welsh *breth or *brath), cognate with Old Irish bratt. However, the OED and recent scholars see the English word as coming from Irish. In Old English, bratt meant "cloak", but later came to mean "ragged garment", then "beggar's garment", and then "beggar's child", whence it attained its current meaning of "unruly child". "Brat" is still used in parts of Northern England to refer to a rough working apron.	Irish bratt (OED1)	common, pejorative
**brock**	From Brittonic *brocco-s, meaning "badger".	Celtic (OED1)	technical
**carr**	From carreg such as in Welsh, meaning 'rock'.	Old Northumbrian (OED1)	technical, local
**coomb**	From Old Brittonic *kumba, meaning "valley". Frequently used as a place-name element in southwestern England.	Probably Brittonic (OED1)	local
**crag**	According to the OED 'apparently of Celtic origin: compare Irish and Gaelic creag, Manx creg, cregg, Welsh craig rock. None of these, however, exactly gives the English crag, cragg'.	Celtic (OED1)	common
doe	Possibly from a Brittonic root *da-, but could also be from Latin.	Latin dāma (OED1)	technical
dun	According to the OED, 'perhaps < Celtic: compare Irish and Gaelic donn brown, Welsh dwn'.	Celtic (OED1)	common
gavelock	A kind of spear. Cf. 'Old Norse gaflak, gaflok neuter javelin (perhaps adopted < English), Welsh gaflach (said to mean ‘bearded arrow’), Irish gabhla lance, Old Northern French gavelot (12th cent.), gaverlot, gavrelot, garlot (= Central French javelot, Italian giavelotto ) javelin, whence Middle Dutch gavelot, gaverloot, Middle High German gabilôt'. Now thought to have been borrowed into English from Old Norse, which borrowed it from Old Irish.	Celtic (via Old French?) (OED1)	technical
gull	Probably from Brythonic Celtic; compare Welsh gwylan "gull," Cornish guilan, Breton goelann; all from Old Celtic *voilenno-. Replaced Old English mæw.	Welsh or Cornish (OED Online)	common
hog	Possibly from Brittonic *hukk. Given by the OED as a Celtic loan, related to Cornish "hoch"; Welsh "hwch," a pig or a sow, its connotation being a large instance.	Celtic (OED Online)	common
peat	Probably from a Celtic root *pett- (source also of Cornish peyth, Welsh peth "quantity, part, thing," Old Irish pet, Breton pez "piece").	Unknown (OED Online)	common
sark	Derived by Andrew Breeze from the Brittonic ancestor of Welsh seirch 'armour, trappings' (itself from Latin sarcīre 'patch').	Germanic *sarki-z (OED1)	historic
**tor**	'Generally held to be Celtic', per the OED, which cites Old Welsh twrr ‘heap, pile’ and Gaelic tòrr ‘hill of an abrupt or conical form, lofty hill, eminence, mound, grave, heap of ruins’.; possibly via Latin turris (tower) such as Glastonbury Tor. Especially used in Devon.	Celtic (OED1)	technical, local
wan	Possibly from Brittonic *wanno- and related to Welsh gwan, which has a similar meaning to the English word.	Unclear (OED Online)	common
yan, tan, tethera etc.	And variants. Most common in northern England, and ultimately from Brittonic *oinā, *deŭai, *tisrīs, etc., though heavily corrupted over time.	Unclear	local, historic

In extinct uses, seven main others are proposed, mainly by Andrew Breeze, seen in Old English. Though less controversial than others, some of the seven have been disputed:

funta
'fountain, spring.' Latin fontana and Church Latin (still used) font loaned into Brittonic and borrowed from either/both into Old English. Used in nine sets of settlements across counties west of London and east of Gillingham, Dorset: (Bedfont, (the) Chalfont(s), Mottisfont, Fonthill Bishop, Fontmell Magna, Fontwell, Teffont and Urchfont). Phrase the 'fount of all wisdom/knowledge' is cognate, seen to endure as a shorthand, poetic form of fountain.
luh
'pool', in use in the Northumbrian dialect of Old English. The modern English cognate, 'loch', is taken from Scottish Gaelic.
milpæþ
'army road', the first element of which is possibly from the Brittonic ancestor of Welsh mil 'thousand, army'.
prass
'pomp, array', perhaps from the Brittonic ancestor of Welsh pres 'soldiers in array'.
stor
'incense, wax'. However, the Oxford English Dictionary regards it as a Latin loan.
toroc
'bung.' Highly disputed. Possibly not even an English word–or an English word but not of Celtic origin.
wassenas
'retainers', possibly from Brittonic.

== See also ==
- Brittonicisms in English
- Celtic language-death in England
