= English Place-Name Society =

British learned society focussing on place-names

The English Place-Name Society (EPNS) is a learned society concerned with toponomastics and the toponymy of England, in other words, the study of place-names (toponyms).

Its scholars aim to explain the origin and history of the names they study, taking into account factors such as the meaning of the elements out of which they were created (whether from the principal endemic tongues Old English, early Welsh, Danish, Norwegian, Cornish, Latin, Norman French – or others); the topography, geology and ecology of the places bearing the names; and the general and local history and culture of England.

== History ==
In 1922 Allen Mawer read a paper to the British Academy proposing a survey of English place-names. He obtained the formal and financial support of the academy. Within a year he had brought into being a society composed of interested persons, provided it with a constitution, and laid down the lines of its future conduct. The headquarters of the Society were first at the University of Liverpool, where Mawer was professor of the English language. The publications of the Society began in 1924, with two volumes: a collection of essays and a dictionary of place-name elements. Mawer and Aileen Armstrong acted as general editors for the annual volumes of county place-name surveys. Starting in 1929, J. E. B. Gover collected material and was sub-editor of the volumes.

In 1929, Mawer was appointed provost of University College, London, and the Society moved there at the end of the year. At the outbreak of World War II, the Society removed briefly to University College, Aberystwyth, back to London, and then to Stansted Bury, Stanstead Abbotts, in eastern Hertfordshire. In July 1942, Sir Allen Mawer died, and Sir Frank Stenton became general editor. The Society moved to the University of Reading until 1946. When Bruce Dickins succeeded as honorary director, the Society removed to the University of Cambridge and Margaret Midgley (later Gelling) was appointed research assistant.

When Hugh Smith assumed the position of honorary director in 1951, University College, London, became once more the Society's headquarters, with Midgley continuing research there until 1953. Hugh Smith produced two new "Elements" volumes and 14 others on county place-names. Upon his death in 1967, Kenneth Cameron became honorary director and the Society's offices were split between London and Nottingham, where the university provided room for the library and archives, as well as the services of a secretary. In 1972 the Society moved completely to Nottingham, where it remains at the Centre for Name Studies. Victor Watts became honorary director in 1992 until his death in 2002, when he was succeeded by Richard Coates.

The survey has been consistently supported, morally and practically, by the British Academy. From 2005 to 2010, it was supported as well by a large grant from the Arts and Humanities Research Council.

== Research breakthroughs ==
From the 1960s detailed comparison of distributions of the place-name types which had been thought to be early Saxon – and of archaeological evidence – has produced a re-written interpretation of some. The net effect, statistically, has been to find an original bias towards Anglo-Saxon. This means more names re-attributed, than the reverse, have been shown to be more likely Celtic. In particular, Kenneth Jackson contributed to much of the research, identification and morphology of Celtic names.

== Publications ==
=== Traditional county or county subdivision publications ===
The Society divides England firstly by traditional counties. The vast majority (or more convenient subdivisions) are sequentially covered in 96 volumes of the Survey of English Place-Names, although the earlier volumes are less detailed. These are used mainly by scholars and academia. The volumes for Warwickshire and much of Yorkshire (the North and East Ridings and parts of the West Riding) are available free of charge on the society's website. In 2016, the Society published its first volume in the "Popular Series", on the county of Suffolk.

=== Other publications ===
By 2018 the society had published a range of other books and booklets by category (e.g. field-names), and some county dictionaries aimed mainly at a non-specialist audience.

The Society is publishing a 2010s series of booklets on place-name elements, running in to the 2020s.

Since 1969, the Society has published an annual Journal, which contains essays on various place-name topics.

=== Substantial citation ===
EPNS material was used as the basis of The Cambridge Dictionary of English Place-Names, published in 2004.

== See also ==
- English toponymy
- Scottish Place-Name Society
- Welsh Place-Name Society
- Ainmean-Àite na h-Alba
- Society for Name Studies in Britain and Ireland
- International Council of Onomastic Sciences
- Rude Britain, a book of selected British toponymy
- Richard Coates
- Eilert Ekwall
- Oliver Padel

== Bibliography ==
- Armstrong, A. M.; Gelling, Margaret; Cameron, K. (1993). "Some notes on the history of the English Place-Name Society". Journal of the English Place-Name Society. 25: 1–8.
- Cameron, Kenneth (1996). English Place-Names (6th ed.). London: Batsford. ISBN 0713473789.
- Ekwall, Eilert (1960) [1936]. Concise Oxford Dictionary of English Place-Names (4th ed.). Oxford: Oxford University Press. ISBN 0198691033.
- Gelling, Margaret (1998–1999). "Presidential Address: on the occasion of the 75th Anniversary of the English Place-Name Society, Wednesday 15 July 1998". Journal of the English Place-Name Society. 31: 5–8.
- Mills, A. D. (1991). Dictionary of English Place-Names. Oxford: Oxford University Press. ISBN 9780198691563.
- Smith, A. H.; Cameron, H. K.; Jackson, K. (2008). English Place-Name Elements. English Place-Name Society. Vol. 25/26. Nottingham: English Place-Name Society. ISBN 978-0904889819.
- Watts, Victor, ed. (2004). The Cambridge Dictionary of English Place-Names: based on the collections of the English Place-Name Society. Cambridge: Cambridge University Press. ISBN 9780521362092.
