= Kenneth Cameron (toponymist) =

British toponymist and academic

Kenneth Cameron, CBE, FSA, FRHistS, FBA (21 May 1922 – 10 March 2001) was a British toponymist and academic, specialising in English place-names. Having taught at the University of Sheffield from 1947 to 1950, he moved to the University of Nottingham where he spent the rest of his career and was Professor of English Language from 1963 to 1987. From 1966 to 1993, he was Honorary Director of the English Place-Name Society and General Editor of the English Place-Name Survey: he was editor of the Society's Journal from 1972 to 1990.

== Honours ==
In 1976, Cameron was elected a Fellow of the British Academy (FBA), the United Kingdom's national academy for the humanities and social sciences. He had also been elected a Fellow of the Royal Historical Society (FRHistS) in 1970 and a Fellow of the Society of Antiquaries of London (FSA) in 1984. In the 1987 New Year Honours, he was appointed Commander of the Order of the British Empire (CBE).

In 1969, Cameron was awarded the Sir Israel Gollancz Prize by the British Academy. In 1990, he was awarded the Jöran Sahlgren Prize by the Royal Gustavus Adolphus Academy. He was the subject of a Festschrift edited by Thorlac Turville-Petre and Margaret Gelling: Studies in Honour of Kenneth Cameron, Leeds Studies in English, no. 18 (1987). This contains a bibliography of his published works up to 1985.

== Selected works ==
- Cameron, Kenneth (1959). The Place-Names of Derbyshire, parts 1–3, Survey of English Place-Names, vols. 27–29. Nottingham: English Place-Name Society.
- Cameron, Kenneth (1961). English Place-Names (1st ed.).
- Cameron, Kenneth (1966). Scandinavian Settlement in the Territory of the Five Boroughs: The Place-Name Evidence. Nottingham: University of Nottingham.
- Cameron, Kenneth (ed.) (1975). Place-Name Evidence for the Anglo-Saxon Invasion and Scandinavian Settlements: Eight Studies. Nottingham: English Place-Name Society.
- Cameron, Kenneth (1985). The Place-Names of Lincolnshire, part 1: The County of the City of Lincoln, Survey of English Place-Names, vol. 58. Nottingham: English Place-Name Society.
- Cameron, Kenneth (1991). The Place-Names of Lincolnshire, part 2: Yarborough Wapentake, Survey of English Place-Names, vols. 64 and 65. Nottingham: English Place-Name Society.
- Cameron, Kenneth; Field, John; Ingsley, John (1992). The Place-Names of Lincolnshire, part 3: The Wapentake of Walshcroft, Survey of English Place-Names, vol. 66. Nottingham: English Place-Name Society.
- Cameron, Kenneth (1996). English place names (6th ed.). London: B.T. Batsford. ISBN 978-0713473780.
- Cameron, Kenneth; Field, John; Ingsley, John (1996). The Place-Names of Lincolnshire, part 4: The Wapentakes of Ludborough and Haverstoe, Survey of English Place-Names, vol. 71. Nottingham: English Place-Name Society.
- Cameron, Kenneth; Field, John; Ingsley, John (1997). The Place-Names of Lincolnshire, part 5: The Wapentake of Bradley, Survey of English Place-Names, vol. 73. Nottingham: English Place-Name Society.
- Cameron, Kenneth (1998). A Dictionary of Lincolnshire Place-Names. Nottingham: English Place-Name Society. ISBN 978-0904889581.
- Cameron, Kenneth; Field, John; Ingsley, John (2001). The Place-Names of Lincolnshire, part 6: The Wapentakes of Manley and Aslacoe, Survey of English Place-Names, vol. 77. Nottingham: English Place-Name Society.
