= Alan Rayburn =

Canadian geographer (1932–2019)

Alan Rayburn (15 November 1932 – 26 September 2019) was a Canadian writer and geographer who specialized in the study of toponymy.

== Biography ==
Rayburn was born on 15 November 1932. After earning a degree in geography, he joined the Geographical Branch of the Federal Department of Mines and Technical Survey in 1957, where he worked on the creation of a Canadian atlas. He was appointed as the first official toponymic researcher in Canada in 1967, and was among the charter members of the Ontario Geographic Names Board and the Toponymic Division of the Canadian Permanent Committee on Geographic Names. From 1979 to 1982, Rayburn served as the president of the Canadian Society for the Study of Names.

Recognized as an authority on North American toponymy, Rayburn wrote over 100 articles and eight books across his career. He wrote extensively for Canadian Geographic, and published several scholarly works in Names: A Journal of Onomastics.

Rayburn died on 26 September 2019 in Ontario, at the age of 86. He is buried at St. Patrick's Cemetery in Ontario.

== Publications ==
- Rayburn, Alan (1967). Geographical Names of Renfrew County. Geographical Branch. Ottawa: Department of Energy Mines and Resources. OCLC 46823. (Note: A second edition of Geographical Names of Renfrew County was published in 1989 by Alan Rayburn Associates.)
- — (1973). Geographical Names of Prince Edward Island. Ottawa: Canadian Permanent Committee on Geographical Names. ISBN 978-0-6600-1740-2.
- — (1975). Geographical Names of New Brunswick. Ottawa: Canadian Permanent Committee on Geographical Names. OCLC 2170169.
- — (1993). Lost Names and Places of Eastern Ontario. Ontario Genealogical Society. ISBN 978-1-5511-6926-2.
- — (1994). Naming Canada. University of Toronto Press. ISBN 978-0-8020-6990-0.
- — (1997). Dictionary of Canadian Place Names. Oxford University Press. ISBN 978-0-1954-1086-0.
- — (1997). Place Names of Ontario. University of Toronto Press. ISBN 978-0-8020-7207-8.
- — (2010). Place Names of Canada. Oxford University Press. ISBN 978-0-1954-3153-7. (Note: Place Names of Canada (2010) is the second edition of Dictionary of Canadian Place Names (1997). The second edition includes a revised preface and new introduction.)
