= Canadian Society for the Study of Names =

Canadian organization

- Société canadienne d'onomastique (Note: French: Société canadienne pour l'étude des noms (SCEN) from 1977–1986. Société canadienne d'onomastique (SCO) from 1986–present.)
- Abbreviation: CSSN
- Formation: 1967; 59 years ago
- Founded at: Carleton University
- Type: Learned society
- Registration no.: 890866965RR0001
- Legal status: Charitable organization
- Location: Guelph, Ontario, Canada
- Fields: Onomastics
- Official languages: English; French
- President: Yaïves Ferland
- Publication: Onomastica Canadiana

The Canadian Society for the Study of Names (CSSN) is a learned society founded in 1967 to promote onomastics, the study of names and naming practices, in Canada and internationally. The society publishes the open access journal Onomastica Canadiana twice yearly.

== History ==
In 1966, Jaroslav Rudnyckyj proposed the creation of a Canadian onomastics institute at the ninth International Congress of Onomastic Sciences in London, England. The following year, in 1967, the Canadian Institute of Onomastic Sciences was established and the first meeting held at Carleton University. The organization was renamed as the Canadian Society for the Study of Names in 1977, and in 1979 its constitution was adopted in Saskatoon, Saskatchewan.

== Publications ==
Onomastica Canadiana (Note: ISSN 0078-4656 (print). ISSN 2816-7015 (online).) is the official peer-reviewed journal of the Canadian Society for the Study of Names. Published twice yearly, the journal includes articles in both English and French on topics in the field of onomastics and name studies. Established in 1951, the first issue of the journal was published under the title Onomastica, and in 1982 its name was changed to Onomastica Canadiana. In 2022, Onomastica Canadiana became a digital publication hosted by the University of Western Ontario using Open Journal Systems. Articles published in Onomastica Canadiana since 2022 are open access and freely available under a Creative Commons license.

Beginning in 1977, CSSN also published a bulletin known as The Name Gleaner.

== Notable members ==
- Sheila Embleton, president from 1988 to 1994.
- Helen Kerfoot, president from 1997 to 2003.
- Alan Rayburn, president from 1979 to 1982.
- Jaroslav Rudnyckyj, first president from 1967 to 1970.
- Yar Slavutych, president from 1976 to 1979.
