= Richard Coates =

English linguist

- Born: 16 April 1949 (age 77); Grimsby, Lincolnshire
- Citizenship: United Kingdom
- Education: University of Cambridge
- Known for: Historical linguistics Philology of northern and western European languages Onomastics, especially place-names, theory of names and naming
- Scientific career
- Fields: Linguistics
- Workplaces: University of the West of England, Bristol (previously at University of Sussex)
- Doctoral advisor: John Trim
- Other academic advisors: Pieter A. M. Seuren, Erik C. Fudge, Roy A. Wisbey, Peter Rickard, Martin Harris

Richard Coates (born 16 April 1949, in Grimsby, Lincolnshire, and educated at Wintringham School) is an English linguist. He was professor of Linguistics (alternatively professor of Onomastics) at the University of the West of England, Bristol, now emeritus.

== Career ==
From 1977 to 2006 he taught at the University of Sussex, where he was professor of linguistics (1991–2006) and Dean of the School of Cognitive and Computing Sciences (1998–2003). From 1980 to 1989 he was assistant secretary and then secretary of the Linguistics Association of Great Britain. He was honorary director of the Survey of English Place-Names from 2003 to 2019, having previously (1997–2002) been president of the English Place-Name Society which conducts the Survey, resuming this role from 2019 to 2024. From 2002 to 2008, he was secretary of the International Council of Onomastic Sciences, a body devoted to the promotion of the study of names, and elected as one of its two vice-presidents from 2011 to 2017. He was elected a fellow of the Society of Antiquaries in 1992 and of the Royal Society of Arts in 2001.

== Research ==
His main academic interests are proper names (both from the historical and the theoretical perspective), historical linguistics in general, the philology of the Germanic, Romance and Celtic languages, regional variation in language, and local history. He is editor of the Survey of English Place-Names for Hampshire and was principal investigator of the AHRC-funded project Family Names of the United Kingdom (FaNUK), running from 2010 to 2016, of which Patrick Hanks was lead researcher.

He has written books on the names of the Channel Islands, the local place-names of St Kilda, Hampshire and Sussex, the dialect of Sussex, and, with Andrew Breeze, on Celtic place-names in England, as well as over 500 academic articles, notes, and collections on related topics. His main contribution to linguistic theory is The Pragmatic Theory of Properhood, set out in a number of articles since 2000.

He is the author of Word Structure, a student's introduction to linguistic morphology (Routledge).

== Selected books ==
- 1987 (co-ed. with John Lyons, Margaret Deuchar and Gerald Gazdar) New horizons in linguistics 2. Harmondsworth: Pelican. (ISBN 978-0-14-022612-6).
- 1989 The place-names of Hampshire. London: Batsford. (ISBN 0-7134-5625-6).
- 1990 The place-names of St Kilda: nomina hirtensia. Lewiston, New York: Edwin Mellen Press. (ISBN 9780199677764 Celtic Studies 1). (ISBN 0-88946-077-9).
- 1991 The ancient and modern names of the Channel Islands: a linguistic history. Stamford: Paul Watkins. (ISBN 1-871615-15-1).
- 1999 Word structure. London and New York: Routledge (Routledge Language Workbooks). (ISBN 0 415 20631 6).
- 2000 (with Andrew Breeze) Celtic voices, English places: studies of the Celtic impact on place-names in England. Stamford: Shaun Tyas. (ISBN 1-900289-41-5).
- 2010 The traditional dialect of Sussex: a history, description, selected texts, bibliography and discography. Lewes: Pomegranate Press. (ISBN 978-1-907242-09-0.)
- 2016 (co-ed. with Patrick Hanks and Peter McClure) The Oxford dictionary of family names in the United Kingdom. Oxford: Oxford University Press. (ISBN 9780199677764; also ebook and online versions.)
- 2017 Your city's place-names: Brighton and Hove. Nottingham: English Place-Name Society. (ISBN 9780904889970).
- 2017 Your city's place-names: Bristol. Nottingham: English Place-Name Society (ISBN 9780904889963).
- 2020 (co-ed. with Luisa Caiazzo and Maoz Azaryahu) Naming, identity and tourism. Newcastle: Cambridge Scholars Publishing (ISBN 1527542866, ISBN 9781527542860).
- 2023 (ed.) Shirehampton Church-Yard Book. Bristol: Bristol Record Society publication 76 (ISBN 978-0-901538-46-8).

== See also ==
- Etymology of London
