= Margaret Gelling =

English toponymist

Margaret Joy Gelling
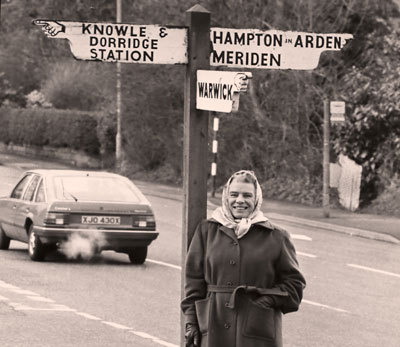
- Born: Margaret Joy Midgley; 29 November 1924; Manchester, England
- Died: 24 April 2009 (aged 84)
- Education: Chislehurst Grammar School; St Hilda's College, Oxford (BA); University College London (PhD)
- Occupation: toponymist
- Spouse: Peter Stanley Gelling

Margaret Joy Gelling, OBE, FBA, FSA (née Midgley; 29 November 1924 – 24 April 2009) was an English toponymist, known for her extensive studies of English place-names. She served as President of the English Place-Name Society from 1986 to 1998, and Vice-President of the International Council of Onomastic Sciences from 1993 to 1999, as well as being a Fellow of St Hilda's College, Oxford. She was an elected fellow of both the Society of Antiquaries of London and the British Academy.

Born in Manchester and raised in Kent, she studied at St Hilda's College, and became involved in socialist activism. She proceeded to work for the English Place-Name Society from 1946 to 1953, focusing her research on the place-names of Oxfordshire and Berkshire. She married the archaeologist Peter Gelling of the University of Birmingham in 1952, and moved to Harborne in Birmingham while undertaking her PhD research into the place-names of West Berkshire. Lecturing on the subject in the Midlands, she published her research in a series of books, achieving prominence within academia for her 1978 work Signposts to the Past: The Geographical Roots of Britain's Place-names. In the coming decades she focused on researching the place-names of Shropshire, resulting in a multi-volume publication, earning a number of awards and prominent appointments for her life's work.

Gelling's work focused on establishing the Old English origins of English place-names in the Midlands, and her approach sought to connect toponyms to geographical features in the landscape.

== Biography ==
=== Early life: 1924–1951 ===
Margaret Joy Midgley was born to a lower-middle-class family in Manchester on 29 November 1924, the daughter of an insurance salesman. As a child, her family moved to Sidcup in Kent, and she gained her secondary education from Chislehurst Grammar School. The first member of her family to attend university, she studied English language and literature at St Hilda's College, Oxford, where she was influenced by Dorothy Whitelock, who inspired her interest in place-names. Graduating in 1945, she later related that the experience at Oxford had been a "waste of time", believing English literature to be "dreadfully boring". Politically a socialist, at Oxford she had joined the Communist Party of Great Britain, and enjoyed arguing politics with her right-wing family.

Working for a year as a temporary civil servant in London, in 1946 she gained employment as a research assistant with the English Place-Name Society, based in Cambridge. She continued to work here for eight years, focusing her research on expanding and collating the place-names of Oxfordshire and Berkshire, a project that had been started by Frank Merry Stenton and his wife Doris Mary Stenton; her work in this field would see publication as the two volume The Place-Names of Oxfordshire (1953–54). She felt that her approach differed from Stenton's on political grounds; she believed most place-names had been developed by ordinary working people, whereas she thought that he "empathised with the ruling classes."

=== Success: 1952–2009 ===
In 1952 she married the Manx archaeologist Peter Gelling, who soon obtained a teaching job at the University of Birmingham. For this reason, the couple moved to Harborne where she remained for the rest of her life. There, she would spend much time gardening, and although had no children of her own, raised her nephew, Adrian Midgley, from the age of six. She would undertake research for a PhD from the University of London by correspondence, supervised by Albert Hugh Smith; devoted to the place-names of West Berkshire, her thesis was completed in 1957. Having left the Communist Party, she still considered herself "very left-wing", campaigning on behalf of the local branch of the centre-left Labour Party.

She accompanied her husband on his archaeological excavations to various sites, both domestically and abroad. In the 1960s, she accompanied him to Alto Plano in Peru to study the development of potato cultivation, where she gained experience in cooking at high altitude. In the early 1970s, she travelled with him to Cyprus, where she was sorting through finds in the castle at Kyrenia when the Turkish army invaded in July 1974. For a number of seasons she managed morale and catering at the excavation camp at Deerness, Orkney, which her husband used as a training dig for his students.

During the 1960s, she published a series of innovative books on English place-names, also lecturing on the subject across the English Midlands under the aegis of the University of Birmingham's Department of Extra-Mural Studies. She also lectured at Birmingham University on occasion, as well as running a summer school at Oxford. She went on to publish her three volumes of The Place-Names of Berkshire (1973, 1974 and 1976), which she followed with Signposts to the Past: Place-Names and the History of England (1978), a book which "put her in an elevated position among English toponymists" and which saw revised editions in 1987 and 1997.

Peter Gelling died in 1983, while Margaret took on the presidency of the English Place-Name Society from 1986 to 1998, and then the Vice-Presidency of the International Council of Onomastic Sciences from 1993 to 1999. Becoming a fellow of St Hilda's College in 1993, she was awarded an Order of the British Empire (OBE) in 1995, and in 1998, she was elected a Fellow of the British Academy, a rare feat for an individual who had never held an academic position. She continued lecturing widely until developing the illness from which she died.

== Publications ==
=== Books ===
- Gelling, Margaret (1953). Place-Names of Oxfordshire, Part I. Vol. XXIII. Cambridge: English Place-Name Society.
- Gelling, Margaret (1954). Place-Names of Oxfordshire, Part II. Vol. XXIV. Cambridge: English Place-Name Society.
- Nicolaisen, W.F.H.; Gelling, Margaret; Richards, Melville (1970). The Names of Towns and Cities in Britain. London: B.T. Batsford Ltd. ISBN 9780713401134.
- Gelling, Margaret (1973). Place-Names of Berkshire, Part I. Vol. XLIX. Cambridge: English Place-Name Society. ISBN 0-904889-60-2.
- Gelling, Margaret (1973). Place-Names of Berkshire, Part II. Vol. LI. Cambridge: English Place-Name Society. ISBN 0-521-20034-2.
- Gelling, Margaret (1976). The Place-Names of Berkshire: Part III. County Volumes of the Survey of English Place-Names English Place-Name Society. ISBN 9780904889000
- Gelling, Margaret (1978). Signposts to the Past. Place-Names and the History of England. London: J.M. Dent & Son. ISBN 0-460-04264-5.
- Gelling, Margaret (1979). The Early Charters of the Thames Valley. Leicester: Leicester University Press. ISBN 0-7185-1132-8.
- Gelling, Margaret (1984). Place-Names in the Landscape: The Geographical Roots of Britain's Place-names. London: J.M. Dent & Son. ISBN 0-460-04380-3.
- Gelling, Margaret; Foxall, H.D.G. (1990). Place-Names of Shropshire, Part I. Vol. LXII–LXIII. English Place-Name Society.
- Gelling, Margaret (1992). The West Midlands in the Early Middle Ages. Studies in the Early History of Britain. Leicester: Leicester University Press. ISBN 0-7185-1395-9.
- Gelling, Margaret (1995). Place-Names of Shropshire, Part II: the Hundreds of Ford and Condover. Vol. LXX. Nottingham: English Place-Name Society. ISBN 0-904889-43-2.
- Gelling, Margaret. Place-Names of Shropshire, Part III: The Place-Names of Shropshire, Part III: Telford New Town, The Northern part of Munslow Hundred and the Franchise of Wenlock. English Place-Name Society.
- Gelling, Margaret; Cole, Ann (2000). The Landscape of Place-Names. Shaun Tyas. ISBN 1-900289-26-1.
- Gelling, Margaret (2006). Place-Names of Shropshire, Part IV: Shrewsbury Town and Suburbs and the Liberties of Shrewsbury. Nottingham: English Place-Name Society. ISBN 0-904889-67-X.
- Gelling, Margaret (2006). Place-Names of Shropshire, Part V: The Place-Names of Shropshire, Part IV: the Hundreds of Pimhill and Bradford North. Nottingham: English Place-Name Society.

=== Articles ===
- Gelling, Margaret (1967). "English place-names derived from the compound Wicham". Medieval Archaeology. XI. The Society for Medieval Archaeology: 103.
- Gelling, Margaret (1987). "A brief comment from across the dyke". Journal of the English Place-Name Society. 19: 43–44.
- Armstrong, A. M.; Gelling, Margaret; Cameron, K. (1993). "Some notes on the history of the English Place-Name Society". Journal of the English Place-Name Society. 25: 1–8.
- Gelling, Margaret (1993). "Paganism and Christianity in Wirral?". Journal of the English Place-Name Society. 25: 11.
- Gelling, Margaret (1998). "The etymology of Rouncil". Journal of the English Place-Name Society. 30: 105–6.
- Gelling, Margaret (1999). "Presidential address: on the occasion of the 75th anniversary of the English Place-Name Society, Wednesday 15th July 1998". Journal of the English Place-Name Society. 31: 5–8.
- Gelling, Margaret (2003). "English place-name studies: some reflections". Journal of the English Place-Name Society. 35: 5–16.
- Gelling, Margaret; Probert, Duncan (2010). "Old English stoc 'place'". Journal of the English Place-Name Society. 42: 79–85.
