= Scottish Place-Name Society =

The Scottish Place-Name Society (Comann Ainmean-Áite na h-Alba in Gaelic) is a learned society in Scotland concerned with toponymy, the study of place-names. Its scholars aim to explain the origin and history of the place-names they study, taking into account the meaning of the elements out of which they were created; the topography, geology and ecology of the places bearing the names; and the general and local history and culture of Scotland.

The Society was founded in February 1996. The Society's journal, The Journal of Scottish Name Studies (JSNS), has been published since 2007.

== See also ==
- Ainmean-Àite na h-Alba
- English Place-Name Society
- Society for Name Studies in Britain and Ireland
- Scottish Society for Northern Studies
