= Onomastics =

Study of proper names

Onomastics (or onomatology in older texts) is the study of proper names, including their etymology, history, and use.

An alethonym ('true name') or an orthonym ('real name') is the proper name of the object in question, the object of onomastic study. Scholars studying onomastics are called onomasticians.

Onomastics has applications in data mining, with applications such as named-entity recognition, or recognition of the origin of names. It is a popular approach in historical research, where it can be used to identify ethnic minorities within populations and for the purposes of prosopography.

== Etymology ==
Onomastics originates from the Greek onomastikós (ὀνομαστικός, 'of or belonging to naming'), itself derived from ónoma (ὄνομα, 'name').

== Branches ==
- Toponymy (or more precisely toponomastics), one of the principal branches of onomastics, is the study of place names.
- Anthroponymy is the study of personal names.
- Literary onomastics is the branch that researches the names in works of literature and other fiction.
- Socio-onomastics is the study of names within a society or culture.

== See also ==
- Ancient Greek personal names
- Extinction of surnames
- Hydronym
- Mononymous persons
- Naming convention
- -onym, listing the technical kinds of names

=== Organizations ===
- American Name Society
- Canadian Society for the Study of Names
- English Place-Name Society
- Guild of One-Name Studies
- International Council of Onomastic Sciences
- Society for Name Studies in Britain and Ireland
- United Nations Group of Experts on Geographical Names
