= Migrationism and diffusionism =

Archaeological theory for cultural changes

In archaeological theory, migrationism and diffusionism (or "immobilism") were two distinguishing approaches to explaining the spread of prehistoric archaeological cultures and innovations in artefact. Migrationism explains cultural change in terms of human migration, while diffusionism relies on explanations based on trans-cultural diffusion of ideas rather than populations (pots, not people).

Western archaeology the first half of the 20th century relied on the assumption of migration and invasion as driving cultural change. That was criticized by the processualists in the 1960s and 1970s, leading to a new mainstream which rejected "migrationism" as outdated. Since the 1990s, there has been renewed interest in "migrationist" scenarios, as archaeologists attempted the archaeological reflexes of migrations known to have occurred historically. Since the 2000s, the developments in archaeogenetics have opened a new avenue for investigation, based on the analysis of ancient DNA.

Kristiansen (1989) argued that the reasons for embracing "immobilism" during the Cold War era were ideological and derived from an emphasis on political solutions displacing military action.

== History ==
"Diffusionism", in its original use in the 19th and early 20th centuries, did not preclude migration or invasion. It was rather the term for assumption of any spread of cultural innovation, including by migration or invasion, as opposed "evolutionism", assuming the independent appearance of cultural innovation in a process of parallel evolution, termed "cultural evolutionism".

Opposition to migrationism as argued in the 1970s had an ideological component of anti-nationalism derived from Marxist archaeology, going back to V. Gordon Childe, who during the interwar period combined "evolutionism" and "diffusionism" and argued an intermediate position that each society developed in its own way but was strongly influenced by the spread of ideas from elsewhere. In contrast to Childe's moderate position, which allowed the diffusion of ideas and even moderate migration, Soviet archaeology adhered to a form of extreme evolutionism, which explained all cultural change from the class tensions internal to prehistoric societies.

"Migrationism" fell from favour in mainstream western archeology in the 1970s. Adams (1978:483f.) described migrationism an "ad hoc explanation for cultural, linguistic, and racial change in such an extraordinary number of individual cases that to speak of a migrationist school of explanation seems wholly appropriate". Adams (p. 484) argued that the predominance of migrationism "down to the middle of the last [19th] century" could be explained because it "was and is the only explanation for culture change that can comfortably be reconciled with a literal interpretation of the Old Testament", and as such representing an outdated "creationist" view of prehistory, now to be challenged by "nonscriptural, anticreationist" views. Adams (p. 489) accepts only as "inescapable" migrationist scenarios that concern the first peopling of a region, such the first settlement of the Americas "by means of one or more migrations across the Bering land bridge" and "successive sweeps of Dorset and of Thule peoples across the Canadian Arctic".

While Adams criticized the migration of identifiable "peoples" or "tribes" was deconstructed as a "creationist" legacy based in biblical literalism, Smith (1966) had made a similar argument deconstructing the idea of "nations" or "tribes" as a "primordalistic" misconception based in modern nationalism. Historian Alex Woolf notes that "in the minds of some scholars, immobilism was charged with a left-wing caché [sic]; those who showed too much interest in the ethnic or racial origin of the people they studied were, it was hinted, guilty of racist tendencies."

While mainstream western archaeology maintained moderate scenarios of migrationism in spite of such criticism, it did move away from "invasionism". The mainstream view came to depict prehistoric cultural change as the result of gradual, limited migration of a small population that would consequently become influential in spreading new ideas but would contribute little to the succeeding culture's biological ancestry.

Thus, the mainstream position on the Neolithic Revolution in Europe as developed (notably by the German archaeologist Jens Lüning) since the 1980s, posits that "a small group of immigrants inducted the established inhabitants of Central Europe into sowing and milking" in a process spreading "in swift pace, in a spirit of 'peaceful cooperation'" Migration was generally seen as being a slow process, involving family groups moving into new areas and settling amongst the native population, described as "demic diffusion" or "wave of advance", in which population would be essentially sedentary but expand by the colonisation of new territory by succeeding generations.

The question remained intractable until the arrival of archaeogenetics since the 1990s. The new field's rapid development since the 2000s has resulted in an increasing number of studies presenting quantitative estimates on the genetic impact of migrating populations. In several cases, that has led to a revival of the "invasionist" or "mass migration" scenario (in the case of the Neolithic Revolution in Europe) or at least suggested that the extent of prehistoric migration had been underestimated (e.g. in the context of Indo-European expansion, it was estimated that the people of the Yamnaya culture in Eastern Europe contributed to 73% of the ancestry of individuals pertaining to the Corded Ware culture in Germany, and to about 40–54% to the ancestry of modern Central & Northern Europeans.)

In British archaeology, the Anglo-Saxon migration debate has notably pitted the two schools against each other on the subject of the Anglo-Saxon settlement of Britain. The traditional Anglo-Saxon migrationist view was that of a mass invasion in which the Anglo-Saxon incomers drove the native Romano-British inhabitants to the western fringes of the island. This was challenged in the latter half of the 20th century with the hypothesis that only a small Anglo-Saxon "warrior elite" migrated who gradually acculturated the Romano-Britons. This has moderated recently partly due to genetic studies of British populations with most scholars in Britain having returned to a more migrationist perspective and noted that the scale of both the settlement of the Anglo-Saxons and the survival of the Romano-Britons likely varied regionally.

== See also ==
- Demic diffusion
- Kulturkreis
- Stratum (linguistics)
- Sedentism
- Pre-modern human migration
- List of invasions
- Invasions of the British Isles
- Indo-European expansion
- Kurgan hypothesis
- Doric invasion
- Missionary
- Mongol invasions
- Nomadic empire
- Turkic expansion
- Russian invasion of Ukraine
