= Comberton (disambiguation) =

Comberton may refer to:

- Comberton, Cambridgeshire, England
- Comberton, Herefordshire, England, a hamlet in Orleton parish
- Great Comberton, Worcestershire, England
- Little Comberton, Worcestershire, England
