= Ainmean-Àite na h-Alba =

National advisory partnership for Gaelic place names in Scotland

Ainmean-Àite na h-Alba (Scottish Gaelic pronunciation: [ˈɛnɛmən ˈaːʰtʲə nə ˈhal̪ˠapə]; "Gaelic Place-Names of Scotland") is the national advisory partnership for Scottish Gaelic place names in Scotland. Ainmean-Àite na h-Alba are based at Sabhal Mòr Ostaig on Skye.

Ainmean-Àite na h-Alba research and agree on place names, using local knowledge, historical sources and the principles of the Gaelic Orthographic Conventions. These names are used by local councils, roads authorities and the Ordnance Survey for signs and maps. A National Place-Names Database containing over 3,000 entries was launched in August 2010.

== History ==
Ainmean-Àite na h-Alba began as the Gaelic Names Liaison Committee, established in 2000 by the Ordnance Survey to improve consistency in Gaelic names on their mapping products. The committee expanded to become the Ainmean-Àite na h-Alba partnership in 2006.

Ainmean-Àite na h-Alba works in partnership with Argyll and Bute Council, Bòrd na Gàidhlig, Comhairle nan Eilean Siar, Highlands and Islands Enterprise, Historic Environment Scotland, Ordnance Survey, Scottish Natural Heritage, the Scottish Place-Name Society, Highland Council, the Scottish Government, the Scottish Parliament, and the University of the Highlands and Islands.
