= Rugini =

Ancient pagan tribe

The Rugini were a pagan tribe living in or near present day northern Germany in the 9th century. They were only mentioned once, in a list of pagan tribes drawn up by the English monk Bede (also called Beda venerabilis) in his Historia ecclesiastica of the early 8th century:

In a passage about Ecgberht of Ripon, who died in 729, he mentioned that these peoples were examples of pagan peoples who the English christians could help convert to Christiantity. Noting that the English were descended from them:

quarum in Germania plurimas noverat esse nationes, & quibus Angli vel Saxones qui nunc Brittaniam incolunt, genus et originem duxisse noscuntur ;	He knew that in Germania there were very many such nations, from whom the Anglo Saxons, who now inhabit Britain, are known to have drawn their race and origin.
unde hactenus a vicina gente Brettonum corrupte Garmani nuncupantur.	Hence even to this day they are corruptly called “Garmani” by the neighboring nation of the Britons.
Sunt autem Fresones, Rugini, Danai , Hunni, Antiqui Saxones, Boructuari: sunt alii perplures eisdem in partibus populi paganis adhuc ritibus servientes	Among these nations are the Frisians, Rugini, Danes, Huns, Old Saxons, and Boructuari; and there are many other peoples in those same parts still serving pagan rites.

Whether the Rugini were remnants of Roman-era Rugii, or living in or near one of the two regions the Romans reported them is unknown.

The term Rugini has also been interpreted as the first mention of the Slavic Rani (also Rujani), who in the Middle Ages dwelled on the isle of Rügen.

== See also ==
- Early history of Pomerania
