= List of river name etymologies =

This article lists the various etymologies (origins) of the names of rivers around the world.

== Africa ==
- Apies: from Afrikaans meaning "little apes".
- Berg: from Afrikaans meaning "mountain".
- Blood: from the Battle of Blood River, where 600 voortrekkers fought off 20,000 attacking Zulu troops. No voortrekkers were killed, but the dead Zulus (3,000 died) stained the nearby river with blood, and so the name stayed.
- Breede: from Afrikaans meaning "wide".
- Escravos: from Portuguese meaning "slaves".
- Forcados: from Portuguese meaning "forked".
- Gamtoos: probably derived from a Khoikhoi clan whose name was given by early Dutch settlers as "Gamtousch".
- Komati: from siSwati meaning "cow".
- Liesbeek: named after a small river in the Netherlands.
- Modder: from Afrikaans meaning "mud".
- Mooi River (KwaZulu-Natal) and Mooi River (Vaal): from Afrikaans meaning "beautiful".
- Niger: from the Tuareg phrase gher n gheren meaning "river of rivers", shortened to ngher.
- Nile: from Greek Neilos (Νεῖλος), sometimes derived from the Semitic Nahal "river."
- Nossob: from Khoikhoi meaning "black river".
- Ohlanga: from Zulu meaning "reed".
- Olifants: from Afrikaans meaning "elephants".
- Omi Osun: from Yoruba meaning "waters of the spirit-goddess Ọṣun".
- Orange: from Afrikaans "Oranje", meaning Orange, which was named after William V, Prince of Orange.
- Palala: from Sotho meaning "one that inundates".
- Vaal: from Afrikaans meaning "dull".

== Antarctica ==
- Alph River: name is from the opening passage in Samuel Taylor Coleridge's poem, Kubla Khan
- Onyx River: so named, not from the semi-precious stone, but from the "juxtaposition of the letters O, N, Y and X” according to New Zealand explorer Colin Bull

== Asia ==
- Amur: Mongolian "rest"
- Angara: Buryat angarkhai "the mouth of a wild beast"
- Aravand-rud: Persian "fast river"
- Brahmaputra: Sanskrit "son of Brahma"
- Chao Phraya: Thai เจ้าพระยา "king(s)"
- Dongjiang: Chinese "east river" (東江)
- Ganges: Sanskrit Ganga roughly "swift mover"
- Indus River: Sanskrit Sindhu generically means "river, stream, ocean"
- Jordan River: Hebrew Yarden, Arabic Urdunn from the root .י.ר.ד / وَرَدَ meaning "to go down".
- Mekong: Khmer: មេគង្គ Mékôngk. មេ /mee/me/ means mother and គង្គ /kʊəŋkeaʔ/Kong/ means Ganga.
- Ob: Komi "snow, snowdrift, place of snow"
- Pearl River: from Chinese 珠江 (Mandarin: Zhu Jiang; Cantonese: Zyü Gong) named after a sandy or stony island in the middle of the river called "Sea Pearl" (now reduced to a bank in the river)
- Sefid-rud: Persian "White river"
- Selenge: Mongolian "for swimming"
- Tigris River: Sumerian "running water"
- Wang Thong: From Thai วังทอง, "Gold Palace"
- Chang Jiang: Chinese "long river" (長江), from jiang 江 (Old Chinese: kˁrong), argued to be from earlier Proto-Austroasiatic *krung "river"?
- Yellow River (Huang He): Chinese "yellow river" (黄河), from he 河 (Old Chinese: ɡˁaj), "river"

== Europe ==
- Aboño: from Celtic *abon- "river": OIr. ab, aub, MW afon, MBret auon, (PIE: *h_{2}ep-h_{3}on- "river").
- Argeş: from Greek or maybe Thracian arges = "bright"
- Avon: from Celtic *abon- "river": OIr. ab, aub, MW afon, MBret auon, (PIE: *h_{2}ep-h_{3}on- "river").
- Avonbeg: Irish meaning "small river"
- Avonmore: Irish meaning "big river"
- Awbeg: Irish meaning "small river"
- Bistriţa: from Slavic bistra = "fast, quick"
- Bosna: likely from the Illyrian Bosona = "flowing water". Eponymous of Bosnia.
- Boyne: from Irish river goddess Boann, "white cow"
- Cam: from Celtic kambo "bend, cocked", Brythonic cam "crooked"
- Caraş: from Turkish kara = "black", "dark"
- Clanrye: Irish meaning "harbour of the king"
- Clwyd: Welsh meaning "hurdle"
- Danube: Latin Danuvius, Dacian: Donaris, from Iranian (Scythian or Sarmatian) dānu- "river", of Indo-European origin
- Dnipro: from Old Ukrainian Дънѣпръ (Dŭněprŭ), with further origins disputed
- Dvina: from Estonian väin, large and slowly flowing river
- Dobra: from Celtic *dubro "dark": MIr. dobur "black, unclean", MW dwfr "water", MBret. dour (PIE *deub^{h}-).
- Drave: in Latin Dravus, of Thracian or Illyrian origin, probably from PIE *dhreu = "to flow, to fall".
- Don (Aberdeenshire, Scotland): from Celtic Devona "goddess"
- Emajõgi: Estonian meaning "mother river"
- Erne: Irish after the name of the mythical princess, Éirne
- Foyle: Irish meaning "estuary of the lip"
- Guadalquivir: from Arabic wadi al-kabir, or "great river"
- Hayle: from Cornish Heyl "estuary"
- Ialomiţa: Slavic jalov "infertile"
- Kemijoki: from Old Finnish kemi, "meadowland"
- Kymijoki: from Old Finnish kymi = "huge river"
- Lagan: Irish meaning "river of the low-lying district"
- Llobregat: from Latin Rubricatus or "red river"
- Mersey: Anglo-Saxon meaning "boundary river"
- Narva: Veps after "rapid" or "falls"
- Prahova: Slavic prag = "waterfall" or prah = "dust"
- Quoile: Irish meaning "the narrow"
- Rhine: from the archaic German Rhine, which in turn comes from Middle High German: Rin, from the Proto-Indo-European root *reie- ("to flow, run").
  - The Reno in Italy shares the same etymology.
- Senne: Latin Senna from an old Indo-European root *sn-, meaning “flowing” or “streaming river.”
- Severn: Latin Sabrina from an Old British river goddess of that name, becoming Hafren in modern Welsh
- Shannon: Irish Sionann, name of a river goddess, Old Irish Sinann, from sen "old, ancient"
- Siret: from ancient Thracian Seretos, probably from PIE *sreu = "to flow"
- Slaney: Irish meaning "river of health"
- Tay: Celtic river goddess Tawa (Tava, Tatha, "the silent one")
- Tambre: From Tamaris with the same root that Tamar.
- Thames: Latin Tamesis from Brythonic meaning "dark river"
  - The Thame and Tamar, and probably the three rivers called Tame, have a similar etymological root
- Tyne: Brythonic meaning "river"
- Torne: After a watchtower (tornet in Swedish, torni in Finnish) at the river mouth where the town Tornio is today.
- Tagus: Old Indo-European *(s)tag- ("to drip", "to flow slowly").
- Volga: Slavic влага vlaga, волога vologa meaning "wetness", "humidity"; alternatively, Proto-Uralic *valki- "white"; alternatively, Russian velikij "great"
- Wear: Brythonic meaning "water"

== North America ==
- Athabasca: From the Woods Cree word aðapaskāw, "[where] there are plants one after another".
- Bow: After the reeds growing along its banks, which were used by the local Indians to make bows.
- Brazos: From the Spanish Los Brazos de Dios, or "the arms of God". There are several different explanations for the name, all involving it being the first water to be found by desperately thirsty parties.
- Canadian River: The etymology is unclear. The name may have come from French-Canadian traders and hunters who traveled along the river, or early explorers may have thought that the river flowed into Canada.
- Chattahoochee: from Creek cato hocce (IPA: [tʃató hóːtʃːi]) "marked rock".
- Colorado: Spanish for "red-colored; reddish."
- Columbia: Named for Captain Robert Gray's ship Columbia Rediviva, the first to travel up the river.
- Cumberland: Named for Prince William Augustus, Duke of Cumberland.
- Delaware: After the Bay, named for Thomas West, Baron De la Warre, first English colonial governor of Virginia.
- Fraser: Named for Simon Fraser, who confirmed it was a separate river from the Columbia.
- Hackensack: probably from Unami Delaware ahkinkèshaki, "place of sharp ground".
- Hiwassee: from the Cherokee meaning "stone wall", or from an Eastern Algonquian language meaning "beyond the hill" (e.g., Abenaki awasadenek).
- Hudson: named for Henry Hudson, an Englishman sailing for the Netherlands, who explored it in 1609.
- Loup: French for "wolf", after the Pawnee "wolf people" (Skidi band).
- Mackenzie: After Alexander MacKenzie, the Scots-Canadian explorer.
- Mississagi: Ojibwe misi-zaagi, "river with a wide mouth".
- Mississippi: Ojibwe misi-ziibi, "big river".
- Missouri: Named for the Missouri Indians, who lived along the banks. Their name comes from the Illinois mihsoori, meaning "dugout canoe".
- Nelson: Named for Robert Nelson, a ship's master who died at the mouth of the river in 1612.
- Ottawa: Named for the Ottawa people, a community of the Algonquian nation, who lived along the river until 1685.
- Peace: After Peace Point, the location of the ratification of the Treaty of the Peace.
- Platte: French Rivière Plate ("Flat River"), a calque of the Chiwere name ñįbraske ("flattened water").
- Potomac: From the Patowamek tribe noted by Captain John Smith.
- Republican: Named for the Pawnee band known as "the Republicans".
- Rio Grande: Spanish for "big river".
- Saint-Laurent: French for Saint Lawrence.
- Saskatchewan: From the Cree term Cree kisiskāciwani-sīpiy, meaning "swift flowing river".
- Schuylkill: from the Dutch schuil and kil, meaning "hidden river".
- Snake River: Derived from an S-shaped gesture the Shoshone made with their hands to represent swimming salmon. Explorers misinterpreted it to represent a snake, giving the river its present-day name.
- Stanislaus: named after Estanislao
- Susquehanna: Named after the Susquehannock Indians, whose name derives from an Algonquian word meaning "people at the falls", "roily water people", or "muddy current".
- Tennessee: Named for the Cherokee town of Tanasi, whose etymology is unknown.
- Wabash: English spelling of French Ouabache, from Miami-Illinois waapaahšiiki, "it shines white".
- Yukon: from an Athabaskan language (e.g., Koyukon yookkene, Lower Tanana yookuna).

== Oceania ==
=== Australia ===
- Alligator: named by the explorer King who misidentified the crocodiles in the river
- Barwon (New South Wales): Ngiyampaa paawan, meaning "river"
- Barwon (Victoria): after Woiwurrung barrawan, "magpie"
- Bass: for explorer George Bass
- Bow: named by settler Michael Durack after the river of the same name in County Clare, Ireland
- Buckland: named after squatter Thomas Buckland
- Bunyip: Boonwurrung banib, "bunyip" (a frightening, massive monster which legendarily lived in bodies of water)
- Burnett: named by James Burnett, explorer
- Campaspe: named for Campaspe, a mistress of Alexander the Great
- Coliban: Djadjawarrung kailheban, "people of kaie-la"
- Cooper Creek: named for Charles Cooper, Chief Justice of South Australia 1856–1861
- Daintree: named for Richard Daintree, geologist
- Daly: named for Sir Dominick Daly, Governor of South Australia 1862–1868
- Darling: named for Sir Ralph Darling, Governor of New South Wales 1825–1831
- Diamantina: named for Lady Diamantina Bowen, wife of the first Governor of Queensland
- Delegate: Ngarigo dellegut, "(high) hill"
- Finke:named by explorer Stuart after colonial administrator William Finke
- Flinders: named for Captain Matthew Flinders, explorer
- Franklin: named for Sir John Franklin, Governor of Tasmania 1836–1843
- Gascoyne: named for Captain J. Gascoyne, friend of explorer Lieutenant George Grey
- Glenelg (Victoria): named after Colonial Secretary Charles Grant, 1st Baron Glenelg
- Glenelg (Western Australia): same as above
- Goulburn (New South Wales): named for Henry Goulburn, English statesman
- Goulburn (Victoria): named for Frederick Goulburn, colonial administrator
- Hawkesbury: named for Charles Jenkinson, 1st Earl of Liverpool (titled Baron Hawkesbury in 1789)
- King (Victoria): named after Governor King
- Lachlan: named for Major-General Lachlan Macquarie, Governor of New South Wales 1810–1821
- Latrobe: named for Charles La Trobe, Lieutenant Governor of Victoria
- Lerderderg: Djadjawurrung lahr- dedark, "stone house-peppermint gum"
- Loddon: named by Major Mitchell after the river of the same name in Berkshire, England
- Macquarie: named for Major-General Lachlan Macquarie, Governor of New South Wales 1810–1821
- Maribyrnong: Woiwurrung mirring-gnay-bir-nong, "(I) can hear a ring-tail possum"
- Mitchell: named after Major Mitchell, explorer
- Mitta Mitta: Yaitmathang mida-modoenga, "water (where) modunga reeds grow"
- Moorabool: Wadawurrung mooroobull, "ghost"
- Murray: named for Sir George Murray, then British Secretary of State for War and the Colonies
- Murrumbidgee: from Wiradjuri mirrambidya, "big water"
- Onkaparinga: from the Kaurna Ngangkiparingga, "at the place of the women's river"
- Ord: named for Harry Ord, Governor of Western Australia 1877–1880
- Ovens: named for colonial administrator John Ovens
- Rubicon (Victoria): after the Italian river famous in classical history
- Torrens: named for Colonel Robert Torrens, chairman of South Australia's colonising commission
- Rufus: named by explorer Charles Sturt for the nickname of his travelling companion (Rufus), the red-haired George Macleay
- Tambo: Ngarigo dambo, "fish"
- Tarwin: Boonwurrung darwhin, "thirsty"
- Todd: named for Charles Todd, Postmaster-General of South Australia 1870–1901
- Wannon: Jarwadjali wanna, "digging implement"
- Werribee: Wathaurong weariby, "backbone"
- Wimmera:Jarwadjali wamara, possibly cognate with woomera, "throwing-stick"
- Woady Yaloak: Wathaurong wurdi-yaluk, "big water"
- Yarra: mistranslation from Wurundjeri term yarra yarra "falling/flowing water"

=== New Zealand ===
- Manawatū River: from Māori, meaning "heart stood still" or "heart stumble"
- Rakaia River: from Māori, meaning the place where people were arranged by ranks
- Taieri: from Māori Taiari, "spring tide" or "shiny water"
- Waikato River: from Māori, meaning "flowing water".
- Waimakariri River: from Māori, meaning "cold water"
- Whanganui; from Māori, meaning "big harbour"

== South America ==
- Amazon River: Derived from Greek, after the Amazons, or from Tupi Amassona, meaning "boat destroyer"
- Río Calle-Calle: Derived from Mapudungun for the plant Libertia chilensis
- Río Cochrane: after Lord Cochrane who served in the Chilean Navy
- Río Futaleufú: Mapudungun for "big river"
- Río Ibañez: after Carlos Ibáñez del Campo former president of Chile
- Río Imperial: after the old city of Carahue, formerly known as Imperial.
- Orinoco: derived from the Warao term for "a place to paddle", itself derived from the terms güiri ("paddle") and noko ("place") i.e. a navigable place.
- Paraná River: Guarani "Copious River"
- Río de la Plata: Spanish for "Silver River"
- Rio Roosevelt (sometimes Rio Teodoro): after Theodore Roosevelt
- Río Valdivia: after the Spanish conquistador of Chile Pedro de Valdivia

== See also ==
- Hydronymy
- Lists of etymologies
- Toponomy

== Bibliography ==
- Bright, William (2004). Native American Place Names of the United States. Norman: University of Oklahoma Press
- Blažek, Václav, and Ondřej Šefčík. "Oronyms Derived from Water? Mons Abnobae and Haraitī". Historische Sprachforschung [Historical Linguistics] 124 (2011): 239–49. http://www.jstor.org/stable/41553574.
- Hamp, Eric P. ""Water" in Italic and Keltic". In: Etudes Celtiques, vol. 12, fascicule 2, 1970. pp. 547–550. DOI: https://doi.org/10.3406/ecelt.1970.1436 ; www.persee.fr/doc/ecelt_0373-1928_1970_num_12_2_1436
