= Hydronym =

Proper name of a body of water

A hydronym (from Greek: ὕδρω, hydrō, "water" and ὄνομα, onoma, "name") is a type of toponym that designates a proper name of a body of water. Hydronyms include the proper names of rivers and streams, lakes and ponds, swamps and marshes, seas and oceans. For example, the hydronym for the easternmost lake of the Great Lakes is Lake Ontario. As a subset of toponymy, a distinctive discipline of hydronymy (or hydronomastics) studies the proper names of all bodies of water, the origins and meanings of those names, and their development and transmission through history.

Hydronym Iteru ("great river") written in hieroglyphs, designating the river Nile in the Egyptian language

== Classification by water types ==
Within the onomastic classification, main types of hydronyms are (in alphabetical order):

- helonyms: proper names of swamps, marshes and bogs
- limnonyms: proper names of lakes and ponds
- oceanonyms: proper names of oceans
- potamonyms: proper names of rivers and streams
- thalassonyms or, less commonly, pelagonyms: proper names of seas and maritime bays

== Linguistic phenomena ==
Often, a given body of water will have several entirely different names given to it by different peoples living along its shores. For example, Tibetan: རྫ་ཆུ, Wylie: rDza chu, ZWPY: Za qu and Thai: แม่น้ำโขง [mɛ̂ː náːm kʰǒːŋ] are the Tibetan and Thai names, respectively, for the same river, the Mekong in southeast Asia. (The Tibetan name is used for three other rivers as well.)

Hydronyms from various languages may all share a common etymology. For example, the Danube, Don, Dniester, Dnieper, and Donets rivers all contain the Scythian name for "river" (cf. don, "river, water" in modern Ossetic). A similar suggestion is that the Yarden, Yarkon, and Yarmouk (and possibly, with distortion, Yabbok and/or Arnon) rivers in the Israel/Jordan area contain the Egyptian word for river (itrw, transliterated in the Bible as ye'or).

It is also possible for a toponym to become a hydronym: for example, the River Liffey takes its name from the plain on which it stands, called Liphe or Life; the river originally was called An Ruirthech. An unusual example is the River Cam, which originally was called the Granta, but when the town of Grantebrycge became Cambridge, the river's name changed to match the toponym. Another unusual example is the River Stort which is named after the town on the ford Bishops Stortford rather than the town being named after the river.

== Relation to history ==
Compared to most other toponyms, hydronyms are very conservative linguistically, and people who move to an area often retain the existing name of a body of water rather than rename it in their own language. For example, the Rhine in Germany bears a Celtic name, not a German name. The Mississippi River in the United States bears an Anishinaabe name, not a French or English one. The names of large rivers are even more conservative than the local names of small streams.

Therefore, hydronomy may be a tool used to reconstruct past cultural interactions, population movements, religious conversions, or older languages. For example, history professor Kenneth H. Jackson identified a river-name pattern against which to fit the story of the Anglo-Saxon invasion of Britain and pockets of surviving native British culture. His river map of Britain divided the island into three principal areas of English settlement: the river valleys draining eastward in which surviving British names are limited to the largest rivers and Saxon settlement was early and dense; the highland spine; and a third region whose British hydronyms apply even to the smaller streams.

Prime Minister Mark Carney of Canada raised the profile of the word in his response to an executive order by the American president. “We know that America is changing. Their trading relationships, their foreign policies, their national monuments, their hydronyms,” said Carney.

The word was subsequently used in promoting environmental protection of Lake Ontario, via tee shirts saying "My hydronyms are Lake and Ontario."

== See also ==
- Old European hydronymy
- Rigvedic rivers
- List of river name etymologies

== Sources ==
- Cassia, Margherita (2023). The Roman Empress Ulpia Severina: Ruler and Goddess.
- Beekes, Robert S. P. "River". Encyclopedia of Indo-European Culture. pp. 486–487.
- Leschhorn, Wolfgang; Miron, Auguste V. B.; Miron, Andrei (1996). Hellas und der griechische Osten.
- Matthews, Elaine (2007). Old and New Worlds in Greek Onomastics.
- Mencken, H. L. (1921). "3. Geographical Names". The American language: An inquiry into the development of English in the United States (2nd, rev. and enl. ed.). Archived from the original on 27 December 2017.
- Room, Adrian (1996). An Alphabetical Guide to the Language of Name Studies. Lanham and London: The Scarecrow Press. ISBN 978-0-8108-3169-8.
