= Society for Name Studies in Britain and Ireland =

The Society for Name Studies in Britain and Ireland (SNSBI) is a registered charity and a learned society of members with interests in proper names, including place-names, personal names, and surnames relating to the British Isles.

The SNSBI is the successor to the Council for Name Studies in Great Britain and Ireland, which was set up in the 1960s to bring together scholars who were working in the field of onomastics in the British Isles. As a result, the SNSBI was formally inaugurated in November 1991.

The SNSBI publishes the journal Nomina. It holds a day conference each autumn, as well as an annual weekend conference in spring. It has a website which provides details of past and future events, and of the articles in past issues of Nomina. The SNSBI awards an annual essay prize to a student or early-career researcher.

== See also ==
- Onomastics
- British toponymy
