= International Council of Onomastic Sciences =

Organisation for the scientific study of names

- logo of ICOS
- Established: 1949
- Chair: Staffan Nyström (2025)
- Website: http://www.icosweb.net

The International Council of Onomastic Sciences (ICOS) is an international academic organization of scholars with a special interest in onomastics, the scientific study of names (e.g. place-names, personal names, and proper names of all other kinds). The official languages of ICOS are English, French, and German.

== Work of the scholars of ICOS ==
Members research:

- the origin and history of names,
- the personal name-systems used by different cultures,
- the demographic patterns of names in different societies,
- the use and significance of names of characters in literature,
- brand-name creation,
- many related topics in the naming of persons, places, institutions, works of art, and other miscellaneous objects.

They are also involved in practical projects such as the international standardization of geographical names.

One of the aims of ICOS, unlike many national societies for name-study, is the advancement, representation and co-ordination of name-research on an international level and in an interdisciplinary context.

To achieve this goal, it is committed to the publication of research and the development of research tools. Thus, its members come from diverse disciplines such as linguistics, philology, history, sociology, anthropology, psychology, geography and literary research.

This organization replaced the former International Committee of Onomastic Sciences, which was composed exclusively of representatives of member countries and did not welcome individual researchers as this new structure allows.

== Onoma ==
ICOS publishes the annual journal Onoma, which is its official publication. Onoma is managed by a General Editor in conjunction with an Editorial Board. It contains topical research reports as well as basic theoretical articles concerning all areas of scholarly name research. ICOS also publishes an irregular newsletter. ISSN 0078-463X.

== Working groups ==
ICOS has two active working groups, striving:

1. to create an international bibliography of name-study
2. to help create an internationally agreed technical terminology for name-study

== Congresses ==
The International Congress of Onomastic Sciences, which is normally held every three years, is a major academic conference organised on behalf of ICOS by one of its members. The General Assembly of ICOS, which also functions as its business meeting, and at which its officers are elected, is usually held at these congresses. The ordinary business of ICOS is transacted by the elected board of directors.

Until the present, the following congresses have been run:

1. Paris, 1938
2. Paris, 1947
3. Bruxelles [Brussels], 1949
4. Uppsala, 1952
5. Salamanca, 1955
6. München [Munich], 1958
7. Firenze [Florence], 1961
8. Amsterdam, 1963
9. London, 1966
10. Wien [Vienna], 1969
11. Sofia, 1972
12. Bern, 1975
13. Kraków, 1978
14. Ann Arbor, 1981
15. Leipzig, 1984
16. Québec, 1987
17. Helsinki, 1990
18. Trier, 1993
19. Aberdeen, 1996
20. Santiago de Compostela, 1999
21. "ICOS – Proceedings of the 21st International Congress of Onomastic Sciences: Uppsala, 2002". sprakochfolkminnen.se. 15 September 2016. Archived from the original on 2 October 2018.
22. Pisa, 2005
23. York University, Toronto, 2008
24. Barcelona, 2011
25. Glasgow, 2014
26. Debrecen, 2017
27. Kraków, 2021 (postponed from 2020 due to the Covid-19 pandemic)
28. Helsinki, 2024

The proceedings of each congress are available at the ICOS website.

== Presidents ==
- Professor Hendrik Jozef van de Wijer (Leuven), 1950–1968
- Professor Henri Draye (Leuven), 1969-1983
- Professor Karel Roelandts (Leuven), 1984–1990
- Professor Wilhelm F.H. Nicolaisen (New York / Aberdeen), 1990–1996
- Professor Robert Rentenaar (Amsterdam), 1996–1999
- Professor Isolde Hausner (Vienna), 1999–2002
- Dr. Mats Wahlberg (Uppsala), 2002–2005
- Professor Maria Giovanna Arcamone (Pisa), 2005–2008
- Professor Sheila Embleton (Toronto), 2008–2011
- Professor Carole Hough (Glasgow), 2011–2014
- Dr. Milan Harvalík (Prague), 2014–2017
- Dr. Paula Sjöblom (Turku), 2017–2021
- Dr. Katalin Reszegi (Debrecen), 2021–2024

== See also ==
- American Name Society
