= Colin Robert Chase =

American academic (1935–1984)

Colin Chase
- Chase in 1980
- Born: Colin Robert Chase; February 5, 1935; Denver, Colorado, U.S.
- Died: October 13, 1984 (aged 49)
- Occupation: English professor
- Years active: 1971–1984
- Notable work: The Dating of Beowulf (1981); Two Alcuin Letter-Books (1975)
- Mother: Mary Chase

Colin Robert Chase (February 5, 1935 – October 13, 1984) was an American academic. An associate professor of English at the University of Toronto, he was known for his contributions to the studies of Old English and Anglo-Latin literature. His best-known work, The Dating of Beowulf, challenged the accepted orthodoxy of the dating of the Anglo-Saxon poem Beowulf—then thought to be from the latter half of the eighth century—and left behind what was described in A Beowulf Handbook as "a cautious and necessary incertitude".

Born in Denver, Chase was one of three sons of a newspaper executive and a Pulitzer Prize-winning playwright, Mary Coyle Chase. Chase's two brothers became actors; he considered such a career, but ultimately studied English literature, classics, and philosophy. He received his Bachelor of Arts from Harvard University, Master of Arts from Saint Louis and Johns Hopkins Universities, and Ph.D. from the University of Toronto in 1971, the same year the university named him an assistant professor.

In addition to The Dating of Beowulf, Chase penned Two Alcuin Letter-Books—a scholarly collection of twenty-four letters by the eighth-century scholar Alcuin. He also wrote some eight articles and chapters, contributed to the Dictionary of the Middle Ages, and for nearly a decade writing the Beowulf section of "This Year's Work in Old English Studies" for the Old English Newsletter. Chase died of cancer in 1984, shortly before his anticipated promotion to full professor.

== Early life and education ==
Colin Robert Chase was born in Denver, Colorado, on February 5, 1935. His father, Robert Lamont Chase, was a newspaper executive, and his mother, Mary Coyle Chase, a playwright who went on to win the Pulitzer Prize for Drama in 1945 for her play, Harvey. Colin Chase had two brothers, Michael Lamont Chase and Barry Jerome "Jerry" Chase. All three pursued an interest in acting. Michael Chase attended the Carnegie Institute of Technology School of Drama, and was a member of the cast of the Barter Theatre in Abingdon, Virginia. Jerry Chase acted in plays and movies, including one of his mother's plays when 14 years old, and wrote the play Cinderella Wore Combat Boots. Colin Chase, meanwhile, nearly pursued an acting career, and would later perform in campus stage productions.

Chase grew up in Denver, where he attended Teller Elementary School. The success of his mother's play Harvey led to some bullying in fourth grade, leading his mother to write a guest column about it in the Dunkirk Evening Observer. He graduated from the Taft School in Watertown Connecticut in 1952. He obtained his Bachelor of Arts from Harvard University in 1956, and studied classics and philosophy for five years at a Jesuit seminary. In 1962 he received a Master of Arts from Saint Louis University, and in 1964 he received a second master's degree from Johns Hopkins University; he matriculated at the University of Toronto the same year, became a part-time instructor there in 1967, and completed his Ph.D. in 1971. His dissertation was entitled Panel Structure in Old English Poetry.

== Career ==
Chase became an assistant professor at the University of Toronto in 1971, the same year he completed his PhD. Four years later he was promoted to associate professor. At the university he taught a wide variety of classes and had many doctoral students. He was a faculty member of St. Michael's College and the Centre for Medieval Studies; from 1977 until 1984, he chaired the centre's Medieval Latin Committee.

Much of Chase's work was on Old English and Anglo-Latin literature, and he focused his research on the pre-conquest literature of England. He was particularly known for his 1981 edited collection The Dating of Beowulf, and from 1976 served as the chief reviewer of the Beowulf section of "The Year's Work in Old English Studies" in the Old English Newsletter. Chase's other major publication was a 1975 scholarly edition of Two Alcuin Letter-Books, which collected twenty-four letters written by the eighth-century scholar Alcuin. Collected for Wulfstan, Archbishop of York, two centuries after Alcuin's death, the letters were preserved in a manuscript from the Cotton collection at the British Library, and many were apparently intended as didactic messages rather than personal correspondence; others were "model letters" including 'thank you' notes and 'get well' cards, likely to help students learn how to compose letters in Latin. Chase also wrote eight articles, and contributed to three videos made by the Toronto Media Centre, most popularly The Sutton Hoo ship-burial, about the Anglo-Saxon ship-burial unearthed at Sutton Hoo in Suffolk. He additionally served as an administrative committee member at the early stages of the project to revise Jack Ogilvy's Books Known to the English and create a reference work mapping the sources that influenced the literary culture of Anglo-Saxon England.

The Dating of Beowulf was credited with challenging the accepted orthodoxy over the date that the epic poem was composed. The Old English poem, surviving in a single manuscript from the turn of the millennium, attracted considerable interest after its first modern publication in 1815, and spawned what was termed in A Beowulf Handbook as a "bewildering debate about perhaps the most vexing problems in Beowulf scholarship: when was the poem composed, where, by whom, for whom?" Chase's introduction, "Opinions on the Date of Beowulf, 1815–1980"—which one reviewer termed "an essay commendable both for its balance and its economy"—traced a century and a half of academic discourse over the first of these questions, which, having started with a first tentative date of the poem of shortly after the fourth century, had by 1980 consistently settled on a date in the latter half of the eighth century. Each chapter used a different approach, such as historical, metrical, stylistic, and codicological, to try to date the poem.

Chase's attempt at dating looked at the poem's balanced attitude towards heroic culture, reflecting both appreciation and admonition, to suggest that "Beowulf was written at a time when heroic culture could be treated fully and positively but without romanticizing, by an author neither afraid nor infatuated." Given the paucity of material with which to trace the evolution of historical perspectives, Chase turned to the better-known lives of the saints from the period. Seeing early lives which appeared "to avoid and even suppress significant exploitation" of heroic culture and values, and later lives that moved "towards a celebration of heroic values in a way that has been fully integrated with Anglo-Saxon culture", Chase suggested that "Beowulf is likely to have been written neither early, in the eighth century, nor late, in the tenth, but in the rapidly changing and chaotic ninth". Other chapters, meanwhile, by scholars such as Peter Clemoes and Kevin Kiernan, suggested a date for the poem as early as the eighth century, and as late as the eleventh. In the book's wake came what was described in A Beowulf Handbook as "a cautious and necessary incertitude". An anonymous reviewer of the book termed it "one of the most important inconclusions in the study of Old English", and declared that "henceforth every discussion of the poem and its period will begin with reference to this volume."

Chase died in 1984, while his promotion to full professor was underway. At the time he was working on a study of the lives of the saints and had started a new series of editions of the lives of the pre-conquest saints. The scholar Paul E. Szarmach wrote that Chase "taught us much by his scholarship and by his personal example, and we are in great measure diminished". The Centre for Medieval Studies at the University of Toronto, matched by the Ontario Student Opportunity Trust Fund, awards the Colin Chase Memorial Bursary each year in Chase's memory. The scholarship goes to "a graduate student in the Centre for Medieval Studies, on the basis of academic excellence and financial need".

== Personal life and death ==
Chase had a wife, Joyce (née Breitbach), and five children: Deirdre, Robert, Tim, Mary, and Patrick. He was a deacon in the Roman Catholic Church, and participated in its training program. He died of cancer in 1984. His wife died in 2003, also of cancer.

== Publications ==
=== Books ===
- Chase, Colin (1971). Panel Structure in Old English Poetry (PhD). Toronto: University of Toronto. ProQuest 302621579.
- Chase, Colin, ed. (1975). Two Alcuin Letter-Books. Toronto Medieval Latin Texts. Vol. 5. Toronto: Pontifical Institute of Mediaeval Studies. ISBN 0-88844-454-0.
- Chase, Colin, ed. (1981). The Dating of Beowulf. Toronto Old English Series. Vol. 6. Toronto: University of Toronto Press. ISBN 0-8020-7879-6. JSTOR 10.3138/j.ctt1287v33.

- Includes two chapters written by Chase:

- Chase, Colin. "Opinions on the Date of Beowulf, 1815–1980". The Dating of Beowulf. pp. 3–8. JSTOR 10.3138/j.ctt1287v33.5.
- Chase, Colin. "Saints' Lives, Royal Lives, and the Date of Beowulf". The Dating of Beowulf. pp. 161–172. JSTOR 10.3138/j.ctt1287v33.15.

=== Chapters ===
- Chase, Colin (1981). "Alcuin's Grammar Verse: Poetry and Truth in Carolingian Pedagogy". In Herren, Michael W. (ed.). Insular Latin Studies: Papers on Latin Texts and Manuscripts of the British Isles: 550–1066. Papers in Mediaeval Studies. Vol. 1. Toronto: Pontifical Institute of Mediaeval Studies. pp. 135–152. ISBN 0-88844-801-5.
- Chase, Colin (1983). "The Age of Ælfric". In Szarmach, Paul E. (ed.). Anglo-Latin in the Context of Old English Literature. Old English Newsletter Subsidia. Vol. 9. Binghamton, New York: Center for Medieval and Early Renaissance Studies, State University of New York at Binghamton. pp. 17–24. ISSN 0739-8549.

- Abstract published as Chase, Colin (Spring 1983). "Anglo-Latin in the Context of Old English Literature: the Age of Ælfric" (PDF). Old English Newsletter. 16 (2). Binghamton, New York: Center for Medieval and Early Renaissance Studies, State University of New York at Binghamton: 51. ISSN 0030-1973.

- Chase, Colin (1985). "Beowulf, Bede, and St. Oswine: The Hero's Pride in Old English Hagiography". In Woods, J. Douglas & Pelteret, David A. E. (eds.). The Anglo-Saxons: Synthesis and Achievement. Waterloo: Wilfrid Laurier University Press. pp. 37–48. ISBN 0-88920-166-8.
- Chase, Colin (1986). "Source Study as a Trick with Mirrors: Annihilation of Meaning in the Old English "Mary of Egypt"". In Szarmach, Paul Edward & Oggins, Virginia Darrow (eds.). Sources of Anglo-Saxon Culture. Studies in Medieval Culture. Vol. 20. Kalamazoo, Michigan: Medieval Institute Publications. pp. 23–33. ISBN 0-918720-67-2.

- Republished as Chase, Colin (2000). "Beowulf, Bede, and St. Oswine: The Hero's Pride in Old English Hagiography". In Baker, Peter S. (ed.). The Beowulf Reader. Basic Readings in Anglo-Saxon England. Vol. 1. New York: Routledge. pp. 181–194. ISBN 0-8153-3666-7.

=== Articles ===
- Chase, Colin (December 1974). "God's Presence Through Grace as the Theme of Cynewulf's Christ II and the Relationship of this Theme to Christ I and Christ III". Anglo-Saxon England. 3. London: Cambridge University Press: 87–101. doi:10.1017/S0263675100000600. S2CID 162472640.
- Chase, Colin (Spring 1981). "Background for Nostalgia in the Hagiography of Late Anglo-Saxon England" (PDF). Old English Newsletter. 14 (2). Binghamton, New York: Center for Medieval and Early Renaissance Studies, State University of New York at Binghamton: 30–31. ISSN 0030-1973.
- Chase, Colin (Spring 1983). "Mary of Egypt and the Seven Holy Sleepers: A Methodological Inquiry" (PDF). Old English Newsletter. 16 (2). Binghamton, New York: Center for Medieval and Early Renaissance Studies, State University of New York at Binghamton: 66. ISSN 0030-1973.
- Chase, Colin (Spring 1984). "The Yellow Brick Road to St. Anthony and St. Guthlac: or 'You Can't Get There from Here'" (PDF). Old English Newsletter. 17 (2). Binghamton, New York: Center for Medieval and Early Renaissance Studies, State University of New York at Binghamton: A-35 – A-36. ISSN 0030-1973.

=== Reviews ===
- Chase, Colin (November 1976). "Review of Ingeld and Christ: Heroic Concepts and Values in Old English Christian Poetry, by Michael D. Cherniss". The Review of English Studies. XXVII (108). Oxford: Clarendon Press: 448–450. doi:10.1093/res/XXVII.108.448. JSTOR 513799.
- Chase, Colin (Summer 1980). "Review of The Early Charters of the Thames Valley, by Margaret Gellin". Albion. 12 (2). Boone, North Carolina: Appalachian State University Department of History: 175–176. doi:10.2307/4048817. JSTOR 4048817.
- Chase, Colin (Winter 1983). "Review of Alcuin: The Bishops, Kings, and Saints of York, edited by Peter Godman". Albion. New Series. 15 (4). Boone, North Carolina: Appalachian State University Department of History: 343–344. doi:10.2307/4049139. JSTOR 4049139.
- Chase, Colin (July 1985). "Review of The Old English Elegies: New Essays in Criticism and Research, edited by Martin Green". Speculum. 60 (3). Cambridge, Massachusetts: The Medieval Academy of America: 680–682. doi:10.2307/2848198. JSTOR 2848198.

=== Other ===
This Year's Work in Old English Studies

- Chase, Colin (Fall 1976). "This Year's Work in Old English Studies – 1975: Beowulf" (PDF). Old English Newsletter. X (1). Binghamton, New York: Center for Medieval and Early Renaissance Studies, State University of New York at Binghamton: 59–63. ISSN 0030-1973.
- Chase, Colin (Fall 1977). "This Year's Work in Old English Studies – 1976: Beowulf" (PDF). Old English Newsletter. XI (1). Binghamton, New York: Center for Medieval and Early Renaissance Studies, State University of New York at Binghamton: 54–59. ISSN 0030-1973.
- Chase, Colin (Fall 1978). "This Year's Work in Old English Studies – 1977: Beowulf" (PDF). Old English Newsletter. XII (1). Binghamton, New York: Center for Medieval and Early Renaissance Studies, State University of New York at Binghamton: 54–60. ISSN 0030-1973.
- Chase, Colin (Fall 1979). "This Year's Work in Old English Studies – 1978: Beowulf" (PDF). Old English Newsletter. XIII (1). Binghamton, New York: Center for Medieval and Early Renaissance Studies, State University of New York at Binghamton: 44–48. ISSN 0030-1973.
- Chase, Colin (Fall 1980). "This Year's Work in Old English Studies – 1979: Beowulf" (PDF). Old English Newsletter. XIV (1). Binghamton, New York: Center for Medieval and Early Renaissance Studies, State University of New York at Binghamton: 48–52. ISSN 0030-1973.
- Chase, Colin (Fall 1981). "This Year's Work in Old English Studies – 1980: Beowulf" (PDF). Old English Newsletter. XV (1). Binghamton, New York: Center for Medieval and Early Renaissance Studies, State University of New York at Binghamton: 95–101. ISSN 0030-1973.
- Chase, Colin (Fall 1982). "This Year's Work in Old English Studies – 1981: Beowulf" (PDF). Old English Newsletter. XVI (1). Binghamton, New York: Center for Medieval and Early Renaissance Studies, State University of New York at Binghamton: 69–79. ISSN 0030-1973.
- Chase, Colin (Fall 1983). "This Year's Work in Old English Studies – 1982: Beowulf" (PDF). Old English Newsletter. XVII (1). Binghamton, New York: Center for Medieval and Early Renaissance Studies, State University of New York at Binghamton: 82–92. ISSN 0030-1973.
- Chase, Colin & Taylor, Andrew (Fall 1984). "This Year's Work in Old English Studies – 1983: Beowulf" (PDF). Old English Newsletter. XVIII (1). Binghamton, New York: Center for Medieval and Early Renaissance Studies, State University of New York at Binghamton: 89–97. ISSN 0030-1973.

Dictionary of the Middle Ages

- Chase, Colin (1982). "Acrostics–Wordplay". In Strayer, Joseph R. (ed.). Dictionary of the Middle Ages. Vol. 1. New York City: Charles Scribner's Sons. pp. 45–46. ISBN 0-684-16760-3.
- Chase, Colin (1982). "Alfred the Great". In Strayer, Joseph R. (ed.). Dictionary of the Middle Ages. Vol. 1. New York City: Charles Scribner's Sons. pp. 163–164. ISBN 0-684-16760-3.
- Chase, Colin (1982). "Alfred the Great and Translations". In Strayer, Joseph R. (ed.). Dictionary of the Middle Ages. Vol. 1. New York City: Charles Scribner's Sons. pp. 164–167. ISBN 0-684-16760-3.
- Chase, Colin (1982). "Anglo-Latin Poetry". In Strayer, Joseph R. (ed.). Dictionary of the Middle Ages. Vol. 1. New York City: Charles Scribner's Sons. pp. 254–255. ISBN 0-684-16760-3.
- Chase, Colin (1983). "Beowulf". In Strayer, Joseph R. (ed.). Dictionary of the Middle Ages. Vol. 2. New York City: Charles Scribner's Sons. pp. 182–185. ISBN 0-684-17022-1.
- Chase, Colin (1983). "Carolingian Latin Poetry". In Strayer, Joseph R. (ed.). Dictionary of the Middle Ages. Vol. 3. New York City: Charles Scribner's Sons. pp. 99–103. ISBN 0-684-17023-X.
- Chase, Colin (1985). "Frithegod". In Strayer, Joseph R. (ed.). Dictionary of the Middle Ages. Vol. 5. New York City: Charles Scribner's Sons. p. 302. ISBN 0-684-18161-4.
- Chase, Colin (1987). "Modoin". In Strayer, Joseph R. (ed.). Dictionary of the Middle Ages. Vol. 8. New York City: Charles Scribner's Sons. p. 451. ISBN 0-684-18274-2.
- Chase, Colin (1987). "Paul the Deacon". In Strayer, Joseph R. (ed.). Dictionary of the Middle Ages. Vol. 9. New York City: Charles Scribner's Sons. pp. 467–468. ISBN 0-684-18275-0.

== Bibliography ==
- Biggs, Frederick M.; Hill, Thomas D. & Szarmach, Paul E., eds. (1990). Sources of Anglo-Saxon Literary Culture: A Trial Version. Medieval & Renaissance Texts & Studies. Vol. 74. Binghamton, New York: Center for Medieval and Early Renaissance Studies, State University of New York at Binghamton. doi:10.17613/dcmy-w573. ISBN 0-86698-084-9.
- Bjork, Robert E. & Obermeier, Anita (November 1997). "Date, Provenance, Author, Audiences". In Bjork, Robert E. & Niles, John D. (eds.). A Beowulf Handbook. Lincoln, Nebraska: University of Nebraska Press. pp. 13–34. ISBN 0-8032-1237-2.
- Frank, Roberta (October 2007). "A Scandal in Toronto: The Dating of 'Beowulf' a Quarter Century On". Speculum. 82 (4). Cambridge, Massachusetts: Medieval Academy of America: 843–864. doi:10.1017/S0038713400011313. JSTOR 20466079. S2CID 162726731.
- Garfagnini, Gian Carlo (1978). "Review of Three Lives of English Saints, edited by Michael Winterbottom, of The Gospel of Nichodemus: Gesta Salvatoris, edited by Hack Chin Kim, of Peter the Venerable: Selected Letters, edited by Janet Martin, and of Two Alcuin Letter-Books, edited by Colin Chase". Annali della Scuola Normale Superiore di Pisa. Classe di Lettere e Filosofia. VIII (4). Pisa: Scuola Normale & University of Pisa: 1720–1723. JSTOR 24303321.
- Godman, Peter (1976). "Review of Two Alcuin Letter-Books, edited by Colin Chase". Medium Ævum. XLV (3). Oxford: Society for the Study of Mediæval Languages and Literature: 294–296. doi:10.2307/43628227. JSTOR 43628227.
- Jacobs, Nicolas (1984). "Review of The Dating of Beowulf, edited by Colin Chase". Medium Ævum. LIII (1). Oxford: Society for the Study of Mediæval Languages and Literature: 117–120. doi:10.2307/43628801. JSTOR 43628801.
- Szarmach, Paul Edward (1986). "Foreword". In Szarmach, Paul Edward & Oggins, Virginia Darrow (eds.). Sources of Anglo-Saxon Culture. Studies in Medieval Culture. Vol. 20. Kalamazoo, Michigan: Medieval Institute Publications. pp. vii–xii. ISBN 0-918720-67-2.
- Trahern, Joseph B. Jr. (January 1984). "Review of The Dating of Beowulf, edited by Colin Chase, and of Beowulf and the Beowulf Manuscript, by Kevin S. Kiernan". Journal of English and Germanic Philology. LXXXIII (1). Champaign, Illinois: University of Illinois Press: 107–112. ISSN 0363-6941. JSTOR 27709285.
