= Battle of Brunanburh (poem) =

Old English poem

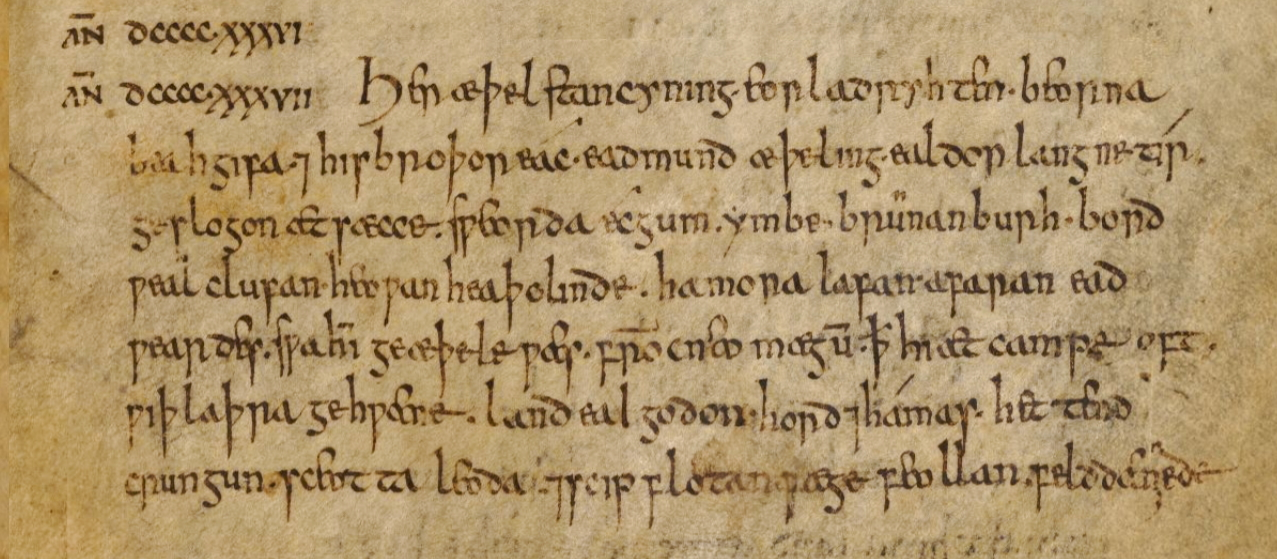
The beginning of the poem in MS A of the Anglo-Saxon Chronicle (f. 26r)

The "Battle of Brunanburh" is an Old English poem. It is preserved in the Anglo-Saxon Chronicle, a historical record of events in Anglo-Saxon England which was kept from the late ninth to the mid-twelfth century. The poem records the Battle of Brunanburh, a battle fought in 937 between an English army and a combined army of Scots, Vikings, and Britons. The battle resulted in an English victory, celebrated by the poem in style and language like that of traditional Old English battle poetry. The poem is notable because of those traditional elements and has been praised for its authentic tone, but it is also remarkable for its fiercely nationalistic tone, which documents the development of a unified England ruled by the House of Wessex.

== Historical background ==
The Battle of Brunanburh (Note: The location of the battle is not established. Kemp Malone, in an article that discussed the textual variants of the name and its etymology, concludes that the name means "Brown's castle.") was a culmination of the conflict between King Æthelstan and the northern kings. After Æthelstan had defeated the Vikings at York in 928, Constantine II, the Scottish King, recognised the threat posed by the House of Wessex to his own position, and began forging alliances with neighbouring kingdoms to attempt a pre-emptive strike against Æthelstan. He married his daughter to Amlaíb mac Gofraid (also called Olaf Guthfrithsson, and Anlaf in the poem), the Norse-Gael King of Dublin. Amlaíb had a claim to the throne of Northumbria, from which Æthelstan expelled his father in 927. Thus, the invading army combined "Vikings, Scots, and Strathclyde Britons." On the English side, Æthelstan was joined by his brother, the later King Edmund. In the ensuing battle, the combined forces of Wessex and Mercia won a decisive victory.

== The poem ==
The poem is preserved in manuscripts A, B, C and D of the Anglo-Saxon Chronicle. In Old English manuscripts verse is set out as a continuous entry, as in prose, but poetry is sometimes marked by pointing, for example at every half-line in ms A. The 73-line long poem is written in "indeterminate Saxon," that is, the regular West-Saxon dialect in which most surviving Old English poetry is copied. It is referred to as a panegyric celebrating the victory of Æthelstan and Edmund I.

The text begins by praising King Æthelstan and his brother Edmund I for their victory. It mentions the fall of "Scots and seafarers" in a battle that lasted an entire day, while "the battlefield flowed / with dark blood." "Norse seafarer[s]" and "weary Scot[s]" were killed by "West Saxons [who] / pursued those hateful people", killing them from behind with their swords; neither did "the Mercians...stint / hard handplay". "Five young kings" are killed in battle along with "seven / of Anlaf's earls". Amlaíb mac Gofraid ("Anlaf") flees by boat, and Constantine flees to: the north, leaving "his son / savaged by weapons on that field of slaughter, / a mere boy in battle." The poem concludes by comparing the battle to those fought in earlier stages of English history:

Never, before this,
were more men in this island slain
by the sword's edge--as books and aged sages
confirm--since Angles and Saxons sailed here
from the east, sought the Britons over the wide seas,
since those warsmiths hammered the Welsh,
and earls, eager for glory, overran the land. (Note: All quotes from Kevin Crossley-Holland's translation.)

== Style and tone ==
The style of the poem has been described as "sagalike in its sparse use of language combined with ample specific detail." According to George Anderson, since the poem comes so late in the Old English period, it gives evidence of the continuing attraction of the "warrior tradition": it is "clear and convincing testimony to the vitality of the Old English battle-epic tradition; the authentic ring sounds out years after the Beowulf Poet, Caedmon, and Cynewulf have been laid to rest." Donald Fry compares passages from Beowulf and Brunanburh (concerning the boarding of ships) and remarks on the "similar diction and imagery". According to Malcolm Godden, the language resembles that of the Old English Genesis A. The poem is not without its detractors: an early critic, Walter J. Sedgefield, in a 1904 study of the poems in the Anglo-Saxon Chronicle, said "even the longest and best written of their number, the Battle of Brunanburh, is but a simulacrum, a ghost of the older epos". That the poem should not be treated as a historical text, and that panegyric was the appropriate genre, was argued by Alistair Campbell: "The poet's subjects are the praise of heroes and the glory of victory. When this is realised, the oft-repeated criticism, that he does not greatly add to our knowledge of the battle, falls to the ground. It was not his object to do so. He was not writing an epic or a 'ballad.' He was writing a panegyric." Townend agrees, and notes that praise-poems on contemporary men are completely missing from the Anglo-Saxon period until a cluster of four panegyrics including Brunanburh in the Anglo-Saxon Chronicle.

Compared to "The Battle of Maldon", an Old English poem that commemorates a battle between English and Vikings half a century later, Brunanburh is notable for its nationalist overtones, whereas Maldon celebrates Christian over non-Christian values. Indeed, the poem is seen as celebrating a logical progression in the development of England as a unified nation ruled by the House of Wessex; the battle reports "the dawning of a sense of nationality, ....a crisis in which a nation is involved". In this respect, Brunanburh is closer to the Anglo-Saxon poem The Taking of the Five Boroughs, also found in the Chronicle under the year 942, celebrating King Edmund's recapture of the Five Boroughs of the Danelaw. But while the poet claims veracity, Michael Swanton notes, "it is ironic in view of his primarily historic concerns that he is in fact more successful than the Maldon-poet in transmitting the traditional poetic style." Peter Clemoes argues in Interactions of Thought and Language in Old English Poetry that Brunanburh, as opposed to Maldon, relies on "uncomplicated patriotic triumphalism". The poem does not treat "personal responsibility" as Maldon does, but leans on an expansive view of history which sees the battle, in line with the Chronicle's view of contemporary history as the "epitome of Anglo-Saxon, especially West Saxon, history with antecedents in the history of Britain", as "straightforwardly traditional". According to Patrick Wormald, the poem builds on the "sense of ideological identity that the English had been given by Bede."

This poet from the 10th century is recalling the Germanic conquest of England which occurred in the 5th century; he connects his memory of this present victory, which must have been very moving for the Saxons — for it was more common for the Norse to defeat them, and rare for them to be the victors — he linked it to the often secular victories enjoyed by the first Germanic peoples who arrived in England.

— Jorge Luis Borges

Accompanying the combatants are the usual "beasts of battle" found in other Old English poems—the wolf, the raven, and the eagle. The Battle of Brunanburh, however, seems to include a fourth animal, the guþhafoc (literally Goshawk), or "war-hawk," in line 64. However, editors and scholars of the poem have suggested that graedigne guþhafoc, "greedy war-hawk", is actually a kenning for the hasu-padan, / earn æftan hwit, the "dusky coated, white-tailed eagle" of lines 62b-63a.

Simon Walker suggests that was written at Worcester, under the influence of its bishop, Koenwald, and that the emphasis on Edmund's contribution suggests that it was written during his reign. Sarah Foot finds the arguments for the first suggestion convincing but not the second.

The poem's structure shows close affinity with Old Norse skaldic conventions, including disciplined use of alliterating head-staves (höfuðstafir) governing semantic meaning across half-lines, consistent with Eddic and skaldic compositional practice rather than standard Old English verse tradition. Technically precise ship terminology — including cnear (the Old Norse knörr, an ocean-going cargo vessel) and stefne (the prow) — combined with an outsider's perspective framing Britain as an island, suggests a Norse-literate composer for whom seafaring was lived experience. There are 8 word that are specific to weaponry terms and 11 word specific to marine terms. The poem's complete absence of Christian theological register, exceptional in a monastic chronicle, is consistent with an original heathen Norse composition later transcribed by a Christian scribe.

Gewitan him þa Norðmen
nægled cnearru,
dreorig daraðalaf,
ondinges mere
ofer deop wæter
Difelin secan,
eft hira land
æwiscmode.

The Parker manuscript scribe correctly and consistently applies the Old English orthographic distinction between thorn (þ) and eth (ð) throughout — þ word-initially, ð medially and finally — a discipline many contemporary scribes did not maintain. This has direct implications for the contested place-name Dinges mere: the scribe writes it with initial D, not þ. Since he reliably distinguishes þ from D and Ð elsewhere, deriving Dingesmere from Old Norse þing (assembly) — as proposed in connection with the Viking assembly site at Thingwall on the Wirral — is difficult to sustain on palaeographical grounds. This is reinforced by the poem's alliterative structure: the governing head-stave of the Dinges mere passage alliterates on D, binding it with "dreorig" and "daraðalaf", and D does not alliterate with þ in either Old English or Old Norse prosodic convention.

== Editions, adaptations, and translations ==
"The Battle of Brunanburh" is edited by Martin Foys and Kyle Smith, with annotations and links to digital images of all five of its manuscript witnesses, with modern translation, in the Old English Poetry in Facsimile Project.

The poem is included in the Anglo-Saxon Poetic Records. (Note: Elliot Van Kirk Dobbie, ed., The Anglo-Saxon Minor Poems. Anglo-Saxon Poetic Records 6. New York: Columbia UP, 1942.) The now-accepted standard edition of the poem is the 1938 edition by Alistair Campbell. (Note: According to Kemp Malone, "This is the most thorough edition of Brunanburh ever published". According to Dorothy Whitelock, "It is a very thorough piece of work and will doubtless become the authoritative edition of the poem.") The Battle of Brunanburh: A Casebook, edited by Michael Livingston, was published by the University of Exeter Press in 2011; it includes two alternative translations of the poem and essays on the battle and the poem.

The twelfth-century Anglo-Norman chronicler Geoffrey Gaimar likely used the account in the Anglo-Saxon Chronicle for his treatment of Æthelstan in his L'Estoire des Engles. English poet Alfred, Lord Tennyson translated (or "modernized") the poem in 1880, publishing it as part of his Ballads and Other Poems (and his son Hallam Tennyson published a prose translation of the poem). In contrast to many other translations of poetry, Tennyson's is still praised as "a faithful, sensitive, even eloquent recreation of its source." The Argentine writer Jorge Luis Borges wrote a short poem, "Brunanburh 937 AD," a translation of which was published in The New Yorker. In a 1968 lecture at Harvard University, Borges praised Tennyson's translation, stating that in some locutions Tennyson sounds "more Saxon than the original." A translation by Burton Raffel is included in Alexandra Hennessey Olsen's anthology Poems and prose from the Old English.

== Bibliography ==
- Anderson, George K. (1966). The Literature of the Anglo-Saxons (Rev. ed.). Princeton UP.
- Ashdown, Margaret (1922). "The Single Combat in Certain Cycles of English and Scandinavian Tradition and Romance". The Modern Language Review. 17 (2): 113–30. doi:10.2307/3714438. JSTOR 3714438.
- Bately, Janet, ed. (1986). The Anglo-Saxon Chronicle, A Collaborative Edition, 3, MS A. Cambridge: D. S. Brewer. ISBN 978-0-85991-103-0.
- Borges, Jorge Luis (18 April 1977). The New Yorker. Alastair Reid (trans.). p. 42.
- Borges, Jorge Luis (2002). "Word-Music and Translation". This Craft in Verse. Harvard UP. pp. 57–78. ISBN 978-0-674-00820-5.
- Carroll, Jayne (2007). "Engla Waldend, Rex Admirabilis: Poetic Representations of King Edgar". Review of English Studies. 58 (234): 113–32. doi:10.1093/res/hgl144.
- Clemoes, Peter (1995). "The Poetry of a Universal Religion: Loyalty as a Responsibility of the Individual". Interactions of Thought and Language in Old English Poetry. Cambridge Studies in Anglo-Saxon England. Vol. 12. Cambridge UP. ISBN 978-0-521-03516-3.
- Crossley-Holland, Kevin (1984). "The Battle of Brunanburh". The Anglo-Saxon World. Oxford UP. pp. 19–21. ISBN 978-0-19-281632-0.
- Fee, Christopher R. (2001). Gods, heroes & kings: the battle for mythic Britain. Oxford UP. ISBN 978-0-19-513479-7.
- Foot, Sarah (2008). "Where English Becomes British: Rethinking Contexts for Brunanburh". In Barrow, Julia; Wareham, Andrew (eds.). Myth, Rulership, Church and Charters. Abingdon, Oxfordshire: Ashgate. pp. 127–144. ISBN 978-0-7546-5120-8.
- Fry, Donald K. (1981). "Launching Ships in Beowulf 210-216 and Brunanburh 32b-36". Modern Philology. 79 (1): 6–66. doi:10.1086/391097. JSTOR 437364. S2CID 161950998.
- Godden, Malcolm (2007). "Biblical literature: the Old Testament". In Malcolm Godden (ed.). The Cambridge Companion to Old English Literature. Michael Lapidge. Cambridge UP. pp. 206–26. ISBN 978-0-521-37794-2.
- Hawthorne, Julian (1906). The masterpieces and the history of literature. New York: Hamilton.
- Herring, Scott (2008). "A Hawk from a Handsaw: A Note on the Beasts of 'The Battle of Brunanburh'". American Notes and Queries. 21 (1): 9–11. doi:10.3200/anqq.21.1.9-11. S2CID 162360209.
- Kuczynski, Michael P. (2007). "Translation and Adaptation in Tennyson's Battle of Brunanburh". Philological Quarterly. 86 (4): 415–31.
- Livingston, Michael, ed. (2011). The Battle of Brunanburh: A Casebook. University of Exeter Press. ISBN 978-0-85989-862-1.
- Malone, Kemp (1927). "A Note on Brunanburh". Modern Language Notes. 42 (4): 238–39. doi:10.2307/2914261. JSTOR 2914261.
- Malone, Kemp (1940). "Rev. of Campbell, Battle of Brunanburh". Modern Language Notes. 55 (1): 74–76. doi:10.2307/2911346. JSTOR 2911346.
- Olsen, Alexandra Hennessey; Raffel, Burton (1998). Poems and prose from the Old English. Yale UP. ISBN 978-0-300-06995-2.
- Opland, Jeff (1993). "Scop and Imbongi IV: Reading Prose Poems". Comparative Literature. 45 (2): 97–120. doi:10.2307/1771433. JSTOR 1771433.
- Stenton, Sir Frank (1971). "The conquest of Scandinavian England". Anglo-Saxon England. The Oxford History of England (3 ed.). Oxford UP.
- Swanton, Michael (1987). English Literature before Chaucer. Longman Literature in English. Longman. ISBN 0-582-49242-4.
- Townend, Matthew (2000). "Pre-Cnut Praise-Poetry in Viking Age England". The Review of English Studies. 51 (new series) (203): 349–70. doi:10.1093/res/51.203.349. JSTOR 519297.
- Treharne, Elaine M. (2004). Old and Middle English c.890-c.1400: an anthology. Wiley-Blackwell. pp. 28–34. ISBN 9781405113137.
- Treharne, Elaine M. (1999). "Romanticizing the Past in the Middle English Athelston". The Review of English Studies. 50 (new series) (197): 1–21. doi:10.1093/res/50.197.1. JSTOR 517756.
- Walker, Simon (1992). "A Context for 'Brunanburh'?". In Reuter, Timothy (ed.). Warriors and Churchmen in the High Middle Ages: Essays Presented to Karl Leyser. London: The Hambledon Press. pp. 21–39. ISBN 978-1-85285-063-0.
- Whitelock, Dorothy (1940). "Rev. of Campbell, Battle of Brunanburh". Modern Language Review. 35 (1): 78–80. doi:10.2307/3717419. JSTOR 3717419.
- Whitelock, Dorothy, ed. (1979). English Historical Documents, Volume 1, c. 500–1042 (2nd ed.). London, UK: Routledge. ISBN 978-0-415-14366-0.
- Woolf, Alex (2007). From Pictland to Alba: 789 - 1070. Edinburgh UP. ISBN 978-0-7486-1234-5.
- Wormald, Patrick (2007). "Anglo-Saxon society and its literature". In Malcolm Godden (ed.). The Cambridge Companion to Old English Literature. Michael Lapidge. Cambridge UP. pp. 1–22. ISBN 978-0-521-37794-2.
- Bjornsson, Stefan; Vernhardsson, Bjorn (2019). Brunanburh: Located Through Egil's Saga. Reykjavik: Hugfari. ISBN 978-9935-9428-0-4.
