= Hector Munro Chadwick =

English philologist (1870–1947)

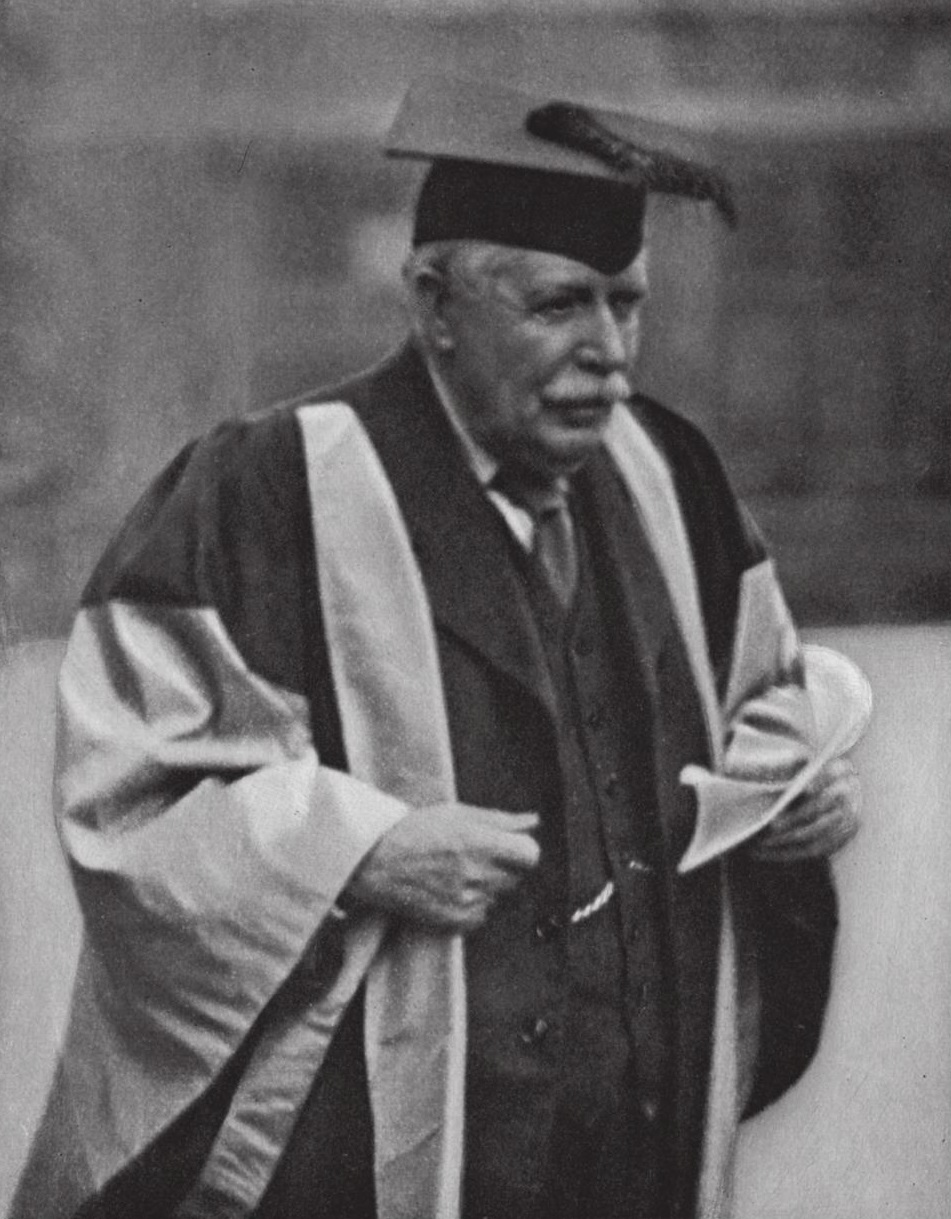
- Born: 22 October 1870; Thornhill Lees, Yorkshire, England
- Died: 2 January 1947 (aged 76); Cambridge, England
- Spouse: Nora Kershaw (after 1922)

Academic background
- Education: Clare College, Cambridge
- Academic advisor: Walter William Skeat
- Influences: Paul Du Chaillu

Academic work
- Discipline: Celtic studies; Germanic studies
- Sub-discipline: Anglo-Saxons; Celts; Epic poetry
- Institutions: University of Cambridge
- Notable works: The Origin of the English Nation (1907); The Heroic Age (1912); (With Nora K. Chadwick) The Growth of Literature (1932–1940)
- Notable ideas: Heroic Age

Hector Munro Chadwick FBA (22 October 1870 – 2 January 1947) was an English philologist. Chadwick was the Elrington and Bosworth Professor of Anglo-Saxon and the founder and head of the Department for Anglo-Saxon and Kindred Studies at the University of Cambridge. Chadwick was well known for his encouragement of interdisciplinary research on Celts and Germanic peoples, and for his theories on the Heroic Age in the history of human societies. Chadwick was a tutor of many notable students and the author of numerous influential works in his fields of study. Much of his research and teaching was conducted in cooperation with his wife, former student and fellow Cambridge scholar Nora Kershaw.

== Family ==
On 22 October 1870, Hector Munro Chadwick was born in Thornhill Lees, Yorkshire, England, the third son of Reverend Edward Chadwick and Sarah Anne Bates.

The Chadwick family traced its descent from John Chadwick of Chadwick Hall, Rochdale, who flourished during the reign of Elizabeth I. Edward was the seventh of the eight sons of James Chadwick, who in turn was a son of yet another John Chadwick. John and his sons were all members of the firm of John Chadwick & Sons, who were flannel manufacturers in Rochdale. The firm had a branch in Edinburgh, and it was there that James married Sarah Murray, daughter of George Murray and Margaret Munro, who was probably a sister of General Hector Munro. Sarah Murray was of Scottish descent.

Edward Chadwick was educated at St John's College, Cambridge, and met Sarah while he was Curate at Church of St George, Chester Road, Hulme. Sarah was the only daughter and one of eight children of an Oldham businessman of considerable prominence. Her grandfather was a member of the same business. Her cousin, Captain Chadwick, had served with distinction in the Crimean War. Sarah's father retired early from business and became a farmer at Old Trafford. Sarah's mother died on the day Sarah was to marry Edward Chadwick, allegedly heartbroken over the prospect of losing contact with her daughter. The marriage was subsequently postponed for a while. After finally marrying, Edward and Sarah spent their early years at Blue Pits, where their eldest son Edward was born. Shortly afterwards, the family moved to Thornhill Lees, Yorkshire, where Edward Chadwick senior became a close friend to a member of the Bibby family, which owned the Bibby Line. The Bibbys built a church for Edward in the suburbs of Thornhill Lees, where he became Vicar. It was during this time that the Chadwicks had their three remaining children, Dora, Murray, and then Hector. Edward ended his career as Rural Dean of Dewsbury, and his two oldest sons also joined the priesthood of the Church of England.

== Early life and education ==
Hector was by far the youngest child of the family, and had a very close relationship with his sister. Dora taught him both letters and Latin, and he later said that she "brought me up". Chadwick's father strongly encouraged his children to study, and used to tell Hector that a bear would come and carry him off if he did not learn his Latin. As a result, one of Chadwick's memories was peering for the bear through a window near the vicarage's front door.

Chadwick attended Bradford Grammar School from 1882 to 1883. At Bradford he showed himself a gifted student, but did not like school life, and often feigned sickness in order to stay home from school. In 1884 he was tutored at home by his sister and the curators. From 1885 to 1889, Chadwick attended Wakefield Grammar School as a day-boy. He commuted 8 miles to Wakefield each day, during which he learned German by himself. At Wakefield, Chadwick was a passionate player of tennis, and served as treasurer of the school cricket club. Contemporary students at Wakefield later described him as a determined but shy boy, who happily helped out his classmates with their Latin. Shyness, intelligence, determination and a strong willingness to help others were personality traits which were to characterize him into adulthood.

Upon leaving Wakefield in 1889, Chadwick obtained a Cave Exhibition at Clare College, Cambridge. That summer, he made a trip to Scotland, Ulster, Wales and the Isle of Man. He subsequently did his Little Go and entered Cambridge. While an undergraduate, Chadwick made memorable visits to Continental Europe with his brother Edward, during which they visited Austria and Italy. In 1890, Chadwick was elected Classical Scholar at Clare. In 1892, Chadwick obtained a First Class, Division 3 of Part I of the Classical Tripos, and gained his B.A. The next year (1893), he obtained a First Class with distinction in Philology in the Classical Tripos. From 1893 to 1899, Chadwick was a Fellow at Clare.

In 1894, his "The Origin of the Latin Perfect Formation in -ui" was published in Adalbert Bezzenberger's Beitrage zur Kunde der indo-germanischen Sprachen. It was during this time, when visiting his brother Murray, that Chadwick came upon Paul Du Chaillu's The Viking Age. Through this book, Chadwick gained a strong interest in the early civilizations of Northern Europe. The book was characterized by an interdisciplinary approach to every aspect of its subject, which was an approach which was also to characterize his future teaching and research. In the summer of 1895, Chadwick attended lectures at the University of Freiburg under Wilhelm Streitberg.

== Career ==
=== Starting out ===
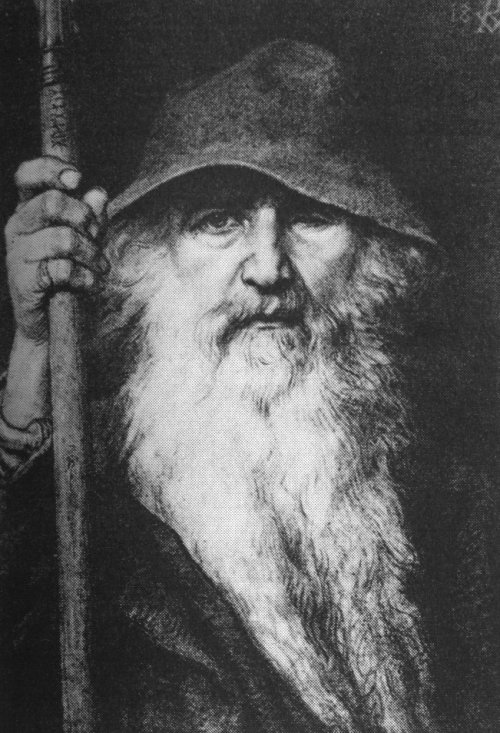
Odin in the guise of a wanderer, by Georg von Rosen (1886). Chadwick's first book, The Cult of Othin, examined worship of Odin among the Germanic peoples.

Returning to Cambridge in 1895, Chadwick taught Old English for Section B of the Medieval and Modern Languages Tripos, while devoting himself to the study of the early North. He gained his M.A. in 1896. Section B had been established in 1894. Its teachers at the time included Israel Gollancz and George Campbell Macaulay. Its Chair was Walter William Skeat, the Elrington and Bosworth Professor of Anglo-Saxon. Skeat was primarily concerned with the study of Middle English. Section B covered Old English, Middle English, Anglo-French, Gothic and Icelandic, and English and Germanic linguistics. It was mostly limited to linguistics, and attracted few students, which however included future distinguished scholars such as Allen Mawer.

Chadwick was quickly recognized as a highly gifted tutor. His lectures were conducted in an informal manner, and he was particularly noted for his supervisions, which he began giving his students individually while they were still undergraduates. Many a student of Chadwick later described these supervisions at his home as formative events in their scholarly careers. Chadwick gained a large and loyal following among his students, who gave him the pet name "Chadders". Many of his students were female, and he insisted that they were to be treated equally with their male peers, which was quite uncommon at English universities at the time. Chadwick treated his students as his intellectual peers, which sometimes resulted in him recommending them subjects which were beyond their capabilities. Around thirty of his students came to hold prominent positions in academia, not to mention the large number of museum officials, librarians and learned individuals of prominence who had studied under him.

From 1899 to 1919, Chadwick became solely responsible for teaching at the Section B of the Medieval and Modern Languages Tripos. In 1899, Chadwick published three works: "Ablaut problems in the Indo-Germanic Verb" in Indogermanische Forschungen, "Studies in Old English" in Transactions of the Cambridge Philological Society, and his first book, The Cult of Othin, which was published by Cambridge University Press. His "Studies in Old English" was a pioneering monograph on dialects and sound changes in Old English. In The Cult of Othin, he examined worship of Odin among the Germanic peoples. The book took all relevant evidence into consideration, including linguistic, literary, and archaeological evidence, which was to become a typical feature of his scholarly approach. In conclusion, Chadwick argued that worship of Odin was in all essential features the same among all the Germanic peoples, including Anglo-Saxons and Norse peoples. In 1899, his Fellowship at Clare was renewed.

In 1900, two important papers by Chadwick, "The Oak and the Thunder-God" and "The Ancient Teutonic Priesthood", appeared in the Journal of the Anthropological Institute and in Folk-Lore. From 1903 to 1911, he was Librarian at the college.

In 1905, Chadwick published Studies in Anglo-Saxon Institutions. It was at the time considered the best work ever published on Anglo-Saxon society, and was highly influential. In 1907, he contributed chapter III on "Early National Poetry" to the first volume of the Cambridge History of English Literature. The same year saw the publishing of his monumental The Origins of the English Nation (1907). Investigating the origins of the Anglo-Saxons and the English people, this work has been highly praised for its interdisciplinary combination of archaeological, historical and philological evidence from both England and Northern Europe. In 1907, the scope of Section B at the Medieval and Modern Languages Tripos was broadened to cover Anglo-Saxon, Germanic and Viking Age history, culture and religion.

Upon a 1909 recommendation of the board of medieval and modern languages at Cambridge, Chadwick was in 1910 appointed Lecturer in Scandinavian at Cambridge, holding this position for two years.

=== The Heroic Age ===
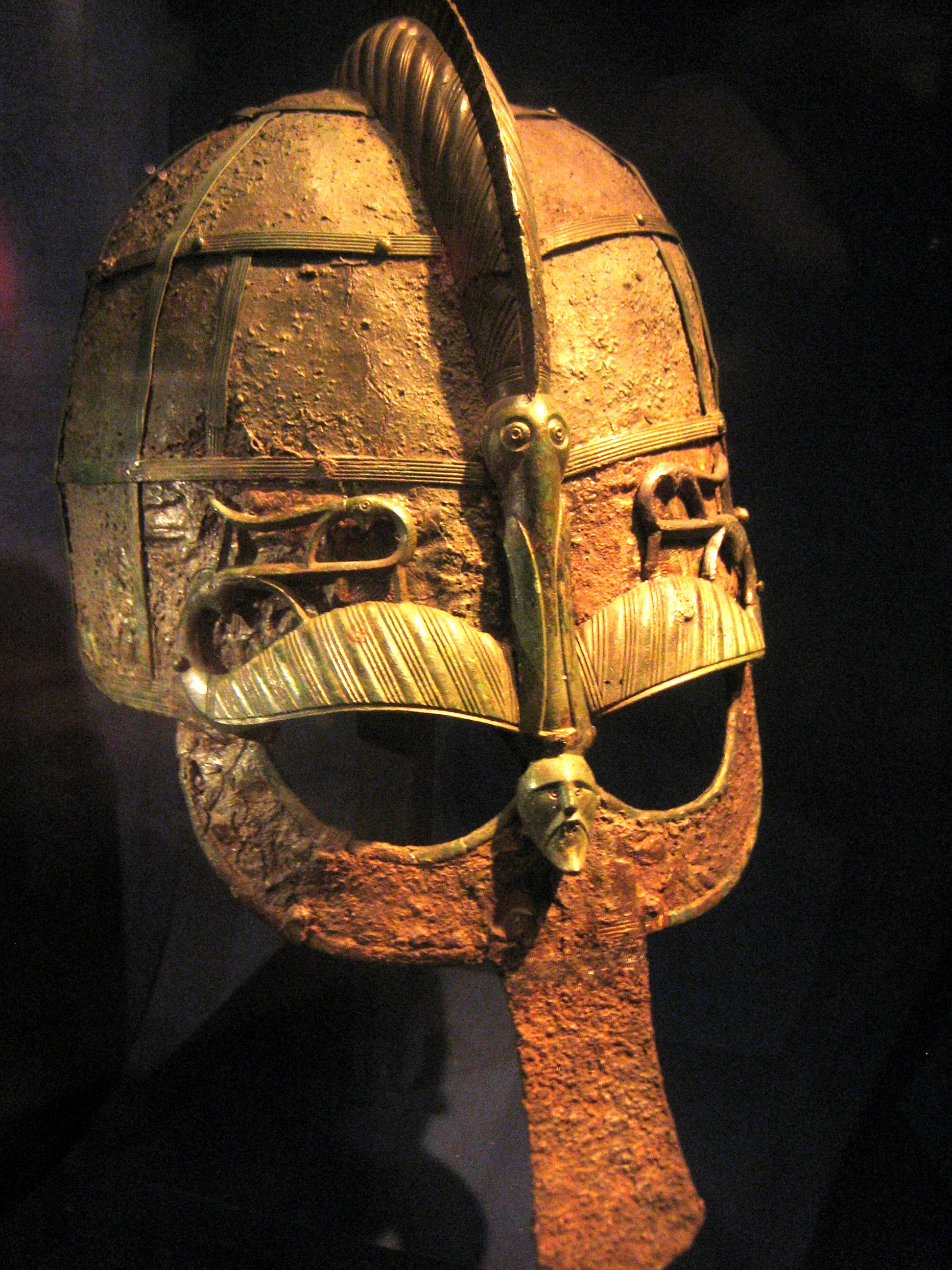
In The Heroic Age (1912), Chadwick postulated the existence of a Germanic Heroic Age in the Vendel Period (Vendel helmet shown), analogous to the Greek Heroic Age.

In 1912, he published The Heroic Age, which is considered one of his most important works. In this work Chadwick conducted a pioneering examination of parallels between the epic poetry of the Greek Heroic Age and the Germanic Heroic Age. Celtic, Roman and Slavic epic poetry was also considered, which testifies to the wide and diverse knowledge possessed by Chadwick at this time.

Chadwick postulated the Heroic Age as a distinct period in the history of numerous human societies. During such Heroic Ages, warrior aristocrats figure prominently, and courage and martial prowess is valued above all else. For Chadwick, such an Heroic Age was not one of primitiveness, but rather one of youthfulness, vigour and rebellion. According to him, Heroic Ages typically emerged when tribal societies came into close contact with more advanced civilizations, such as when the Germanic peoples encountered ancient Rome. Notably, Chadwick postulated the existence of Heroic Ages also among Celts and Slavs. The Heroic Age attracted strong interests from both Classicists and Germanicists. It remains a pioneering work of comparative literature.

=== Leadership and reform at Cambridge ===
Upon the death of Skeat in 1912, Chadwick was recognized as the obvious successor, and was subsequently elected Elrington and Bosworth Professor of Anglo-Saxon at Cambridge. He held this position until reaching the age limit in 1941. Chadwick's election to this professorship marks a new phase in his career, during which his time was mostly dedicated to teaching and administrative work.

In agreement with previous wishes expressed by Skeat, Chadwick sought to broaden the scope of the Section beyond the field of philology, and make it concerned not only with the study of Anglo-Saxons, but also with Germanic studies and Celtic studies. By this time, he had come to see philology not as an object in itself, but rather as a key to the early history of the Germanic peoples, and the English people in particular. He insisted that scholarship should be informed through direct engagement with primary sources in their original languages and contexts. Although encountering significant opposition, Chadwick's efforts at reform were successful through a 1917 changing of regulations, which he drew up by himself. The scope of the department subsequently extended well beyond language and literature, to include history, archaeology and the study of culture, including religion and social institutions.

Chadwick's reforms at Cambridge were not limited to Section B. With his friends Professor Arthur Quiller-Couch and Dr. Hugh Fraser Stewart, he remodelled Section A (English studies) and transformed the Medieval and Modern Language Tripos in the Modern and Medieval Languages Tripos, in which English became a more or less independent course covered in sections A and B. The reforms encountered significant opposition, most notably by certain members of the English Association, but through his tenacity, persuasiveness and strategic skills, Chadwick was able to outmanoeuvre his conservative critics, and his reforms were subsequently successfully implemented.

Among Chadwick's few publications during his early years as a university administrator was his "Some German River-names", a philological study examining the origins of the Celts, which was published in Essays and Studies presented to William Ridgeway (1913). He accepted the reduction in his literary output without regret, because he considered teaching and directing his students to be a task of even greater importance than his written work.

=== World War I and continued reform ===
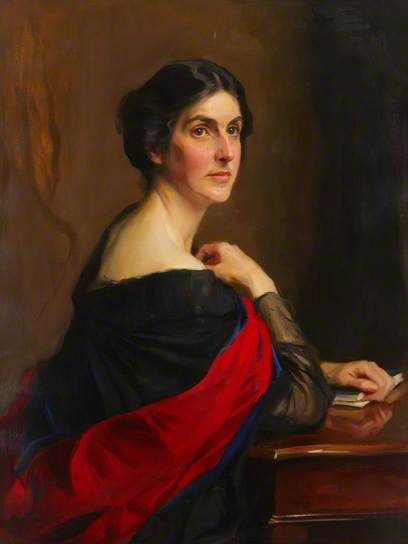
Bertha Phillpotts was one of the many students of Chadwick who became prominent scholars.

In the years of World War I, there was general understanding that British scholarship had devoted too much effort on the study of languages as compared to the people who spoke them. As a result, the importance of philology for the study of history and culture, particularly in the field of English studies, was increasingly emphasized. Chadwick was the dominant figure in this effort. He received an honorary D.Litt from Durham University in 1914, and an honorary LL.D from the University of St Andrews in 1919.

On 4 May 1922, Chadwick married Nora Kershaw, a former student of his. Nora eventually became a Fellow at Newnham College, Cambridge, and an intimate scholarly companion of Chadwick. They published several influential works together. Nora was an accomplished philologist, in fact so much so that a reviewer of one of her works on Old English and Old Norse poetry wrongly mistook the work as Hector's. The Chadwicks settled into an old paper-mill outside Cambridge, close to the Norman Leper Chapel, which came under their care. They were animal lovers, and kept a large number of cats and dogs which they named after personages in Beowulf and Norse mythology. Their home became a salon for enthusiasts of early Germanic and Celtic literature. With Nora as the driver, the Chadwicks took students by car to see archaeological sites near Cambridge, and made long trips together to Wales, Scotland and Ireland. They bought a house at Vowchurch in the Golden Valley near Wales, where they spent much time. Chadwick was proud of his Scottish ancestry, and had a passionate interest in all things Celtic.

During the first years of its existence, Chadwick was almost entirely responsible for teaching at his rapidly growing Section B, but was admirably assisted by his wife. Former students of his who lectured at his section included Cyril Fox and Frederick Attenborough.

In 1920, Chadwick and his Section B had lost its eminent Celticist Edmund Crosby Quiggin, and Nora stepped in for the deceased as a teacher of Irish, while Hector taught Welsh. In 1925, among their notable students were Kenneth H. Jackson, who became an eminent Celticist in Chadwick's department. Chadwick was elected a Fellow of the British Academy. Following the Royal Commission on the Universities and the introduction of the Faculty system, Chadwick and his Section B acquired a permanent staff. Two lecturers were appointed in 1926, including his friend and former student Bertha Phillpotts, widely recognized as one of England's foremost authorities in Old Norse studies. Her premature death in 1932 was keenly felt by Chadwick and his colleagues.

In the late 1920s, Chadwick became increasingly interested in the fields of archaeology and anthropology. In 1927, he transferred his Section B to the new Faculty of Archaeology and Anthropology, where it become known as the Department for Anglo-Saxon and Kindred Studies. Chadwick sought to make its courses into a broad independent discipline akin to the Classics. In 1928, he was elected an Honorary Member of the Royal Society of the Humanities at Lund.

=== The Growth of Literature ===
The Growth of Literature... has clarified the subject of the beginnings of literature for all time.

— The Times

Although Chadwick had heavily concentrated on his university duties rather than his own writing after becoming Professor, Nora insisted that he begin writing again. He argued that his university work was more important, but Nora persisted, and eventually persuaded him into resuming writing after suggesting to him that they write a work together. This ushered in what Chadwick's student, friend and colleague Jose Maria de Navarro considers the final stage of Chadwick's career. The Chadwicks continued the line of research pursued by Chadwick in his The Heroic Age (1912). Their original intention was to conduct a comparative study of the literature, archaeology and general civilization of the Viking Age and Ancient Greece, to which they began collecting material in 1919. About this time however, Chadwick came upon Early Adventures in Persia, Susiana and Babylonia by Austen Henry Layard, in which the effect of the recital of the Shahnameh on the followers of Mehemet Taki Khan is described.

Impressed by the parallels of the Shahnameh with Greek epic poetry, the Chadwicks decided to broaden the scope of their project, which eventually came to encompass the oral literature of a large number of peoples. The resulting work, The Growth of Literature (1932–1940), was published in three volumes. The first volume was mostly written by Hector, and was concerned with the ancient oral literature of Europe, although Nora collected the material on Irish literature. The second volume was mostly written by Nora, although Chadwick wrote its sections of Slavic, Hebrew and Indian literature. The third volume was mostly written by Nora, and included sections on Tatar, Polynesian and African literature, while the concluding section, summarizing all the material of the three volumes, was written by Hector. The Chadwicks were proficient in nearly all of the languages of the literature covered in the book, and it took literary, historical, philological, anthropological and archaeological evidence into account. It has been described as a pioneering and masterful study, and the finest work of Chadwick's career.

=== Last years at Cambridge ===
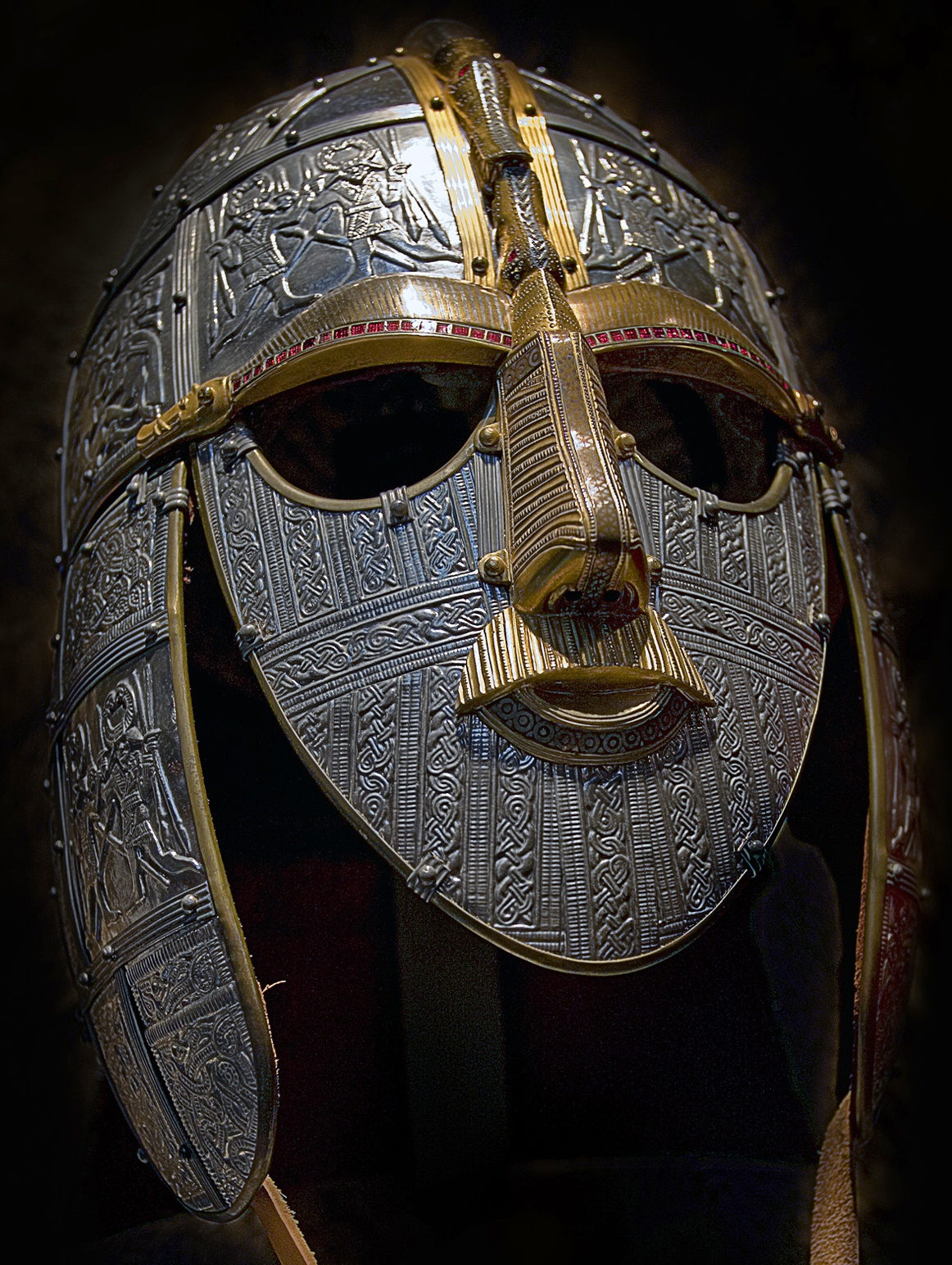
Chadwick argued that the Sutton Hoo burial (replica of Sutton Hoo helmet shown) was of Rædwald of East Anglia.

It was at his country home in Vowchurch that Chadwick began writing his Early Wales and the Saxon Penetration of the West, but the threat of an invasion of England eventually convinced him to abandon the project in 1940, as he felt the looming prospect of a German invasion had too many parallels with the Anglo-Saxon settlement of Britain. When World War II began in 1939, the Chadwicks moved to a new home at Adams Road. During the war, many younger members of the staff left University, and Chadwick once more conducted most of the teaching at his Department for Anglo-Saxon and Kindred Studies. In his notable "Who was he?", published in Antiquity in 1940, he examined the site of Sutton Hoo, and suggested that its magnificent burial was of Rædwald of East Anglia.

Upon attaining the age limit in 1941, Chadwick retired as Elrington and Bosworth Professor of Anglo-Saxon and became an Honorary Fellow at Clare College, but at the request of the university, he continued teaching as head of his department. Chadwick was able to combine his leadership of the department with writing and research. In his The Study of Anglo-Saxon (1941), Chadwick surveyed the history and contemporary state of Anglo-Saxon studies. In this work, he argued in favour of an interdisciplinary method for the study of the Anglo-Saxons, and suggested that Anglo-Saxon studies should be split from the field of English studies and made into a distinct and broad discipline akin to the Classics. Both in his The Study of Anglo-Saxon, and his later "Why compulsory philology", which appeared in The Universities Quarterly for 1946 and was written at the request of the National Union of Students, Chadwick argued against the teaching of philology as a compulsory subject, and instead considered it best suited for post-graduate work. In view of this, some have suggested that he had grown to dislike philology, but Chadwick's ample use of philology in all of his later works suggests that he indeed still appreciated it. Chadwick received an honorary D.Litt. from the University of Oxford in 1943. Upon the election of his friend and former pupil Bruce Dickins as Elrington and Bosworth Professor of Anglo-Saxon, he retired from teaching, satisfied that his department was now safely in good hands.

Chadwick thought that the broad approach he advocated for Anglo-Saxon studies should also be applied to the study of foreign peoples. This idea was further elaborated by him in his The Nationalities of Europe and the Growth of National Ideologies (1945). The writing of this work was strongly connected to the ongoing world war. He argued that the British Empire had not dedicated enough resources to the study of nationalities and their importance. Chadwick suggested the establishment of a government-sponsored Institute of Imperial and Foreign Studies to provide courses on the history, languages and literature of various countries. He believed such knowledge was indispensable for understanding the culture of any country. Chadwick's book presents a general survey of the various nationalities in Europe from an archaeological, historical and philological perspective. He notably located the Celtic homeland somewhere in the Netherlands and northwest Germany. Much of the work is dedicated to the study of the origins and nature of German imperialism. In subsequent years, The Nationalities of Europe and the Growth of National Ideologies became an indispensable work for aspiring members of the Foreign Office.

== Death and legacy ==
Through the immense range of his scholarly publications, and through the vigorous enthusiasm which he brought to all aspects of Anglo-Saxon studies – philological and literary, historical and archaeological – he helped to define the field and give it the interdisciplinary orientation which characterizes it still. The Department... owes its existence and its own interdisciplinary outlook to H.M. Chadwick...

— Department of Anglo-Saxon, Norse and Celtic, University of Cambridge

In his final literary project, Chadwick sought through a combination of archaeological, historical and philological evidence to examine the early history of Scotland. He argued that the Pictish Chronicle and the Chronicle of the Kings of Alba were derived from two distinct oral traditions of the Gaels and Picts respectively. Chadwick suggested that the Pictish language was akin to Welsh, but that nevertheless there had been an early and significant Gaelic presence in early Scotland. Chadwick became gravely ill in February 1946, but recovered and resumed writing on his final work. Within months however, his illness reappeared. He died in his sleep at Evelyn Nursing Home, Trumpington Road, Cambridge, on 2 January 1947. His final work was completed by Nora, and published by Cambridge University Press under the title Early Scotland: The Picts, the Scots and the Welsh of Southern Scotland (1947).

In 1950, The Early Cultures of North-West Europe, a festschrift in Chadwick's honour edited by Cyril Fox and Bruce Dickins, his former students, was published. Under the leadership of his former pupil Dorothy Whitelock, Chadwick's Department for Anglo-Saxon and Kindred Studies was in 1967 merged back into the Faculty of English, eventually becoming known as the Department of Anglo-Saxon, Norse and Celtic. Chadwick is today considered the founder of this department. The H.M. Chadwick Lecture was established in 1990, and is given annually by a scholar who is invited to Cambridge for the occasion.

Chadwick left a long-lasting impact on subsequent scholarship. Christopher N. L. Brooke heralds him as one of the most notable polymaths in the history of Cambridge. As a researcher and writer, Chadwick pioneered interdisciplinary research for the study of the cultures of early Northern Europe and beyond. The interdisciplinary approach of the Chadwicks has strongly influenced Celtic studies up to the present day. At Cambridge, Chadwick is notable for having developed the Department of Anglo-Saxon, Norse and Celtic, and supervised the education of generations of scholars, a large number of whom made major contributions to scholarship.

== Selected works ==
=== Books ===
- The Cult of Othin, 1899
- Studies in Old English, 1899
- Studies on Anglo-Saxon Institutions, 1905
- The Origin of the English Nation, 1907
- The Heroic Age, 1912
- (With Nora K. Chadwick) The Growth of Literature, 1932–1940
- The Study of Anglo-Saxon, 1941
- The Nationalities of Europe, 1945
- (Edited by Nora K. Chadwick) Early Scotland, 1949

=== Articles ===
- "The Origin of the Latin Perfect in -ui", 1894
- "Ablaut Problems in the idg. Verb", 1899
- "The Oak and the Thunder God", 1900
- "The Ancient Teutonic Priesthood", 1900
- "Early Inscriptions in the North of England", 1901
- "Early National Poetry", 1907
- "Ancestor Worship and the Cult of the Dead: Teutonic", 1908
- "Calendar: Teutonic", 1910
- "Some German River Names", 1913
- "The Sutton Hoo Ship Burial VII: Who was he?", 1940
- "Why Compulsory Philology? II", 1946

== Sources ==
- Brooke, Christopher N. L. (1993). A History of the University of Cambridge: 1870–1990. Vol. 4. Cambridge University Press. ISBN 978-0-521-34350-3.
- Dickins, Bruce; Fox, Cyril, eds. (1950). The Early Cultures of North-West Europe. Cambridge University Press. ISBN 978-1107686557.
- de Navarro, Jose Maria (2002) [1947]. "Hector Munro Chadwick". In Lapidge, Michael (ed.). Interpreters of Early Medieval Britain. British Academy. pp. 194–218. ISBN 978-1107686557.
- Löffler, Marion (2006). "Chadwick, H. M. and Nora K.". In Koch, John T. (ed.). Celtic Culture: A Historical Encyclopedia. ABC-CLIO. pp. 397–398. ISBN 978-1-85109-440-0.
- Telfer, W.; Hiagh, John D. (23 September 2004). "Chadwick, Hector Munro". Oxford Dictionary of National Biography (online ed.). Oxford University Press. doi:10.1093/ref:odnb/32342. (Subscription, Wikipedia Library access or UK public library membership required.)
- Zwikstra, Corey J. (2018). "Michael Lapidge (ed), H. M. Chadwick and the study of Anglo-Saxon, Norse and Celtic in Cambridge". Peritia. 29 (29). Medieval Academy of Ireland: 271–274. doi:10.1484/J.PERIT.5.118502. ISSN 2034-6506.
- "Prof. H. M. Chadwick". The Guardian. 3 January 1947. p. 3 – via Newspapers.com.
- "Dr. H. M. Chadwick". The Times. 3 January 1947. p. 7 – via Gale.
