= Anglo-Saxon England (journal) =

- Discipline: English history
- Language: English
- Edited by: Peter Clemoes, Michael Lapidge, Malcolm Godden, Simon Keynes, Rosalind Love, Rory Naismith

Publication details
- History: 1972–2024
- Publisher: Cambridge University Press (England)
- Frequency: Annual
- Open access: Some articles

Standard abbreviations
- ISO 4: Anglo-Sax. Engl.

Indexing
- ISSN: 0263-6751 (print); 1474-0532 (web)
- LCCN: 78190423
- OCLC no.: 1716466

Links
- Journal homepage; Online access; Online archive

Anglo-Saxon England was an annual peer-reviewed interdisciplinary academic journal covering the study of various aspects of history, language, and culture in Anglo-Saxon England, published by Cambridge University Press. It was published from 1972 to 2024, latterly in both print and digital form. In 2024 the journal was relaunched as Early Medieval England and its Neighbours "with a refreshed and expanded scope, an enlarged international editorial team, a format that allows for more frequent and timely publication, with all research fully open to the public instead of behind a subscription paywall, and a more transparent editorial process for authors".

The first forty volumes of the journal included a bibliography providing an overview of the past year's work in Anglo-Saxon studies; a cumulative bibliography is now available online, published by Cambridge University Press.

The journal's motto, 'here one can still see their track', is drawn from King Alfred's Old English translation of Cura pastoralis. The front cover of every issue of the journal features a picture of the reverse of Alfred's "London Monogram" penny.

Editors during the journal's history included Simon Keynes, Rosalind Love, Rory Naismith, Malcolm Godden, Peter A. Clemoes and Michael Lapidge, most of them based at the University of Cambridge.

== See also ==
- Old English Newsletter
