= Heroic Age (literary theory) =

Some 20th-century studies of oral poetry and traditional literature postulate Heroic Ages as stages in the development of human societies likely to give rise to legends about heroic deeds. According to some theorists, oral epic poetry would originate during an Heroic Age, and would be transmitted, by singers who displayed less creativity, through later periods. Scholars who adopted Heroic Age theories include:

- Maurice Bowra (1898–1971)
- Hector Munro Chadwick (1870–1947) and Nora Kershaw Chadwick (1891–1972)

A widely-shared view was that each society would pass through a Heroic Age only once. This apparently explains why, in the Chadwicks' survey of world-wide oral and traditional poetry, The Growth of Literature (published 1932–1940), medieval European epics such as the French Chansons de geste and the Spanish Cantar de Mio Cid are omitted: those societies are taken to have passed through a Heroic Age earlier.

Bryan Hainsworth has suggested that in the various so-called Heroic Ages named by modern scholars "what is described is a by-product ... of the tendency of heroic poetry to congeal into cycles, often ... around a signal event".

Conventionally, Heroic Ages may feature martial aristocratic and monarchical societies, with values focused on honor, reputation, bravery, generosity and friendship.

== Historicity of the Ages ==
Oral tales have been formed into classic literature centuries later, so that the historicity of the events is left to uncertainty. The Greek Heroic Age as described in the Iliad is dated to historic events in 1460 to 1103 BC according to the chronology of Saint Jerome.

The Germanic Heroic Age as reflected in the Nibelungen can be dated to the 5th century picking up scenes from the foundation of Germanic kingdoms in Western Europe near the end of the first phase of the Völkerwanderung. The literature characters may refer to the historic Brunhilda (543–613) and Gundobad (480–516).

The Tamils of South India have an extensive literature describing their Heroic Age (the Sangam period). The Sangam poems share common themes with their Greek and German counterparts, such as glory, victory, fate and honour. The Sangam age is dated to between the 3rd century B.C.E and 2nd century C.E. However, the events described have been transmitted orally from an earlier period. This is evidenced by the oral nature of the poems which (like the Iliad and Odyssey) use epithets and other metrical devices common in oral poetry.

== Bibliography ==
- C. M. Bowra, Heroic poetry. London: Macmillan, 1952.
- H. M. Chadwick, The Heroic Age. London, 1912.
- H. Munro Chadwick, N. Kershaw Chadwick, The growth of literature. Cambridge: Cambridge University Press, 1932-40.
- J. B. Hainsworth, The Iliad: a commentary. Vol. 3: books 9-12. Cambridge: Cambridge University Press, 1993.
