= Elrington and Bosworth Professor of Anglo-Saxon =

The Elrington and Bosworth Professorship of Anglo-Saxon is the senior professorship in Anglo-Saxon at the University of Cambridge.

The first chair was elected in 1878, when a gift endowed in 1867 by Joseph Bosworth, Rawlinsonian Professor of Anglo-Saxon at Oxford, had increased in value sufficiently to support a stipend of £500 a year. It was named after its creator and his wife, Anne Elliot, ex-wife of Colonel Hamilton Elrington. The professor holding this chair is traditionally the head of the Department of Anglo-Saxon, Norse and Celtic, University of Cambridge.

== Elrington and Bosworth Professors ==
- Walter William Skeat (1878–1912)
- Hector Munro Chadwick (1912–1941)
- Bruce Dickins (1946–1957)
- Dorothy Whitelock (1957–1969)
- Peter Alan Martin Clemoes (1969–1982)
- Raymond Ian Page (1984–1991)
- Michael Lapidge (1991–1999)
- Simon Douglas Keynes (1999–2019)
- Rosalind Love (2019–present)
