= Malcolm Godden =

Academic and Old English philologist

Malcolm Reginald Godden (born 9 October 1945) is a British academic who held the chair of the Rawlinson and Bosworth Professor of Anglo-Saxon at the University of Oxford from 1991 until 2013.

== Biography ==
From 1963 to 1966 Godden studied for a B.A. in English at Pembroke College, Cambridge; he then continued with several postgraduate studies until 1969. In 1970 he obtained a PhD from Cambridge University for a dissertation which was an edition of Ælfric's Second Series of Catholic Homilies under the supervision of Professor P. A. M. Clemoes.

Godden's academic appointments include:

- 1969–1972: Junior Research Fellow, Pembroke College, Cambridge
- 1970–1971: Visiting Assistant Professor, Department of English, Cornell University
- 1972–1975: University Lecturer, Department of English Language, Liverpool University
- 1976–1991: Fellow and lecturer in English, Exeter College, Oxford, and CUF Lecturer in the Faculty of English, Oxford University
- 1991–2013: Rawlinson and Bosworth Professor of Anglo-Saxon in the University of Oxford and professorial fellow of Pembroke College, Oxford.

Godden's interests include: Alfredian prose, Wulfstan of York, Ælfric of Eynsham, and medieval theatre. He is an editor of the academic journal Anglo-Saxon England.

== Honours ==
Godden was elected Fellow of the British Academy (FBA) in 2009.

Godden delivered the 2009 Sir Israel Gollancz Memorial Lecture.

== Bibliography ==
- Ælfric's Catholic Homilies: the Second Series, Text (Early English Text Society, Supplementary Series; 5.) Oxford: University Press, 1979
- The Making of Piers Plowman. London, 1990
- The Cambridge Companion to Old English Literature; edited with M. Lapidge. Cambridge: University Press, 1991
- From Anglo-Saxon to Early Middle English: studies presented to E. G. Stanley; edited with D. Gray and T. Hoad. Oxford, 1994
- Ælfric's Catholic Homilies: the First Series, Text; ed. P. Clemoes. (Early English Text Society, Supplementary Series; 17.) Oxford: University Press, 1997
- Ælfric's Catholic Homilies: Introduction, Commentary and Glossary. (Early English Text Society, Supplementary Series; 18.) Oxford: University Press, 2000
- The Old English Boethius: an edition of the Old English versions of Boethius’s "De Consolatione Philosophiae"; edited with S. Irvine. 2 vols. Oxford: University Press, 2009
