= Thornhill Lees =

Coordinates: 53°40′22″N 1°38′04″W

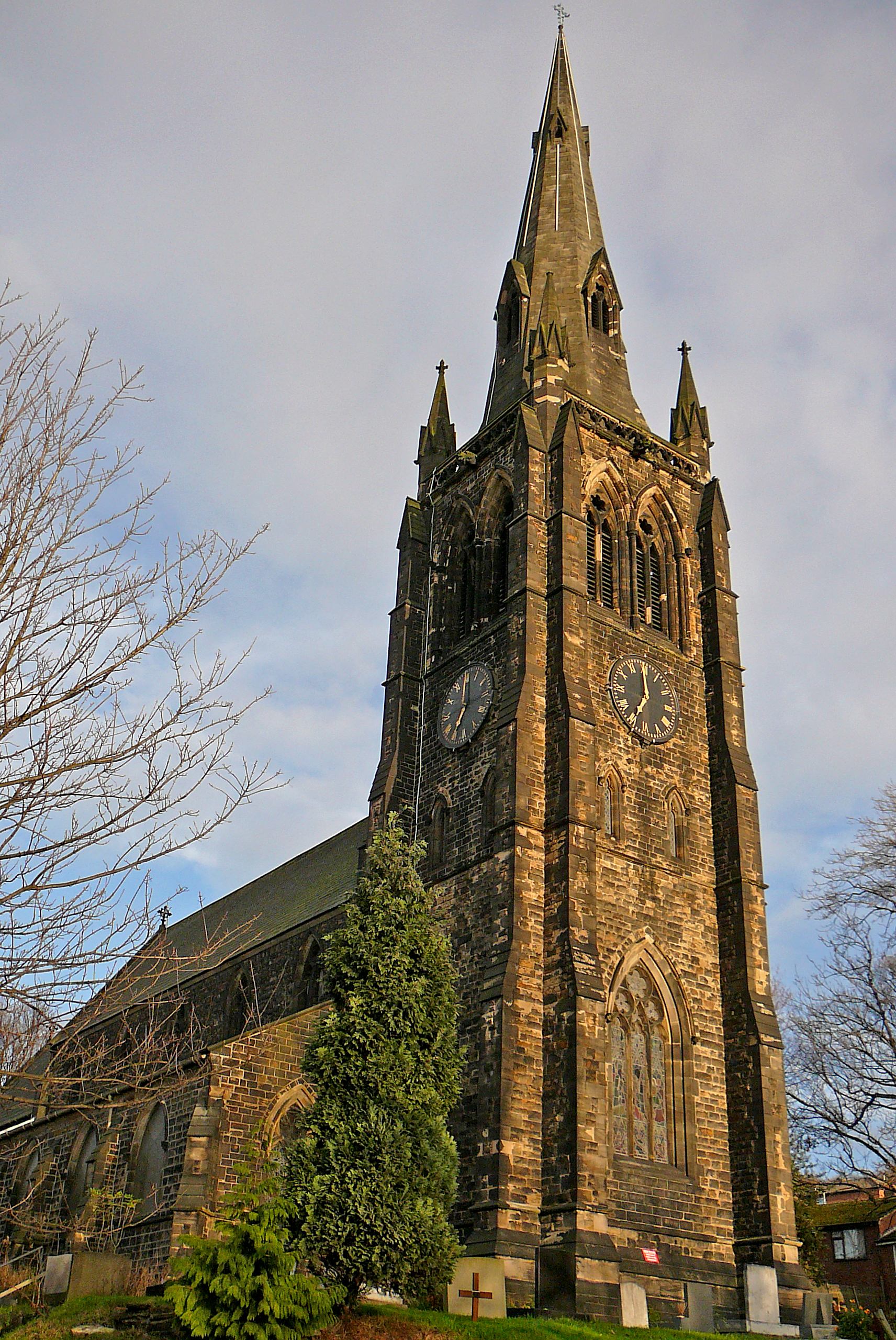

- Location within West Yorkshire
- Metropolitan borough: Kirklees
- Metropolitan county: West Yorkshire
- Region: Yorkshire and the Humber
- Country: England
- Sovereign state: United Kingdom

Thornhill Lees is a district of Thornhill near Dewsbury, in the borough of Kirklees, West Yorkshire, England. Thornhill Lees is between Thornhill and Dewsbury town centre, in the area between the River Calder and the Calder and Hebble Navigation.

Thornhill Lees is served by two schools: Thornhill Lees Infant & Nursery School and Headfield Junior School.

Hector Munro Chadwick, a philologist, was born in Thornhill Lees.
