= Beasts of battle =

Poetic trope in Old English and Old Norse literature

The beasts of battle is a poetic trope in Old English and Old Norse literature. The trope has the wolf, the raven, and the eagle follow warriors into battle to feast on the bodies of the slain. It occurs in eight Old English poems and in the Old Norse Poetic Edda.

== History of the term ==
The term originates with Francis Peabody Magoun, who first used it in 1955, although the combination of the three animals was first considered a theme by Maurice Bowra in 1952.

== History, content ==
The beasts of battle presumably date from an earlier, Germanic tradition; the animals are well known for eating carrion. A mythological connection may be presumed as well, though it is clear that at the time that the Old English manuscripts were produced, in a Christianized England, there was no connection between for instance the raven and Huginn and Muninn or the wolf and Geri and Freki. This mythological and/or religious connection survived for much longer in Scandinavia. Their literary pedigree is unknown. John D. Niles points out that they possibly originate in the wolf and the raven as animals sacred to Wōden; their role as eaters of the fallen victims certainly, he says, accords with the fondness of Old English poets for litotes, or deliberate understatement, giving "ironic expression to the horror of warfare as seen from the side of the losers."

While the beasts have no connection to pagan mythology and theology in the Old English poems they inhabit, such a connection returns, oddly enough, in Christian hagiography: in Ælfric of Eynsham's Passio Sancti Edmundi Regis (11th century) a wolf guards the head of Saint Edmund the Martyr, and in John Lydgate's The Life of Saint Alban and Saint Amphibal (15th century), "the wolf and also the eagle, upon the explicit command of Christ, protect the bodies of the martyrs from all the other carrion beasts."

The Beasts of Battle were also represented in Old English Literature as the harbingers of destruction and death, being present on a field of battle just before the battle ensued, fleeing with distress just before the battle took place. The evacuation of life prior to the battle signified the death and suffering that was soon to come.

== Occurrences in Old English poetry ==
- Battle of Brunanburh (61-65)
- The Battle of Maldon (106-107)
- Beowulf (3024-27)
- Elene (52-53; 110-113)
- Exodus (162-167)
- The Fight at Finnsburgh (5-7)
- Genesis A (1983–1985)
- Judith (204-212; 292-296)
- The Wanderer (80-83)
