= Bruce Dickins =

Bruce Dickins, FBA (26 October 1889 – 4 January 1978), a graduate of Magdalene College, Cambridge, was Professor of English Language at the University of Leeds from 1931 to 1946 (where he succeeded E. V. Gordon), teaching medieval English and Old Norse. He sat on the executive committee of the Yorkshire Society for Celtic Studies from 1931 to at least 1943, serving as president in 1936-37, and editing several numbers of its journal, Yorkshire Celtic Studies.

Dickins became Elrington and Bosworth Professor of Anglo-Saxon, University of Cambridge, from January 1946 until September 1957 (when he was succeeded by Dorothy Whitelock) afterwards Emeritus Professor; and Fellow of Corpus Christi College, Cambridge from 1946. At Cambridge, Dickins continued to support Celtic Studies, creating a University Lectureship for Nora Chadwick in 1950 and in 1955 making "an eloquent case to the General Board for the establishment of a Professorship of Celtic in his Department, so as to put Cambridge on an equal footing with Oxford in this respect" (though the latter proposal was scotched in the face of "aggressive opposition" from Whitelock).

In November 1947, when the issue of full membership of Cambridge University for women was being debated for the fourth time, and a proposal to grant full equality was proposed by a Syndicate appointed to report on the issue, there was only one speaker at the ensuing debate who opposed the proposal and that was Bruce Dickins. He

came forward to oppose the motion. He seemed to think he would be one of a long line of disputants, but he had the floor to himself and no one bothered to counter his plea against the proposed new status for women. In his view, the women did not have any grievances which needed righting, they would gain nothing by membership of the University and, if Oxford was any example, nor would the University. Cambridge would do better to stand firm with Harvard and Yale as all-male institutions. The dim echoes of what had once been a white-hot argument found no support, and the discussion was closed.

In 1968 he held the Sandars Readership in Bibliography at Cambridge University speaking on "The Making of the Parker Library."

Dickins's seventieth birthday was marked by the publication of a Festschrift.

== Archives ==
- Northern Illinois University - Founders Memorial Library, Special Collections Non-Circulating PR1120 .D49 1915a
