= William Chester Jordan =

American medievalist, in which field (born 1948)

- Born: April 7, 1948 (age 78); Chicago, Illinois, U.S.
- Education: Ripon College (BA); Princeton University (PhD)
- Occupations: Medievalist; professor
- Notable work: Europe in the High Middle Ages (2004)
- Title: Dayton-Stockton Professor of History
- Awards: Haskins Medal (1996); American Philosophical; Society (2000); American Academy of Arts and Sciences (2009)

William Chester Jordan (born April 7, 1948) is an American medievalist who serves as the Dayton-Stockton Professor of History at Princeton University; he is a recipient of the Haskins Medal for his work concerning the Great Famine of 1315–1317. He is also a former director of the Program in Medieval Studies at Princeton. Jordan has studied and published on the Crusades, English constitutional history, gender, economics, Judaism, and, most recently, church-state relations in the thirteenth and fourteenth centuries.

== Biography ==
Jordan received an undergraduate education at Ripon College, earning a bachelor's degree in history, mathematics, and Russian studies. In 1973, he earned his Doctor of Philosophy from Princeton University, where he was a student of Joseph R. Strayer. He was the director of the university's Shelby Cullom Davis Center for Historical Studies from 1994 to 1999. In 1996, he won the annual Haskins Medal from the Medieval Academy of America for his work on the Great Famine, published in The Great Famine: Northern Europe in the Early Fourteenth Century. He was elected the second vice-president of the Medieval Academy of America in 2012. Since 2003, Jordan has served as a trustee of the National Humanities Center in Research Triangle Park, NC.

Jordan has shown a marked interest in pedagogy and edited single-volume and four-volume encyclopedias on the Middle Ages, aimed at the elementary and middle-school audiences respectively. He is the editor-in-chief of the first supplemental volume of the Dictionary of the Middle Ages.

Besides his scholarship on the Great Famine, Jordan is also known for his study of the reign of Louis IX of France, especially with respect to his Crusades. His Louis IX and the Challenge of the Crusade is "the most comprehensive secondary source account of the seventh crusade currently available" and has been cited by Frances Gies, Malcolm Barber, and Robert Chazan.

Jordan was elected as a member of the American Philosophical Society in 2000, and the American Academy of Arts and Sciences in 2009. He was awarded the prestigious Barry Prize for Distinguished Intellectual Achievement by the American Academy of Sciences and Letters in 2024.

== Publications ==
=== Books ===
- Louis IX and the Challenge of the Crusade: A Study in Rulership (Princeton University Press, 1980)
- From Servitude to Freedom: Manumission in the Senonais in the Thirteenth Century (University of Pennsylvania Press, 1986)
- The French Monarchy and the Jews from Philip Augustus to the Last Capetians (University of Pennsylvania Press, 1989)
- Women and Credit in Pre-Industrial and Developing Societies (University of Pennsylvania Press, 1992)
- The Great Famine: Northern Europe in the Early Fourteenth Century (Princeton University Press, 1996)
- Europe in the High Middle Ages (Penguin Books, 2002)
- A Tale of Two Monasteries: Westminster and Saint-Denis in the Thirteenth Century (Princeton University Press, 2009)
- Men at the Center. Redemptive Governance under Louis IX (Central European University Press, 2012)
- From England to France: Felony and Exile in the High Middle Ages (Princeton University Press, 2015)
- Unceasing Strife, Unending Fear: Jacques de Thérines and the Freedom of the Church in the Age of the Last Capetians (Princeton University Press, 2016)
- The Capetian Century, 1214-1314 with Jenna Rebecca Phillips (Brepols, 2017)
- The Apple of his Eye: Converts from Islam in the Reign of Louis IX (Princeton University Press, 2020)
- Servant of the Crown and steward of the Church: the career of Philippe of Cahors (University of Toronto Press, 2020)

=== Book chapters ===
- Learning about Jews in the Classroom: A Thirteenth-Century Witness, UCLA Library, Rouse MS 17, in Ra'anan S. Boustan, et al., eds., Envisioning Judaism: Studies in Honor of Peter Schäfer on the Occasion of his Seventieth Birthday, vol. 2 (Tübingen: Mohr Siebeck, 2013), pp. 1247–1260
- Jew and Serf in Medieval France Revisited, in Arnold E. Franklin, et al., eds., Jews, Christians, and Muslims in Medieval and Early Modern Times: A Festschrift in Honor of Mark R. Cohen (Brill, 2014), pp. 248–256.
- Introduction, in William Chester Jordan and Jenna Rebecca Phillips, eds., The Capetian Century, 1214-1314 (Brepols, 2017), pp. ix-xvi.
- Expenses Related to Corporal Punishment in France, in Craig Nakashian and Daniel Franke, eds., Prowess, Piety, and Public Order in Medieval Society: Studies in Honor of Richard W. Kaeuper (Brill, 2017), pp. 286–300.
- A Border Policy? Louis IX and the Spanish Connection, in Yuen-Gen Liang and Jarbel Rodriguez, eds., Authority and Spectacle in Medieval and Early Modern Europe: Essays in Honor of Teofilo F. Ruiz (Routledge, 2017), pp. 21–32.
- The Gleaners, in Thomas Barton, Susan McDonough, Sara McDougall, and Matthew Wranovix, eds., Boundaries in the Medieval and Wider World: Essays in Honour of Paul Freedman (Brepols, 2017), pp. 201–220.
- The Historical Afterlife of Two Capetian Co-Kings Who Predeceased Their Fathers, in Michael L. Bardot and Laurence W. Marvin, eds., Louis VII and His World (Brill, 2018), pp. 114–125.

=== Articles ===
- The Last Tormentor of Christ: An Image of the Jew in Ancient and Medieval Exegesis, Art, and Drama. Jewish Quarterly Review, New Series, Vol. 78, No. 1/2 (Jul.–Oct., 1987), pp. 21–47.
- The Erosion of the Stereotype of the Last Tormentor of Christ. Jewish Quarterly Review, New Series, Vol. 81, No. 1/2 (Jul.–Oct., 1990), pp. 13–44.
- Approaches to the Court Scene in The Bond Story: Equity and Mercy or Reason and Nature. Shakespeare Quarterly, Vol. 33, No. 1 (Spring, 1982), pp. 49–59.
- Jews, Regalian Rights, and the Constitution in Medieval France. Association for Jewish Studies Review, Vol. 23, No. 1 (1998), pp. 1–16.
