= Michael Herren =

Canadian historian

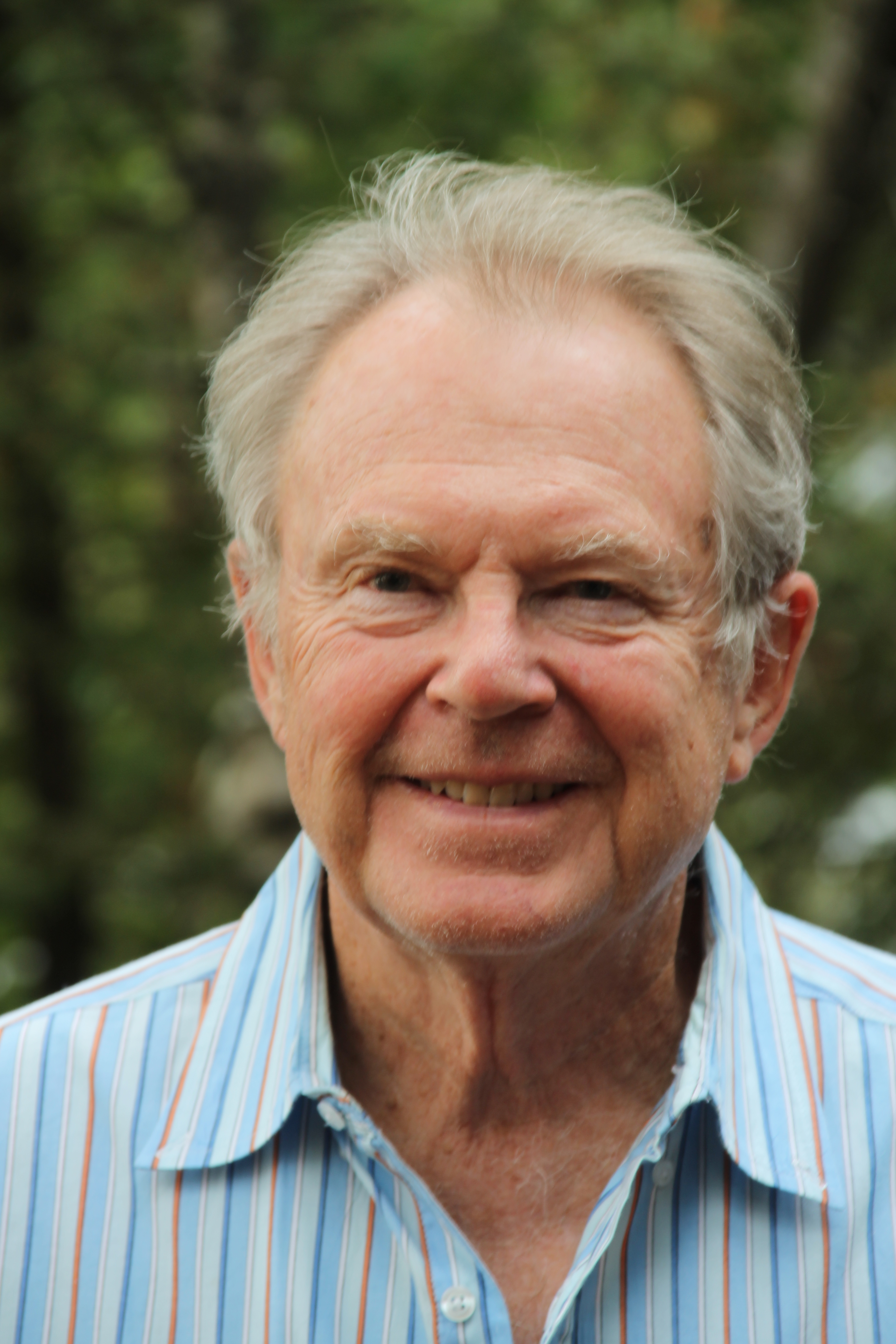

Academic background
- Education: PhD., University of Toronto
- Thesis: A philological commentary on the Hisperica famina (1969)

Academic work
- Institutions: York University

Michael Wayne Herren (born December 15, 1940 in Santa Ana, California) is a Canadian classical philologist and medievalist. He taught at York University in Toronto for almost four decades and most recently held the position of Distinguished Research Professor of History and Classics there.

== Education and career ==
Herren earned his Bachelor of Arts in the Humanities with a focus on Philosophy from Claremont McKenna College in 1962. In 1967, he completed his graduate studies with a Licentiate in Medieval Studies (Licentiatus Mediae Aetatis Studiorum) in the fields of Latin and Palaeography at the Pontifical Institute of Mediaeval Studies in Toronto. In 1969, Herren received his PhD in Classical Philology from the University of Toronto with a commentary on the Hisperica Famina. In 1974, he published an edition and translation of A-text of the Hisperica Faminam, whose origin he argues is Ireland.

At York University, where he spent most of his academic career, Herren founded the Program in Classical Studies at Atkinson College. He taught courses in the humanities and in Greek and Latin literature. For the last fifteen years of his full-time teaching career, he also supervised doctoral students in the graduate program in Medieval Studies at the University of Toronto.

In 1991, Herren founded the Journal of Medieval Latin, which quickly became a leading journal in the field of medieval Latin literature. He also co-founded the Publications of the Journal of Medieval Latin series, which has been published since 2001. Another project he initiated is the Epinal-Erfurt Glossary Editing Project, which aims to produce a critical edition of a Latin–Old English dictionary from the seventh century.

== Honors and awards ==
Awards and grants include:

- Humboldt Research Award (2013)
- Konrad Adenauer Award of the Royal Society of Canada (2003)
- Guggenheim Fellowship (1998)
- Killam Research Fellowship (1995)

Herren was elected a Fellow of the Royal Society of Canada in 1999, an Honorary Member of the Royal Irish Academy in 2002, and a Fellow of the Medieval Academy of America in 2010. Two Festschrifts, one for his 65th birthday in 2006 and another for his 80th birthday in 2021, honor his scholarly achievements.

== Publications ==
=== Monographs ===
- The Anatomy of Myth. The Art of Interpretation from the Presocratics to the Church Fathers. New York: Oxford University Press. 2017.
- The Cosmography of Aethicus Ister. Edition, translation and commentary. Turnhout: Brepols. 2011.
- Aldhelm. The Prose Works. Woodbridge: D. S. Brewer. 2009. ISBN 9780859910415. (with Michael Lapidge)
- Christ in Celtic Christianity Britain and Ireland from the Fifth to the Tenth Century. Woodbridge: D. S. Brewer. 2002. (with Shirley Ann Brown)
- Latin Letters in Early Christian Ireland. Variorum. 1996. ISBN 9780860785811. (collected essays)
- Iohannis Scotti Erivgenae Carmina. Dublin: Dublin Institute for Advanced Studies. 1993.
- The Hisperica Famina: A New Critical Edition with English Translation and Philological Commentary. Related poems. Volume 2. Studies and texts. Vol. 85. Toronto: Pontifical Institute of Mediaeval Studies. 1987. ISBN 9780888440310.
- The Hisperica Famina: A New Critical Edition with English Translation and Philological Commentary. Volume 1. Studies and texts. Vol. 31. Toronto: Pontifical Institute of Mediaeval Studies. 1974. ISBN 9780888440310.

=== Edited collections ===
- Herren, Michael; Brown, Shirley Ann, eds. (1988). The Sacred Nectar of the Greeks: the Study of Greek in the West in the Early Middle Ages. London: Boydell and Brewer. ISBN 9780951308516.
- Herren, Michael, ed. (1981). Insular Latin Studies. Papers on Latin texts and manuscripts of the British Isles: 550-1066. Toronto: Pontifical Institute of Mediaeval Studies. ISBN 9780888448019.
