= Dictionary of the Middle Ages =

Historical encyclopedia

Dictionary of the Middle Ages: Supplement 1 (2004)

The Dictionary of the Middle Ages is a 13-volume encyclopedia of the Middle Ages published by the American Council of Learned Societies between 1982 and 1989. It was first conceived and started in 1975 with American medieval historian Joseph Strayer of Princeton University as editor-in-chief. A "Supplement 1" was added in 2003 under the editorship of William Chester Jordan.

The encyclopedia covers over 112,000 persons, places, things and concepts of "legitimate scholarly interest" in 7,000 distinct articles in more than 8,000 pages written by over 1,800 contributing editors from academic institutions mainly in the United States but also Europe and Asia.

It is the largest and most detailed modern encyclopedia of the Middle Ages in the English language, comparable to the nine volume German Lexikon des Mittelalters.

The "upside-down-T in a circle" symbol on the spine and cover is an artistic interpretation of the T and O map, which was first described in the Etymologiae, the most influential encyclopedic work of the Middle Ages.
