= Old English Newsletter =

- Discipline: Old English philology, Anglo-Saxon history and culture
- Language: English
- Edited by: Stephen Harris

Publication details
- History: 1967–2026
- Publisher: University of Massachusetts

Standard abbreviations
- ISO 4: Old Engl. Newsl.

Indexing
- ISSN: 0030-1973
- LCCN: sf79010230
- OCLC no.: 02428532

Links
- Journal homepage; Recent and forthcoming publications; Online archive

The Old English Newsletter was a peer-reviewed academic journal established in 1967. It covered Anglo-Saxon studies and was published by the University of Massachusetts for the Old English Division of the Modern Language Association of America.

The journal published an annual Bibliography and Year's Work, which are widely relied upon. Many issues include obituaries of relevant scholars.

The online version contains an archive of several years of the journal's publications.

As of February, 2026, the journal has been discontinued due to a lack of "funding, volunteers, and contributors."

== History ==
When first established, the Old English Newsletter was published at Binghamton, New York, by the State University of New York's Center for Medieval and Renaissance Studies. In 1975, publication had transferred to the Ohio State University and in 2011 to the Department of English at the University of Tennessee. Until 2026, The journal was published by the Department of English at the University of Massachusetts, Amherst, still on behalf of the Old English Division of the Modern Language Association of America.

== Past editors ==
- 1967: Jess B. Bessinger, New York University, and Fred C. Robinson, Cornell (jointly)
- 1975: Stanley J. Kahrl
- 1977: Paul E. Szarmach
- 2011: Roy Liuzza, University of Tennessee
- 2026: Stephen Harris, University of Massachusetts, Amherst

== See also ==
- Anglo-Saxon England
