= Rosalind Love =

British historian, medievalist and academic (born 1966)

Rosalind Love FBA
- Born: 29 June 1966 (age 60); Chipping Sodbury, Gloucestershire, England

Academic background
- Education: St John's College, Cambridge
- Thesis: The texts, transmission and circulation of some eleventh-century Anglo-Latin saints' lives (1993)

Academic work
- Discipline: Medieval literature
- Sub-discipline: Insular Latin; Anglo-Latin literature; Old English literature; Venerable Bede; hagiography
- Institutions: Robinson College, Cambridge; Department of Anglo-Saxon, Norse and Celtic, University of Cambridge

Rosalind Claire Love FBA (born 29 June 1966) is a British historian, medievalist, and academic. She has been a Fellow of Robinson College, Cambridge since 1993, and Elrington and Bosworth Professor of Anglo-Saxon in the Department of Anglo-Saxon, Norse and Celtic at the University of Cambridge since 2019.

== Early life and education ==
Love was born on 29 June 1966 in Chipping Sodbury, Gloucestershire, England. She was educated at Haberdashers' Monmouth School for Girls, an independent school in Monmouth, Wales. She studied classics and then Anglo-Saxon, Norse, and Celtic at St John's College, Cambridge, graduating with a Bachelor of Arts (BA) degree in 1984. She undertook postgraduate research in Anglo-Saxon, Norse, and Celtic, and submitted her doctoral thesis "The texts, transmission and circulation of some eleventh-century Anglo-Latin saints' lives" in 1993.

== Academic career ==
In 1993, Love was elected a fellow of Robinson College, Cambridge. In 2000, she also became a lecturer in the Department of Anglo-Saxon, Norse and Celtic, University of Cambridge. She was promoted to senior lecturer in 2008 and made Reader in Insular Latin in 2012. She was Head of Department in 2015. In November 2018, it was announced that she would be the next Elrington and Bosworth Professor of Anglo-Saxon, in succession to Simon Keynes: she took up the chair on 1 October 2019. In 2024, she was elected a Fellow of the British Academy.

Love is an editorial board member of the Richard Rawlinson Center Series for Anglo-Saxon Studies, an imprint of De Gruyter, an editor for the Oxford University Press imprint Oxford Medieval Texts, and the publications secretary for the Henry Bradshaw Society.

Love has published on Anglo-Latin medieval hagiography (saints' lives) and chronicle writing. With Simon Keynes, she examined the Vita Ædwardi regis, an 11th-century text, which gives an account of the reign of King Edward the Confessor.

In July 2024, Love was elected as a Fellow of the British Academy.

== Personal life ==
Love has been married to Nicholas Moir, an Anglican priest, since 1998, and they have two children.

== Selected works ==
- Love, Rosalind C. (1996). Three eleventh-century Anglo-Latin saints' lives: Vita S. Birini, Vita et miracula S. Kenelmi, and Vita S. Rumwoldi. Oxford: Clarendon Press. ISBN 0198205244.
- Love, Rosalind C. (2004). Goscelin of Saint-Bertin: the hagiography of the female saints of Ely. Oxford: Clarendon. ISBN 9780198208150.
- Love, Rosalind C. (2005). "The Life of St Wulfsige of Sherborne by Goscelin of Saint-Bertin: A New Translation with Introduction, Appendix and Notes". In Barker, Katherine; Hunt, Alan (eds.). St Wulfsige and Sherborne. Oxbow Books Limited. pp. 98–123. ISBN 978-1-84217-175-2.
- Keynes, Simon; Love, Rosalind (2009). "Earl Godwine's ship". Anglo-Saxon England. 38. Cambridge University Press (CUP): 185–223. doi:10.1017/s0263675109990044. ISSN 0263-6751.
