= Joseph Strayer =

American historian

Joseph Reese Strayer (born August 20, 1904, Baltimore, Maryland, – died July 2, 1987, Princeton, New Jersey) was an American medievalist who taught for nearly his entire career at Princeton University and chaired the history department there for 20 years (1942–1962). He is regarded as one of the most influential American medieval scholars of the 20th century, particularly in terms of the number of students he trained who went on to define the field of medieval history in the United States for many decades thereafter. His primary scholarly interests lay in the legal and administrative institutions of the kingdom of France under the Capetian monarchs, as well as England under the Norman and Angevin dynasties.

== Life and teaching career ==
Strayer was born in Baltimore and raised in New York City, where he attended the Horace Mann School. He received a B.A. from Princeton University in 1925 and a Ph.D. from Harvard University in 1930, under the supervision of Charles Homer Haskins. After teaching for one year at Stevens Institute of Technology in Hoboken, he returned to Princeton in 1931 as an assistant professor, eventually rising to full professor and chair of the history department, a position which he held from 1942 to 1962. He served as president of the Medieval Academy of America from 1966 to 1969 and of the American Historical Association in 1971. Strayer was an elected member of both the American Academy of Arts and Sciences and the American Philosophical Society. Strayer retired from teaching in 1973, but remained an active scholar well into his later years.

Strayer has been credited with training a large percentage of the American medievalist profession in the liberal tradition; many of his students are still teaching and active. Some notable scholars whom Strayer trained at Princeton include: John F. Benton, Thomas N. Bisson, Norman F. Cantor, Bennett D. Hill, William Chester Jordan, Richard W. Kaeuper, and Teofilo Ruiz.

Strayer was married twice. His first wife, Lois, with whom he had one son and one daughter, died in 1984. In 1986, he married another retired medievalist, Sylvia Thrupp (1903–1997), a noted scholar of English social and economic history. He died in Princeton the following year after a brief illness.

== Scholarship ==
Strayer inherited from Haskins a strong commitment to Wilsonian progressivism, and viewed history through the lens of the evolution of governmental institutions and law. Strayer's longstanding interest in medieval feudal institutions and kingship lay in their role in shaping the emergence of later nation-states in Europe and North America. Strayer famously described feudalism as "public power in private hands" and saw the centralizing activities of medieval monarchies as attempts to reverse this fragmentation and create a more stable order around the state, thereby restoring the notion of a commonwealth and the public good. Norman Cantor recognized three books as most important to Strayer's legacy: Feudalism (1965), which summarized three decades of his research and thinking on the topic; On the Medieval Origins of the Modern State (1970), in which he shows the relevance of medieval historical institutions to modern governmental institutions; and The Reign of Philip the Fair (1980), representing over 30 years of archival research and the most comprehensive work on the topic in any language – other than Jean Favier's Philippe le Bel (1978). Strayer was editor of the Dictionary of the Middle Ages, the largest and most comprehensive encyclopedia on the subject in the English language.

== Work for the CIA ==
Strayer was engaged in intelligence work for many years during the Cold War as a consulting analyst with the CIA's Office of National Estimates. The extent of his involvement, at a time when the CIA was running covert operations to destabilize governments around the world (Iran, Brazil, Congo, Dominican Republic, Guyana and Chile), has never been fully assessed or verified. Strayer, who had known the agency's first director, Allen Dulles, from his undergraduate days at Princeton, never revealed any details about his activities but told colleagues that he had been recruited as a consultant because Dulles knew that a medievalist would be skilled at gleaning critical information from sparse or fragmentary sources.

== Bibliography ==
- Administration of Normandy Under Saint Louis (1932)
- The Middle Ages, 395–1500 (1942) – an extended textbook survey. Originally co-authored by Dana C. Munro in 1942, by the 1959 4th edition it was mostly all Strayer. Cantor says it is important for "its brilliant summary of European political history from about 1050 to 1350".
  - Western Europe in the Middle Ages: a Short History (1955) – a brief version of the above, reprinted in later editions.
- The Interpretation of History (1950)
- The Course of Civilization (1961)
- Feudalism (1965)
- On the Medieval Origins of the Modern State (1970)
- Medieval statecraft and the perspectives of history (1971)
- The Albigensian Crusade (1972)
- The Royal Domain in the Bailliage of Rouen (1976)
- The Reign of Philip the Fair (1980)
- Dictionary of the Middle Ages, editor (1982 to 1989)
