= Michael Lapidge =

Scholar

Michael Lapidge (born 8 February 1942) is a scholar in the field of Medieval Latin literature, particularly that composed in Anglo-Saxon England during the period 600–1100 AD; he is an emeritus Fellow of Clare College, Cambridge, a Fellow of the British Academy, and winner of the 2009 Sir Israel Gollancz Prize.

== Education and career ==
Lapidge completed his B.A. at the University of Calgary and taught there for three years after completing an M.A. (U of Alberta), before going to the University of Toronto in 1967 to begin work on a Ph.D. in the Centre for Medieval Studies. His doctoral dissertation, supervised by Brian Stock, studied the transmission of a nexus of cosmological metaphors, first articulated by Greek Stoic philosophers, to classical and late antique Latin poets, and ultimately to Medieval Latin philosophers and poets of the twelfth century. After completing course-work in Toronto, he went to Cambridge in 1969 to have better access to manuscript depositories while completing his dissertation. The Ph.D. was awarded in 1971.

Following a period as a Research Fellow in Cambridge supported by a Killam Senior Research Fellowship, Lapidge was appointed Lecturer in the Department of Anglo-Saxon, Norse and Celtic, University of Cambridge in 1974, thereafter progressing to be Reader in Insular Latin Literature (1988) and then, in 1991, Elrington and Bosworth Professor of Anglo-Saxon, a chair which he held until 1998. During this time he was able, as Head of department, to increase the size of the department and to introduce a number of significant structural changes to its teaching programme. He resigned the Professorship in 1999 in order to become Notre Dame Professor of English at the University of Notre Dame, a position he held until taking early retirement in 2004.

== Publications ==
Lapidge has written or edited more than fifty books and published some 200 articles, on subjects ranging from Greek cosmology and Classical Latin literature to medieval palaeography and textual criticism, especially the literature of Anglo-Saxon England, in both Latin and Old English. He is, for instance, an expert on the Leiden Glossary. He has devoted much of his scholarly energy to editing scholarly journals and series, having been general editor for many years of Anglo-Saxon England, Oxford Medieval Texts, Scriptores Latini Hiberniae, and Henry Bradshaw Society Publications, as well as Compendium Auctorum Latinorum Medii Aevi (C.A.L.M.A.) and Cambridge Studies in Anglo-Saxon England (both of which he founded). In 2002, he delivered the Triennial E. A. Lowe Lectures at Corpus Christi College, University of Oxford, speaking on the topic of "The Anglo-Saxon Library"; a revised version of his lectures was published by Oxford University Press.

== Awards ==
Lapidge was awarded the 2009 Sir Israel Gollancz Prize from the British Academy for his work as "a world authority on Anglo-Saxon literature." He was awarded the degree of Doctor of Letters (Litt.D.) by the University of Cambridge in 1987; in 2011 he was awarded the honorary degree of D.Litt. by the University of Toronto. He is a corresponding fellow both of the Bayerische Akademie der Wissenschaften (Munich) and the Accademia dei Lincei (Rome) and is vice-president of the International Society for the Study of Medieval Latin Culture (SISMEL).

== Bibliography ==
- Aldhelm: The Prose Works, trans. with Michael Herren (Ipswich: Brewer, 1979).
- Alfred the Great, trans. with Simon Keynes (Harmondsworth: Penguin, 1983).
- Gildas: New Approaches, ed. with David Dumville (Woodbridge: Boydell Press, 1984).
- Aldhelm: The Poetic Works, trans. with James L. Rosier (Woodbridge: D. S. Brewer, 1985).
- Learning and literature in Anglo-Saxon England: Studies presented to Peter Clemoes on the Occasion of his Sixty-fifth Birthday, ed. with Helmut Gneuss (Cambridge: Cambridge University Press, 1985).
- A Bibliography of Celtic Latin Literature 400–1200, with Richard Sharpe (Dublin: Royal Irish Academy, 1985).
- Cambridge Companion to Old English Literature, ed. with Malcolm Godden (Cambridge: Cambridge University Press, 1999, 2013).
- Wulfstan of Winchester: The Life of St Æthelwold, ed. with Michael Winterbottom (Oxford: Clarendon Press, 1991).
- Anglo-Saxon Litanies of the Saints (Woodbridge: Published for the Henry Bradshaw Society by Boydell Press, 1991).
- Anglo-Latin Literature 900–1066, (London: Hambledon Press, 1993).
- Biblical Commentaries from the Canterbury School of Theodore and Hadrian, ed. with Bernhard Bischoff (Cambridge: Cambridge University Press, 1994).
- Archbishop Theodore: Commemorative Studies on his Life and Influence, ed. Michael Lapidge (Cambridge: Cambridge University Press, 1995).
- Byrhtferth’s Enchiridion, ed. with Peter S. Baker (Oxford: Oxford University Press, 1995).
- Anglo-Latin Literature 600–899 (London: Hambledon Press, 1996).
- Studies in Early Mediaeval Latin Glossaries, by W. M. Lindsay, ed. Michael Lapidge (Aldershot: Variorum, 1996).
- Columbanus: Studies on the Latin Writings (ed.) (Woodbridge: Boydell Press, 1997).
- Collectanea Pseudo-Bedae, ed. with Martha Bayless et al. (Dublin: Dublin Institute, 1998).
- The Blackwell encyclopaedia of Anglo-Saxon England, ed. Michael Lapidge et al. (Oxford: Blackwell, 1999).
- Apomnēmoneumata: Recollections of a Medieval Latinist by F. J. E. Raby, ed. Michael Lapidge (Firenze: SISMEL - Edizioni del Galluzzo, 2002).
- Interpreters of Early Medieval Britain (ed.) (Oxford: Oxford University Press, 2002).
- The Cult of St Swithun, (Oxford: Clarendon Press, 2003).
- Aspects of the Language of Latin Prose, ed. Tobias Reinhardt, Michael Lapidge and J. N. Adams (Oxford: Oxford University Press, 2005).
- Histoire ecclésiastique du peuple anglais: Historia ecclesiastica gentis Anglorum by Bède, introduction and notes by André Crépin, edition by Michael Lapidge, trans. Pierre Monat and Philippe Robin (Paris: Cerf, 2005).
- The Anglo-Saxon Library (Oxford: Oxford University Press, 2006). ISBN 0-19-926722-7
- Storia degli inglesi: Historia ecclesiastica gentis Anglorum by Beda; a cura di Michael Lapidge; traduzione di Paolo Chiesa, 2 vols. (Rome: Fondazione Lorenzo Valla; Milan: A. Mondadori, 2008–2010).
- Byrhtferth of Ramsey: The Lives of St Oswald and St Ecgwine (ed. and trans) (Oxford: Clarendon Press, 2009).
- The Early Lives of St Dunstan, ed. and trans. with Michael Winterbottom (Oxford: Clarendon Press, 2012).
- Anglo-Saxon Manuscripts: A Bibliographical Handlist of Manuscripts and Manuscript Fragments written or owned in England up to 1100, with Helmet Gneuss (Toronto: University of Toronto Press, 2014).
- H. M. Chadwick and the Study of Anglo-Saxon, Norse and Celtic in Cambridge (ed.) (CMCS, Department of Welsh, Aberystwyth University, 2015).
- Hilduin of Saint-Denis: The Passio S. Dionysii in Prose and Verse (Leiden: Brill, 2017).
- The Roman Martyrs (Oxford: Oxford University Press, 2018).
- Bede's Latin Poetry (Oxford: Oxford University Press, 2019).
- Byrhtferth of Ramsey: Historia regum (Oxford: Oxford University Press, 2022).
- Canterbury Glosses from the School of Theodore and Hadrian: The Leiden Glossary, 2 vols. (Turnhout: Brepols, 2023).
- Martiri di Roma, vols. I-II (Milan: Mondadori, 2024-25).
