= The Review of English Studies =

- Discipline: Literature
- Language: English
- Edited by: Thomas Keymer, Colin Burrow, Elaine Treharne, Michael Whitworth

Publication details
- History: 1925–present
- Publisher: Oxford University Press (United Kingdom)
- Frequency: 5/year

Standard abbreviations
- ISO 4: Rev. Engl. Stud.

Indexing
- ISSN: 0034-6551 (print); 1471-6968 (web)
- LCCN: 30031955
- JSTOR: 00346551
- OCLC no.: 643481321

Links
- Journal homepage; Online archive

The Review of English Studies is a peer-reviewed academic journal covering English literature and language from the earliest period to the present and published by Oxford University Press. RES is a "leading scholarly journal of English literature and the English language" whose critical "[e]mphasis is on historical scholarship rather than interpretative criticism, though fresh readings of authors and texts are also offered in light of newly discovered sources or new interpretation of known material."
