= Nora K. Chadwick =

British philologist (1891–1972)

- Born: Nora Kershaw; 28 January 1891; Lancashire, England
- Died: 24 April 1972 (aged 81); Cambridge, England
- Occupation: Medievalist
- Notable work: The Druids

Nora Kershaw Chadwick CBE FSA FBA (28 January 1891 – 24 April 1972) was an English philologist who specialised in Anglo-Saxon, Celtic and Old Norse studies.

== Early life and education ==
Nora Kershaw was born in Lancashire in 1891, the first daughter of James Kershaw and Emma Clara Booth, married in 1888. Nora's sister Mabel, born in 1895, converted to Catholicism and became a Carmelite nun.

She received her undergraduate degree from Newnham College, Cambridge (where she was later an Honorary Life Fellow) and lectured at St Andrews during World War I. She returned to Cambridge in 1919 to study Anglo-Saxon and Old Norse under Professor Hector Munro Chadwick. They were married in 1922. Nora's mother and stepfather and Enid Welsford were the only wedding guests.

The Chadwicks turned their home into a literary salon, a tradition which Mrs. Chadwick maintained after the death of her husband in 1947.

== Career ==
Most of her life was spent on research, in her later years primarily on the Celts. She was University Lecturer in the Early History and Culture of the British Isles at the University of Cambridge from 1950 to 1958. She received honorary degrees from the University of Wales, the National University of Ireland and the University of St Andrews, and was made Commander of the Order of the British Empire in 1961. In 1965 she delivered the British Academy's Sir John Rhŷs Memorial Lecture.

Chadwick took an interdisciplinary approach and wrote on many topics; she demonstrated influentially the study of multiple "early cultures of north-west Europe" and brought comparative evidence to bear on heroic literature. Nora Chadwick is best known for her work on the Celts, particularly on the earliest period.

== Bequest ==
Nora Chadwick died in Cambridge; she left a sum to the University of Cambridge to endow a readership in Celtic Studies.

== Publications ==
She published the first full English translation of Hervarar saga ok Heiðreks together with other sagas and ballads in Stories and Ballads of the Far Past (1921), as well as a translation of the poem Hlöðskviða found within Heidrik's saga.

- Kershaw, Nora (1921), Stories and Ballads of the Far Past, Cambridge University Press, pp. 79–150, e-text
- Kershaw, N., ed. (1922), "13. The Battle of the Goths and the Huns", Anglo-Saxon and Norse poems, Cambridge [Eng.] The University press

With her husband, she published the three volume work The Growth of Literature between 1932–40.

- The Ancient Literatures of Europe, vol. I, 1932
- Russian Oral Literature, Yugoslav Oral Poetry, Early Indian Literature, Early Hebrew Literature, vol. II, 1936
- The Oral Literature of the Tatars and Polynesia, etc., vol. III, 1940

She also wrote The Beginnings of Russian History, an enquiry into sources (1946).

Chadwick collaborated with V. M. Zhirmunsky on a revision of the part of volume III that deals with epic poetry in Central Asian languages. The revised text was published separately in 1969 as Oral Epics of Central Asia.

In 1955 she published Poetry and Letters in early Christian Gaul.

Chadwick wrote about Celtic Britain and Breton history, and collaborated with Myles Dillon and Kenneth H. Jackson.

- Early Scotland (1949); Introduction, pages xi–xxvi, by Nora Kershaw Chadwick
- Studies in Early British History (editor and co-author, 1954)
- Celtic Britain (ancient people and places) (1963)
- The Age of Saints in the Celtic Church (1964)
- The Colonization of Brittany from Celtic Britain (1965)
- The Druids (1966)
- The Celtic Realms (1967, with Myles Dillon)
- The Celts (1970, with an introductory chapter by Dr. J.X.W.P. Corcoran: 'The Origins of the Celts: The Archaeological Evidence') 1997 pbk edition

On Anglo-Saxon language and literature:

- The Study of Anglo-Saxon (1955, with her husband)
- "The Monsters and Beowulf" (1960), in which she suggests that the monsters in Beowulf are drawn entirely from Scandinavian tradition.

A list of the publications of Hector and Nora Chadwick was printed for her 80th birthday in 1971.
