= Dorothy Whitelock =

English historian

Professor Dorothy Whitelock CBE FSA FRHistS FBA
- Born: 11 November 1901; Leeds, Yorkshire, England
- Died: 14 August 1982 (aged 80); Cambridge, England

Academic background
- Education: Leeds Girls' High School
- Alma mater: Newnham College, Cambridge

Academic work
- Discipline: History
- Sub-discipline: Anglo-Saxons; Old English
- Institutions: St Hilda's College, Oxford; Newnham College, Cambridge
- Notable students: Nicholas Brooks; Simon Keynes

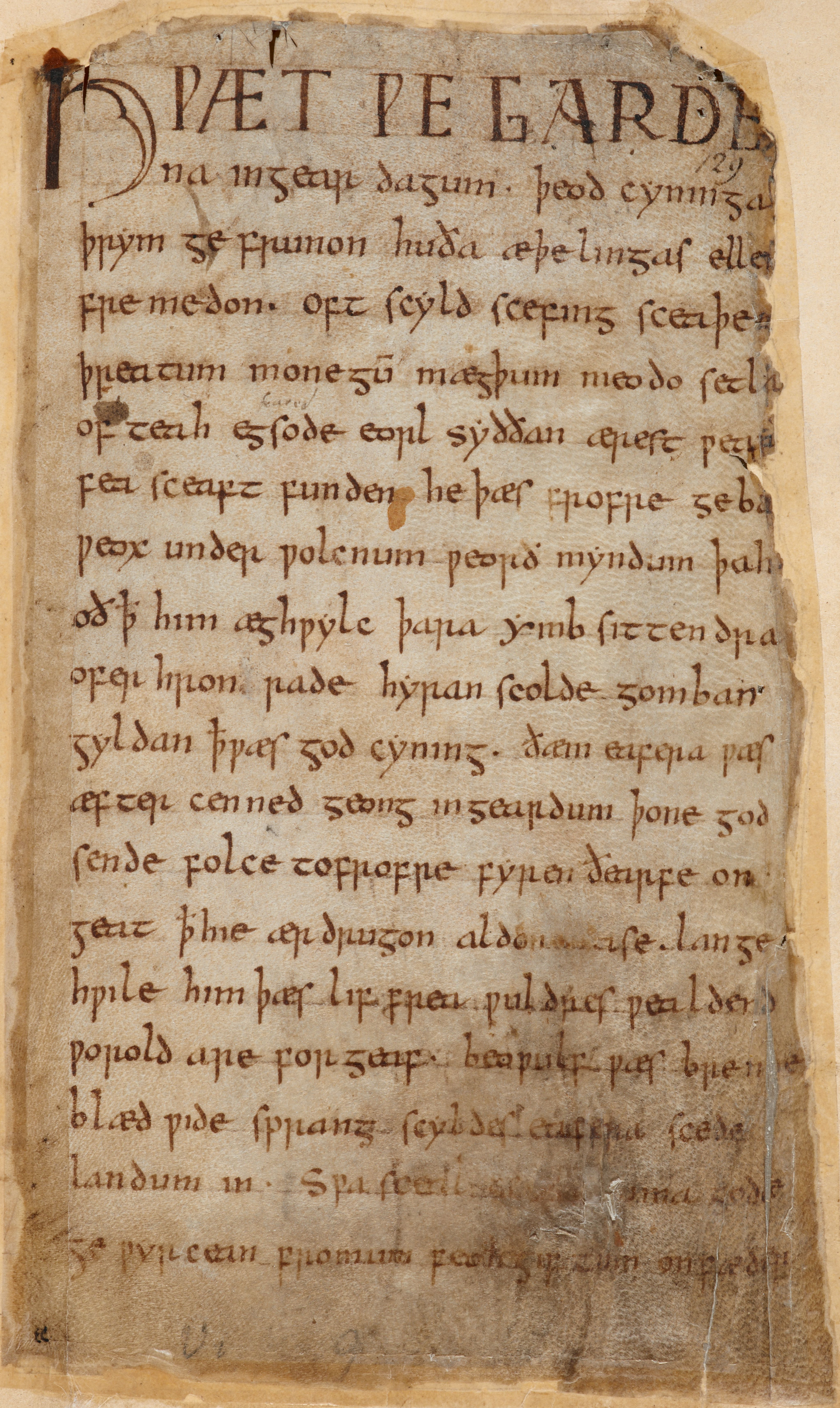
First page of the fire-damaged Beowulf manuscript in the British Library. 'Nowell Codex', Cotton Vitellius A.x.v. 129 r.

Dorothy Whitelock (11 November 1901 – 14 August 1982) was an English historian. From 1957 to 1969, she was the Elrington and Bosworth Professor of Anglo-Saxon at the University of Cambridge. Her best-known work is English Historical Documents, vol. I: c. 500–1042, which she edited. It is a compilation of translated sources, with introductions.

Her other works include The Beginnings of English Society (1952), After Bede (1960), The Anglo-Saxon Chronicle – A Revised Translation (1961), The Audience of Beowulf (1951), and Genuine Asser (1967), in which she argued against V. H. Galbraith's assertion that Asser's Life of King Alfred was a forgery by Leofric.

== Early life ==
Whitelock was born in Leeds to Edward Whitelock and his second wife Emmeline Dawson. Edward died in 1903 but despite financial struggles, Dorothy Whitelock was able to attend the Leeds Girls' High School. Whitelock was a promising student at school and it came as no surprise when in 1921 she went up to Newnham College, Cambridge at the age of 19, where she was one of only four students in her year to study for Section B of the English Tripos under Hector Munro Chadwick. She gained a First in Part I and a Second in Part II.

== Academic career ==
Whitelock went on to postgraduate work, as Marion Kennedy Student at Newnham (1924–26), Cambridge University Scandinavian Student at Uppsala (1927–29), and the first woman to receive the Allen Scholarship at Cambridge (1929–30). These labours led to her first book, her 1930 translation and commentary on thirty-nine Anglo-Saxon wills. In the same year, she became a Fellow of the Royal Historical Society (she was later elected to its council from 1945 to 1948).

In 1930 Whitelock became a lecturer in English language at St Hilda's College, Oxford (tutor in 1935, full fellow 1937, vice principal 1951). In 1940, she was elected a Leverhulme Fellow and in 1946 became a University Lecturer in Old English at Oxford. In 1945, she became a Fellow of the Society of Antiquaries. She served as President of the Viking Society for Northern Research in 1940–1. She was elected vice-president of the Society for Medieval Archaeology from its formation in 1957, serving until 1963. In 1957, she returned to Cambridge, and Newnham, as the Elrington and Bosworth Professor of Anglo-Saxon.

Notwithstanding these successes, Whitelock found herself frustrated by a male-dominated academy which often favoured male scholars at the expense of talented female academics. In 1945, following her failure to secure a professorship at the University of Liverpool, Whitelock applied for the Rawlinson and Bosworth professorship of Anglo-Saxon at the University of Oxford, a chair that had been vacated by J. R. R. Tolkien. She was unsuccessful; Tolkien himself had voted against her. In the face of such opposition, she was tempted to abandon the academy altogether but her close friends, the leading Anglo-Saxon historians Sir Frank Stenton and his wife Doris, addressed a series of supportive letters to her, encouraging her to persevere. A key part of her work was lobbying for Oxford's women's colleges to have the same status as men's, finally achieved only in 1959.

During the 1950s, Whitelock returned to her work with renewed vigour, producing a series of important works culminating with her most famous book, English Historical Documents in 1955. Her achievements were finally recognised in 1956, when she was elected a fellow of the British Academy. In 1957, Whitelock returned to Cambridge, where she had begun her career, succeeding Bruce Dickins as Elrington and Bosworth Professor of Anglo-Saxon (in which capacity she supervised Simon Keynes, who himself was the Elrington and Bosworth Professor between 1999 and 2018). Under her direction, the 'Department of Anglo-Saxon and Kindred Studies' relocated in 1967 from the Faculty of Archaeology and Anthropology to the Faculty of English and became the Department of Anglo-Saxon, Norse and Celtic. A photograph of her hangs on the wall there.

Whitelock was appointed CBE in the 1964 Birthday Honours.

Whitelock retired in 1969, but continued to publish scholarship and serve the academic community, chairing the Sylloge Committee from 1967 to 1978 and elected a President of the English Place Name Society from 1967 to 1979. In her later years she lived with her sister. She had strokes in 1980 and 1981, and died on 14 August 1982.
