= Peter Clemoes =

British historian

Peter Alan Martin Clemoes
- Born: 20 January 1920
- Died: 16 March 1996 (aged 76)
- Occupation: Historian

Peter Alan Martin Clemoes (20 January 1920 – 16 March 1996) was a British historian.

== Biography ==
Peter Clemoes was born in Southend-on-Sea and educated at Brentwood School. He originally wished to become an actor and won a scholarship to RADA but the Second World War intervened and he served with the Royal Corps of Signals.

After the war he took a degree in English from Queen Mary College, London, which was followed by postgraduate work on Anglo-Saxon at King's College, Cambridge, gaining a PhD in 1956. He then held a research fellowship at the University of Reading until 1961 when he returned to Cambridge under Dorothy Whitelock, whom he replaced as Elrington and Bosworth Professor of Anglo-Saxon in the Department of Anglo-Saxon, Norse and Celtic in 1969.

Clemoes would take an early retirement from the university in 1982. He died in 1996, at the age of 76, at his home in Chesterton.

== Anglo-Saxon England ==
Clemoes was the editor of the journal Anglo-Saxon England, an annual survey of the literature on the subject, which also included a number of substantial papers.

== Works ==
- Clemoes, Peter, ed. (1955). Aelfric's Catholic Homilies (The First Series ed.).
- Clemoes, Peter (1995). Interactions of Thought and Language in Old English Poetry. Cambridge University Press. ISBN 978-0-521-30711-6.
