= Celtic Christianity =

Christianity in the Celtic language–speaking world during the early Middle Ages

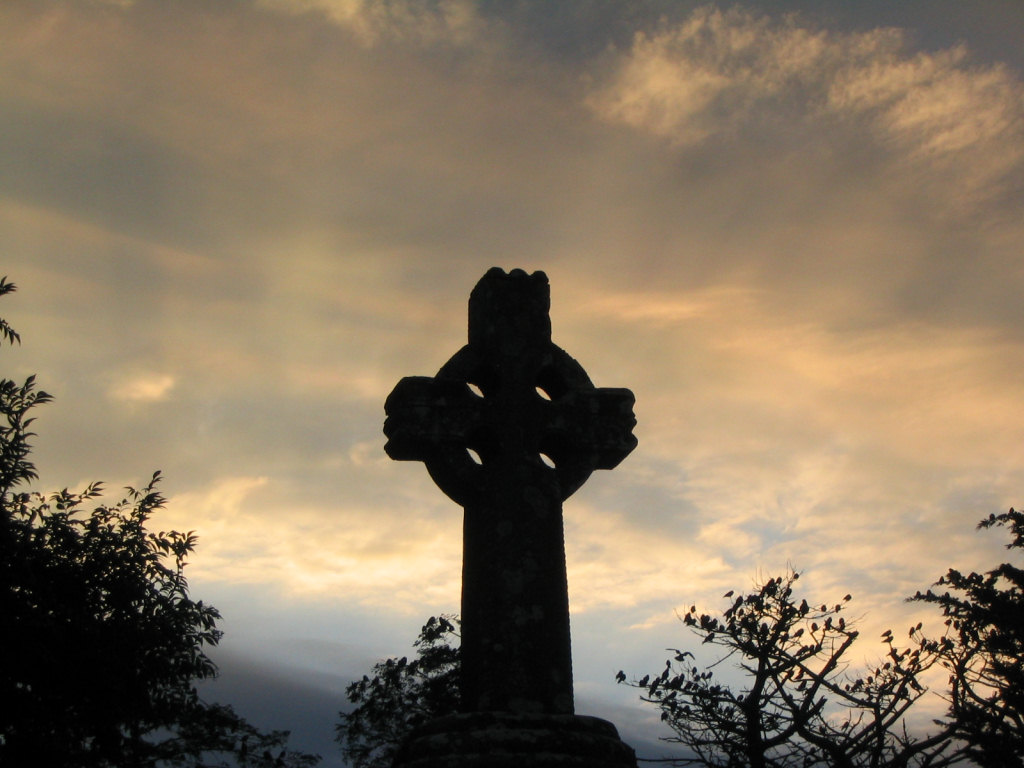
A Celtic Cross in Knock, Ireland

Celtic Christianity is a term previously used by historians for a form of Christianity which was held to have been common across the Celtic-speaking world during the Early Middle Ages. The term is deprecated by most late twentieth and twenty-first century historians as it wrongly implies a unified and identifiable entity separate from that of mainstream Western Christendom. For this reason, Brown (2003) notes a preference for the term Insular Christianity. As Patrick Wormald explained, "One of the common misconceptions is that there was a Roman Church to which the Celtic Church was nationally opposed."

Some writers have described a distinct "Celtic Church" uniting the Celtic peoples and distinguishing them from adherents of the Roman Church, while others classify Celtic Christianity as a set of distinctive practices occurring in those areas. Varying scholars reject the former notion, but note that there were certain traditions and practices present in both the Irish and British churches that were not seen in the wider Christian world.

Such practices include: a distinctive system for determining the dating of Easter, a style of monastic tonsure, a unique system of penance, and the popularity of going into "exile for Christ". Additionally, there were other practices that developed in certain parts of Great Britain and Ireland that were not known to have spread beyond particular regions. The term typically denotes the regional practices among the insular churches and their associates rather than actual theological differences.

Popularized by German historian Lutz von Padberg, the term "Iroschottisch" is used to describe this supposed dichotomy between Irish-Scottish and Roman Christianity. As a whole, Celtic-speaking areas were part of Latin Christendom at a time when there was significant regional variation of liturgy and structure. But a general collective veneration of the Papacy was no less intense in Celtic-speaking areas.

Nonetheless, distinctive traditions developed and spread to both Ireland and Great Britain, especially in the 6th and 7th centuries. Some elements may have been introduced to Ireland by the Romano-British Saint Patrick, and later, others from Ireland to Great Britain through the Irish mission system of Saint Columba. However, the histories of the churches of the Irish, Welsh, Scots, Breton, Cornish, and Manx peoples diverge significantly after the 8th century. Interest in the subject has led to a series of Celtic Christian Revival movements, which have shaped popular perceptions of the Celts and their Christian religious practices.

== Definitions ==
People have conceived of "Celtic Christianity" in different ways at different times. Writings on the topic frequently say more about the time in which they originate than about the historical state of Christianity in the early medieval Celtic-speaking world, and many notions are now discredited in modern academic discourse. One particularly prominent feature ascribed to Celtic Christianity is that it is supposedly inherently distinct from – and generally opposed to – the Catholic Church. Other common claims include that Celtic Christianity denied the authority of the Pope, was less authoritarian than the Catholic Church, more spiritual, friendlier to women, more connected with nature, and more comfortable dealing with Celtic polytheism. One view, which gained substantial scholarly traction in the 19th century, was that there was a "Celtic Church", a significant organised Christian body or denomination uniting the Celtic peoples and separating them from the "Roman" church of continental Europe. An example of this appears in Toynbee's Study of History (1934–1961), which identified Celtic Christianity with an "Abortive Far Western Civilization" – the nucleus of a new society, which was prevented from taking root by the Roman Church, Vikings, and Normans. Others have been content to speak of "Celtic Christianity" as consisting of certain traditions and beliefs intrinsic to the Celts.

However, modern scholars have identified problems with all of these claims, and find the term "Celtic Christianity" problematic in and of itself. Modern scholarship roundly rejects the idea of a "Celtic Church" due to the lack of substantiating evidence. Indeed, distinct Irish and British church traditions existed, each with their own practices, and there was significant local variation even within the individual Irish and British spheres. While the Irish and British churches had some traditions in common, these were relatively few. Even these commonalities did not exist due to the "Celticity" of the regions, but due to other historical and geographical factors. Additionally, the Christians of Ireland and Britain were not "anti-Roman"; Celtic areas respected the authority of Rome and the papacy as strongly as any other region of Europe. Caitlin Corning further notes that the "Irish and British were no more pro-women, pro-environment, or even more spiritual than the rest of the Church."

== Developing image of Celtic Christianity ==
Corning writes that scholars have identified three major strands of thought that have influenced the popular conceptions of Celtic Christianity:

- The first arose in the English Reformation, when the Church of England declared itself separate from papal authority. Protestant writers of this time popularised the idea of an indigenous British Christianity that opposed the foreign "Roman" church and was purer (and proto-Protestant) in thought. The English church, they claimed, was not forming a new institution, but casting off the shackles of Rome and returning to its true roots as the indigenous national church of Britain.
- The Romantic movement of the 18th century, in particular Romantic notions of the noble savage and the intrinsic qualities of the "Celtic race", further influenced ideas about Celtic Christianity. Romantics idealised the Celts as a primitive, bucolic people who were far more poetic, spiritual, and freer of rationalism than their neighbours. The Celts were seen as having an inner spiritual nature that shone through even after their form of Christianity had been destroyed by the authoritarian and rational Rome.
- In the 20th and 21st centuries, ideas about "Celtic Christians" combined with appeals by certain modern churches, modern pagan groups, and New Age groups seeking to recover something of ancient spirituality that they believe is missing from the modern world. For these groups, Celtic Christianity becomes a cipher for whatever is lost in the modern religious experience. Corning notes that these notions say more about modern desires than about the reality of Christianity in the Early Middle Ages.

Some associate the early Christians of Celtic-speaking Galatia (purportedly recipients of Paul's Epistle to the Galatians) with later Christians of north-western Europe's Celtic fringe.

== History ==
=== Britain ===
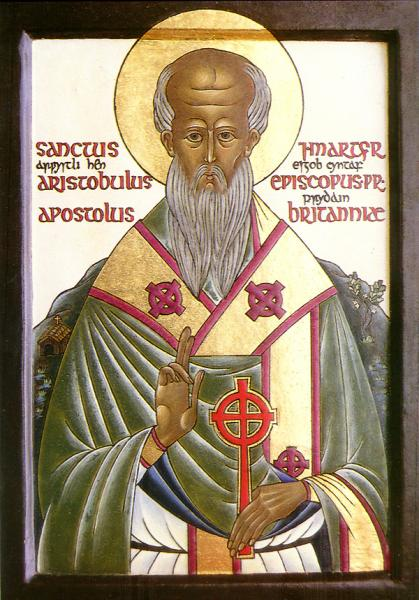
Modern icon of Aristobulus of Britannia

According to medieval traditions, Christianity arrived in Britain in the 1st century. Gildas's 6th-century account dated its arrival to the latter part of the reign of the Roman emperor Tiberius; an account of the seventy disciples discovered at Mount Athos in 1854 lists Aristobulus as "bishop of Britain". Medieval accounts of King Lucius, Fagan and Deruvian, and Joseph of Arimathea, however, are now usually accounted as pious frauds.

The earliest certain historical evidence of Christianity among the Britons is found in the writings of such early Christian Fathers as Tertullian and Origen in the first years of the 3rd century, although the first Christian communities probably were established at least some decades earlier.

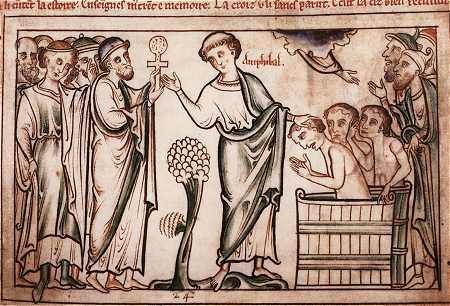
Amphibalus baptizing converts, from The Life of St. Alban, written and illustrated by Matthew Paris († 1259)

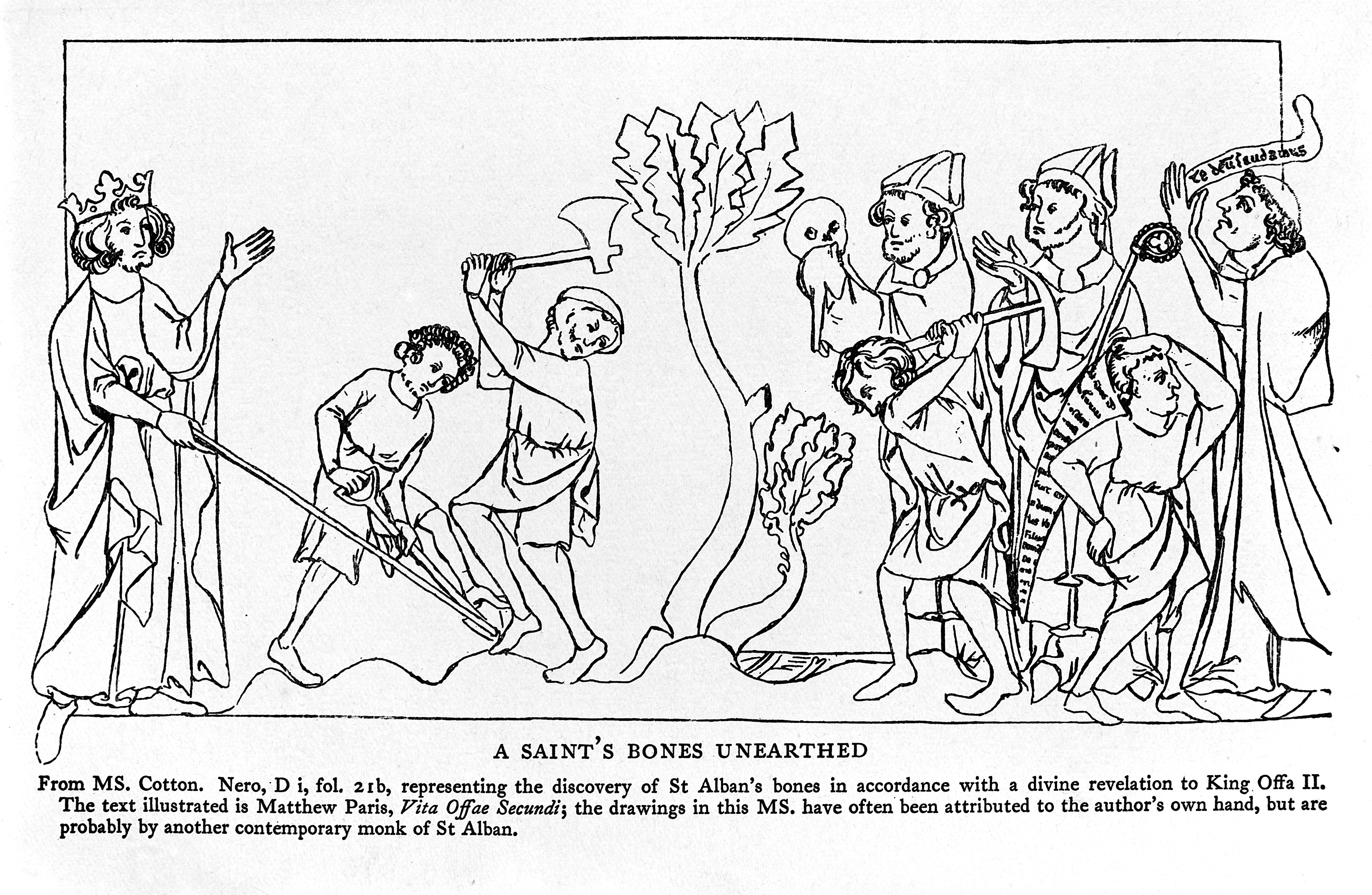
The discovery of St. Alban's bones, illustrated in The Life of St. Alban

Initially, Christianity was but one of a number of religions: in addition to the native and syncretic local forms of paganism, Roman legionaries and immigrants introduced other cults such as Mithraism. At various times, the Christians risked persecution, although the earliest known Christian martyrs in Britain – Saint Alban and "Amphibalus" – probably lived in the early 4th century. (Note: The date of Alban's execution has been a subject of discussion among historians with John Morris proposing that it took place during the persecutions of Emperor Septimius Severus as early as 209. The Anglo-Saxon Chronicle lists the year 283, and Bede places it in 305. Still others argue that sometime during the persecutors Decius or Valerian (251–259) is more likely.) Julius and Aaron, citizens of Caerleon, were said to have been martyred during the Diocletianic Persecution, although there is no textual or archaeological evidence to support the folk etymology of Lichfield as deriving from another thousand martyrs during the same years.

Christianization intensified with the legalisation of the Christian religion under Constantine the Great in the early 4th century and its promotion by subsequent Christian emperors. Three Romano-British bishops, including Archbishop Restitutus of London, are known to have been present at the Synod of Arles in 314. Others attended the Council of Serdica in 347 and the Council of Ariminum in 360. A number of references to the church in Roman Britain are also found in the writings of 4th-century Christian fathers. Britain was the home of Pelagius, who opposed Augustine of Hippo's doctrine of original sin; St Germanus was said to have visited the island in part to oppose the bishops who advocated his heresy.

Around 367, the Great Conspiracy saw the troops along Hadrian's Wall mutiny, allowing the Picts to overrun the northern areas of Roman Britain (in some cases joining in), in concert with Irish and Saxon attacks on the coast. The Roman provinces seem to have been retaken by Theodosius the Elder the next year, but many Romano-Britons had already been killed or taken as slaves. In 407, Constantine III declared himself "emperor of the West" and withdrew his legions to Gaul. The Byzantine historian Zosimus (c. 500) stated that Constantine's neglect of the area's defence against Irish and Saxon raids and invasions caused the Britons and Gauls to fully revolt from the Roman Empire, rejecting Roman law and reverting to their native customs. In any case, Roman authority was greatly weakened following the Visigoths' sack of Rome in 410. Medieval legend attributed widespread Saxon immigration to mercenaries hired by the British king Vortigern. The Saxon communities followed a form of Germanic paganism, driving Christian Britons back to Wales, Cornwall, and Brittany or subjugating them under kingdoms with no formal church presence.

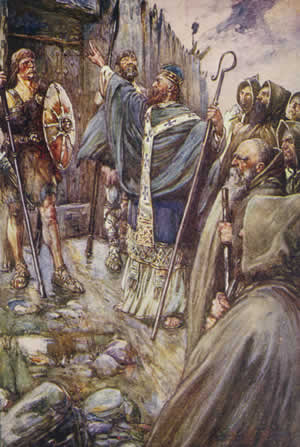
Columba at the gate of Bridei I's fortress, book illustration by Joseph Ratcliffe Skelton (1906)

Fifth and sixth century Britain, although poorly attested, saw the Age of Saints among the Welsh. Saint Dubric, Saint Illtud, and others first completed the Christianization of Wales. Saint Dubricius (also known as Dyfrig), who had been bishop at the Roman British settlement of Ariconium (in present-day Herefordshire) in the mid-fifth century, founded a monastery at nearby Hentland. He ordained Samson of Dol, who went on to evangelize Brittany.

Unwilling or unable to missionize among the Saxons in England, Briton refugees and missionaries such as Saint Patrick (Note: Note, however, that many events of Patrick's hagiographies may have originally intended the earlier Saint Palladius, a Gaul dispatched to Ireland by Pope Celestine I.) and Finnian of Clonard were then responsible for the Christianization of Ireland and made up the Seven Founder Saints of Brittany. The Irish in turn made Christians of the Picts and English. Saint Columba then began the conversion of the Dál Riata and the other peoples of Scotland, although native saints such as Mungo also arose. The history of Christianity in Cornwall is more obscure, but the native church seems to have been greatly strengthened by Welsh and Irish missionaries such as Saints Petroc, Piran, and Breaca. Extreme weather (as around 535) and the attendant famines and disease, particularly the arrival of the Plague of Justinian in Wales around 547 and Ireland around 548, may have contributed to these missionary efforts.

There is also evidence for the continuation of Christianity in south and east Britain after the Anglo-Saxon settlement, for example with an active shrine to Saint Alban. There are references in Anglo-Saxon poetry, including Beowulf, that show some interaction between pagan and Christian practices and values. While there is little scholarly focus on this subject, there is enough evidence from Gildas and elsewhere that it is safe to assume some continuing – perhaps more free – form of Christianity survived. Richard Whinder states "(The Church's pre-Augustine) characteristics place it in continuity with the rest of the Christian Church in Europe at that time and, indeed, in continuity with the Catholic faith ... today."

The title of "saint" was used quite broadly by British, Irish, and English Christians. Extreme cases are Irish accounts of Gerald of Mayo's presiding over 3,300 saints and Welsh claims that Bardsey Island held the remains of 20,000. (Note: The Bollandists compiling the Acta Sanctorum were even driven to complain of the Irish "canonising dead men in troops whenever they seemed to be somewhat better than usual".) More often, the title was given to the founder of any ecclesiastical settlement, which would thenceforth be known as their llan. Such communities were organized on tribal models: founding saints were almost invariably lesser members of local dynasties, they were not infrequently married, and their successors were often chosen from among their kin. In the 6th century, the "Three Saintly Families of Wales" – those of the invading Irish Brychan and Hen Ogledd's Cunedda Wledig and Caw of Strathclyde – displaced many of the local Silurian rulers in favor of their own families and clans. By some estimates, these traditions produced over 800 pre-congregational saints that were venerated locally in Wales, but invasions by Saxons, Irishmen, Vikings, Normans, and others destroyed many ecclesiastical records. Similarly, the distance from Rome, hostility to native practices and cults, and relative unimportance of the local sees has left only two local Welsh saints in the General Roman Calendar: Saints David and Winifred.

Insular Christianity developed distinct traditions and practices, most pointedly concerning the computus of Easter, as it produced the most obvious signs of disunity: the old and new methods did not usually agree, causing Christians following one system to begin celebrating the feast of the Resurrection while others continued to solemnly observe Lent. (Note: Indeed, this is noted as occurring in the household of King Oswiu of Northumbria, whose kingdom had been evangelised by both Irish and Roman missionaries.) Monasticism spread widely; the Llandaff Charters record over fifty religious foundations in southeast Wales alone. Although the clasau were rather modest affairs, great monasteries and monastic schools also developed at Llantwit Major (Llanilltud Fawr), Bangor, and Iona. The tonsure differed from that elsewhere and also became a point of contention. A distinction that became increasingly important was the nature of church organisation: some monasteries were led by married clergy, inheritance of religious offices was common (in Wales, as late as the 12th century), and illegitimacy was treated much more leniently with fathers simply needing to acknowledge the child for him to inherit an equal share with his brothers. Prior to their conquest by England, most churches have records of bishops and priests but not an established parish system. Pre-conquest, most Christians would not attend regular services but relied on members of the monastic communities who would occasionally make preaching tours through the area.

==== Wales ====
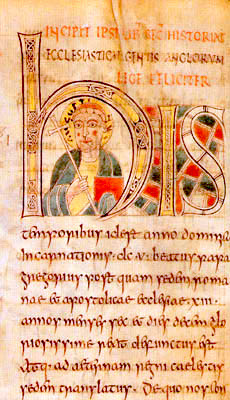
A portrait of Augustine of Canterbury from an 8th-century manuscript of Bede's Historia ecclesiastica gentis Anglorum

Christianity had entered Wales during Roman times, initially as an urban religion. At first it was banned by the authorities who were suspicious of its secrecy. The first Christian martyrs, in the fourth century in Wales were executed at the legionnaires' town of Caerleon (near present-day Newport in South Wales).

Bardsey Island has been an important religious site since the 6th century, when Saint Cadfan founded a monastery there. In medieval times it was a major centre of pilgrimage.

The saints seem often to have emerged from native tribal traditions. They were frequently from community nobility, but inspired by the Desert Fathers, they renounced the privileges of such positions to live remote, secluded, monastic lives. Their identity would emerge separately from the base established in England by Augustine of Canterbury in 597 AD. Although little else is known about these people, their influence persists in place names all over Wales, pre-fixed by the word Llan: an old Welsh word referring to land consecrated for burials and churches.

At the end of the 6th century, Pope Gregory I dispatched a mission under Augustine of Canterbury to convert the Anglo-Saxons, establish new sees and churches throughout their territories, and reassert papal authority over the native church. Gregory intended for Augustine to become the metropolitan bishop over all of southern Britain, including the existing dioceses under Welsh and Cornish control. Augustine met with British bishops in a series of conferences – known as the Synod of Chester – that attempted to assert his authority and to compel them to abandon aspects of their service that had fallen out of line with Roman practice. The Northumbrian cleric Bede's Ecclesiastical History of the English People is the only surviving account of these meetings: according to it, some of the clerics of the nearest British province met Augustine at a site that was known thereafter as Augustine's Oak. Augustine focused on seeking assistance for his work among the Saxons and reforming the Britons' obsolete method for calculating Easter; the clerics responded that they would need to confer with their people and await a larger assembly. Bede relates that the bishops particularly consulted a hermit on how to respond. He told them to respond based on Augustine's conduct: were he to rise to greet them, they would know him for a humble servant of Christ and should submit to his authority but, were he to remain seated, they would know him to be arrogant and prideful and should reject him. As it happened, Augustine did keep his seat, provoking mistrust. In the negotiations that followed, he offered to allow the Britons to maintain all their native customs but three: they should adopt Rome's more advanced method of calculating the date of Easter, reform their baptismal ritual, and join the missionary efforts among the Saxons. The British clerics rejected all of these, as well as Augustine's authority over them. John Edward Lloyd argues that the primary reason for the British bishops' rejection of Augustine – and especially his call for them to join his missionary effort – was his claim to sovereignty over them, given that his see would be so deeply entwined with the Anglo-Saxon Kingdom of Kent.

The death of hundreds of British clerics to the pagan king Æthelfrith of the Kingdom of Northumbria around 616 at the Battle of Chester was taken by Bede as fulfillment of the prophecy made by Augustine of Canterbury following the Synod of Chester. The prophecy stated that the British church would receive war and death from the Saxons if they refused to proselytise. (Note: Bede says 1,200 British clergy died; the Anglo-Saxon Chronicle says 200. Bede is unclear on the date of the battle, but the current view is that it occurred in 616.) Despite the inaccuracies of their system, the Britons did not adopt the Roman and Saxon computus until induced to do so around 768 by "Archbishop" Elfodd of "Gwynedd". The Norman invasion of Wales finally brought Welsh dioceses under England's control. The development of legends about the mission of Fagan and Deruvian and Philip the Apostle's dispatch of Joseph of Arimathea in part aimed to preserve the priority and authority of the native establishments at St David's, Llandaff, and Glastonbury. It was not until the death of Bishop Bernard (c. 1147) that St Davids finally abandoned its claims to metropolitan status and submitted to the Province of Canterbury, by which point the popularity of Geoffrey of Monmouth's pseudohistorical Historia Regum Britanniae had begun spreading these inventions further afield. Such ideas were used by mediaeval anti-Roman movements such as the Lollards and followers of John Wycliffe, as well as by English Catholics during the English Reformation. The legend that Jesus himself visited Britain is referred to in William Blake's 1804 poem "And did those feet in ancient time". The words of Blake's poem were set to music in 1916 by Hubert Parry as the well-known song "Jerusalem".

==== Scotland ====
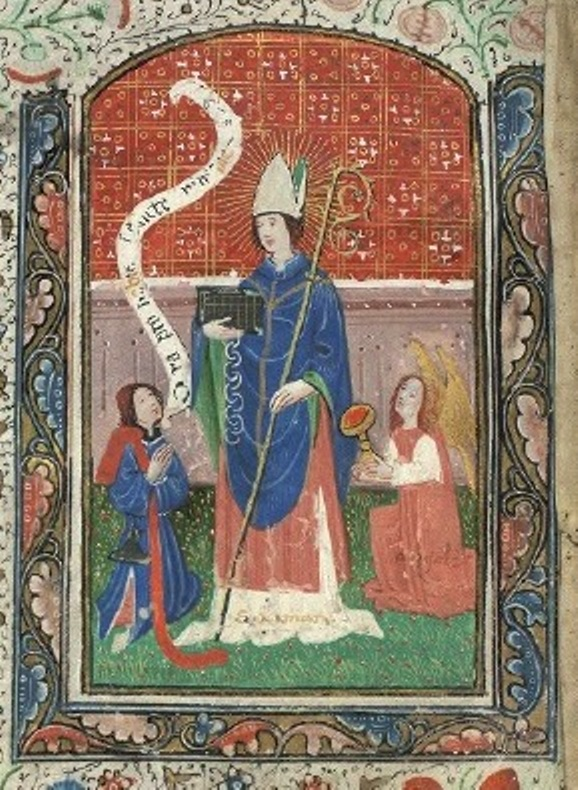
Saint Ninian as intercessor from Book of Hours of the Virgin and Saint Ninian (15th century)

According to Bede, Saint Ninian was born about 360 in what is present day Galloway, the son of a chief of the Novantae, apparently a Christian. He studied under Martin of Tours before returning to his own land about 397. He established himself at Whithorn where he built a church of stone, "Candida Casa". Tradition holds that Ninian established an episcopal see at the Candida Casa in Whithorn, and named the see for Saint Martin of Tours. He converted the southern Picts to Christianity, and died around 432. Many Irish saints trained at the "Candida Casa", such as Tigernach of Clones, Ciarán of Clonmacnoise, and Finnian of Movilla. Ninian's work was carried on by Palladius, who left Ireland to work among the Picts. The mission to the southern Picts apparently met with some setbacks, as Patrick charged Coroticus and the "apostate Picts" with conducting raids on the Irish coast and seizing Christians as slaves. Ternan and Saint Serf followed Palladius. Serf was the teacher of Saint Mungo, the apostle of Strathclyde, and patron saint of Glasgow.

==== Cornwall and West Devon ====
A Welshman of noble birth, Saint Petroc was educated in Ireland. He set out in a small boat with a few followers. In a type of peregrinatio, they let God determine their course. The winds and tides brought them to the Padstow estuary. Kevin of Glendalough was a student of Petroc. Saint Endelienta was the daughter of the Welsh king Brychan. She also travelled to Cornwall – that is ancient Dumnonia – to evangelize the locals as did St Nonna mother of St David who travelled on to Brittany. Her brother Nectan of Hartland worked in Devon. Saint Piran is the patron saint of tin miners. An Irishman, Ciaran, he is said to have 'floated' across to Cornwall after being thrown into the sea tied to a millstone. He has been identified on occasion with Ciarán of Saigir.

=== Ireland ===
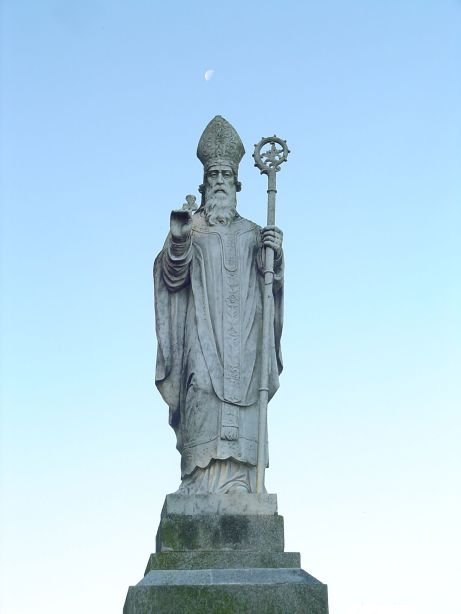
St. Patrick

By the early fifth century, the religion had spread to Ireland, which had never been part of the Roman Empire. There were Christians in Ireland before Palladius arrived in 431 as the first missionary bishop sent by Rome. His mission does not seem to have been entirely successful. The subsequent mission of Saint Patrick, traditionally starting in 432, established churches in conjunction with civitates like his own in Armagh; small enclosures in which groups of Christians, often of both sexes and including the married, lived together, served in various roles and ministered to the local population. Patrick set up diocesan structures with a hierarchy of bishops, priests, and deacons. During the late 5th and 6th centuries true monasteries became the most important centres: in Patrick's own see of Armagh the change seems to have happened before the end of the 5th century, thereafter the bishop was the abbot also. Within a few generations of the arrival of the first missionaries the monastic and clerical class of the isle had become fully integrated with the culture of Latin letters. Besides Latin, Irish ecclesiastics developed a written form of Old Irish. Others who influenced the development of Christianity in Ireland include Brigid (c. 451 – 525), Saint Moluag (c. 510 – 592, who evangelised in the area of present-day Scotland) and Saint Caillín (fl. c. 570).

== Universal practice ==
Connections with the greater Latin West brought the nations of Britain and Ireland into closer contact with the orthodoxy of the councils. The customs and traditions particular to Insular Christianity became a matter of dispute, especially the matter of the proper calculation of Easter. In addition to Easter dating, Irish scholars and cleric-scholars in continental Europe found themselves implicated in theological controversies but it is not always possible to distinguish when a controversy was based on matters of substance or on political grounds or xenophobic sentiments. Synods were held in Ireland, Gaul, and England (e.g. the Synod of Whitby) at which Irish and British religious rites were rejected but a degree of variation continued in Britain after the Ionan church accepted the Roman date.

The Easter question was settled at various times in different places. The following dates are derived from Haddan and Stubbs: southern Ireland, 626–628; northern Ireland, 692; Northumbria (converted by Irish missions), 664; East Devon and Somerset, the Britons under Wessex, 705; the Picts, 710; Iona, 716–718; Strathclyde, 721; North Wales, 768; South Wales, 777. Cornwall held out the longest of any, perhaps even, in parts, to the time of Bishop Aedwulf of Crediton (909).

A uniquely Irish penitential system was eventually adopted as a universal practice of the Church by the Fourth Lateran Council of 1215.

== Pan-Celtic traditions ==
Caitlin Corning identifies four customs that were common to both the Irish and British churches but not used elsewhere in the Christian world.

=== Easter calculation ===
Easter was originally dated according to Hebrew calendar, which tried to place Passover on the first full moon following the Spring equinox but did not always succeed. In his Life of Constantine, Eusebius records that the First Council of Nicaea (325) decided that all Christians should observe a common date for Easter separate from the Jewish calculations, according to the practice of the bishops of Rome and Alexandria. Calculating the proper date of Easter (computus) then became a complicated process involving a lunisolar calendar, finding the first Sunday after an idealized Passover on the first full moon after the equinox.

Various tables were drawn up, aiming to produce the necessary alignment between the solar year and the phases of the calendrical moon. The less exact 8-year cycle was replaced by (or by the time of) Augustalis's treatise "On the measurement of Easter", which includes an 84-year cycle based on Meton. This was introduced to Britain, whose clerics at some point modified it to use the Julian calendar's original equinox on 25 March instead of the Nicaean equinox, which had already drifted to 21 March. This calendar was conserved by the Britons and Irish while the Romans and French began to use the Victorian cycle of 532 years. The Romans (but not the French) then adopted the still-better work of Dionysius in 525, which brought them into harmony with the Church of Alexandria.

In the early 600s Christians in Ireland and Britain became aware of the divergence in dating between them and those in Europe. The first clash came in 602 when a synod of French bishops opposed the practices of the monasteries established by St Columbanus; Columbanus appealed to Pope Gregory I but received no answer and finally moved from their jurisdiction. It was a primary concern for St Augustine and his mission, although Oswald's flight to Dál Riata and eventual restoration to his throne meant that Celtic practice was introduced to Northumbria until the 664 synod in Whitby. The groups furthest away from the Gregorian mission were generally the readiest to acknowledge the superiority of the new tables: the bishops of southern Ireland adopted the continental system at the Synod of Mag Léne (c. 630); the c. 697 Council of Birr saw the northern Irish bishops follow suit. The abbey at Iona and its satellites held out until 716, while the Welsh did not adopt the Roman and Saxon computus until induced to do so around 768 by Elfodd, "archbishop" of Bangor.

=== Monastic tonsure ===
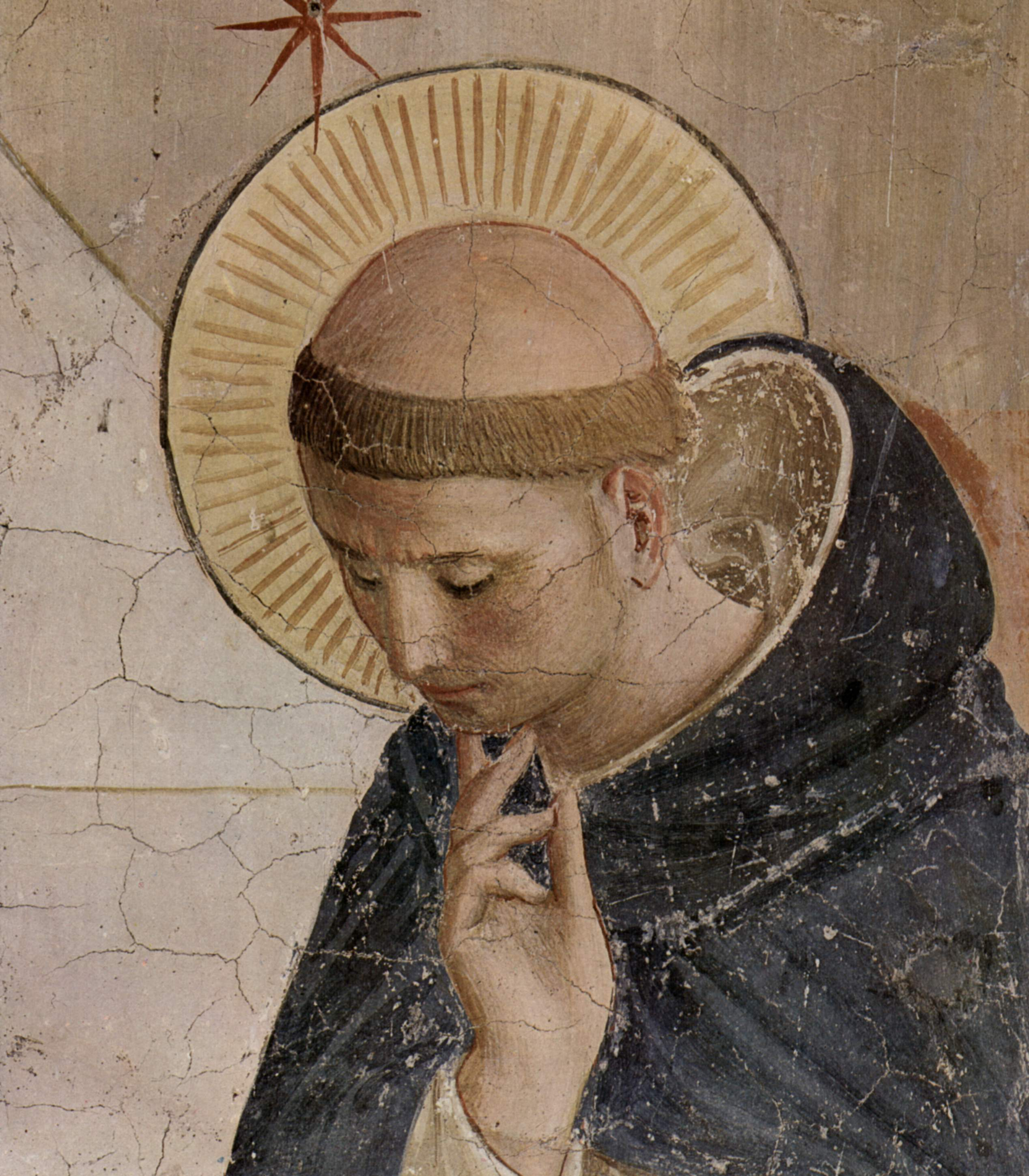
The Roman tonsure, in the shape of a crown, differing from the Irish tradition, which is unclear but involved shaving the hair from ear to ear in some fashion

All monks of the period, and apparently most or all clergy, kept a distinct tonsure, or method of cutting one's hair, to distinguish their social identity as men of the cloth. In Ireland men otherwise wore longish hair, and a shaved head was worn by slaves.

The prevailing Roman custom was to shave a circle at the top of the head, leaving a halo of hair or corona; this was eventually associated with the imagery of Christ's crown of thorns. The early material referring to the Celtic tonsure emphasizes its distinctiveness from the Roman alternative and invariably connects its use to the Celtic dating of Easter. Those preferring the Roman tonsure considered the Celtic custom extremely unorthodox, and associated it with the form of tonsure worn by the heresiarch Simon Magus. This association appears in a 672 letter from Saint Aldhelm to King Geraint of Dumnonia, but it may have been circulating since the Synod of Whitby. The tonsure is also mentioned in a passage, probably of the 7th century but attributed wrongly to Gildas: "Britones toti mundo contrarii, moribus Romanis inimici, non solum in missa sed in tonsura etiam" ("Britons are contrary to the whole world, enemies of Roman customs, not only in the Mass but also in regard to the tonsure").

The exact shape of the Irish tonsure is unclear from the early sources, although they agree that the hair was in some way shorn over the head from ear to ear. In 1639 James Ussher suggested a semi-circular shape, rounded in the front and culminating at a line between the ears. This suggestion was accepted by many subsequent writers, but in 1703 Jean Mabillon put forth a new hypothesis, claiming that the entire forehead was shaven back to the ears. Mabillon's version was widely accepted, but contradicts the early sources. In 2003 Daniel McCarthy suggested a triangular shape, with one side between the ears and a vertex towards the front of the head. The Collectio canonum Hibernensis cites the authority of Saint Patrick as indicating that the custom originated with the swineherd of Lóegaire mac Néill, the king who opposed Patrick.

=== Penitentials ===
In Christian Ireland – as well as Pictish and English peoples they Christianised – a distinctive form of penance developed, where confession was made privately to a priest, under the seal of secrecy, and where penance was given privately and ordinarily performed privately as well. Certain handbooks were made, called "penitentials", designed as a guide for confessors and as a means of regularising the penance given for each particular sin.

In antiquity, penance had been a public ritual. Penitents were divided into a separate part of the church during liturgical worship, and they came to Mass wearing sackcloth and ashes in a process known as exomologesis that often involved some form of general confession. There is evidence that this public penance was preceded by a private confession to a bishop or priest (sacerdos), and it seems that, for some sins, private penance was allowed instead. Nonetheless, penance and reconciliation was prevailingly a public rite (sometimes unrepeatable), which included absolution at its conclusion.

The Irish penitential practice spread throughout the continent, where the form of public penance had fallen into disuse. Saint Columbanus was credited with introducing the medicamenta paentitentiae, the "medicines of penance", to Gaul at a time when they had come to be neglected. Though the process met some resistance, by 1215 the practice had become established as the norm, with the Fourth Lateran Council establishing a canonical statute requiring confession at a minimum of once per year.

=== Peregrinatio ===
A final distinctive tradition common across Britain and Ireland was the popularity of peregrinatio pro Christo ("exile for Christ"). The term peregrinatio is Latin, and referred to the state of living or sojourning away from one's homeland in Roman law. It was later used by the Church Fathers, in particular Saint Augustine of Hippo, who wrote that Christians should live a life of peregrinatio in the present world while awaiting the Kingdom of God. Augustine's version of peregrinatio spread widely throughout the Christian church, but it took two additional unique meanings in Celtic countries.

In the first sense, the penitentials prescribed permanent or temporary peregrinatio as penance for certain infractions. Additionally, there was a tradition of undertaking a voluntary peregrinatio pro Christo, in which individuals permanently left their homes and put themselves entirely in God's hands. In the Irish tradition there were two types of such peregrinatio, the "lesser" peregrinatio, involving leaving one's home area but not the island, and the "superior" peregrinatio, which meant leaving Ireland for good. This voluntary exile to spend one's life in a foreign land far from friends and family came to be termed the "white martyrdom".

Most peregrini or exiles of this type were seeking personal spiritual fulfilment, but many became involved in missionary endeavours. The Briton Saint Patrick became the evangelist of Ireland during what he called his peregrinatio there, while Saint Samson left his home to ultimately become bishop in Brittany. The Irishmen Columba and Columbanus similarly founded highly important religious communities after leaving their homes. Irish-educated English Christians such as Gerald of Mayo, the Two Ewalds, Willehad, Willibrord, Wilfrid, Ceolfrith, and other English all followed these Irish traditions.

== Other British and Irish traditions ==
A number of other distinctive traditions and practices existed (or are taken to have existed) in Britain or Ireland, but are not known to have been in use across the entire region. Different writers and commenters have identified different traditions as representative of so-called Celtic Christianity.

=== Alleged Coptic (Alexandrian) influences ===
One tradition traces elements of Celtic Christianity in Ireland and in Gaul to the Coptic Church which developed in and around Alexandria in Egypt.

=== Monasticism ===
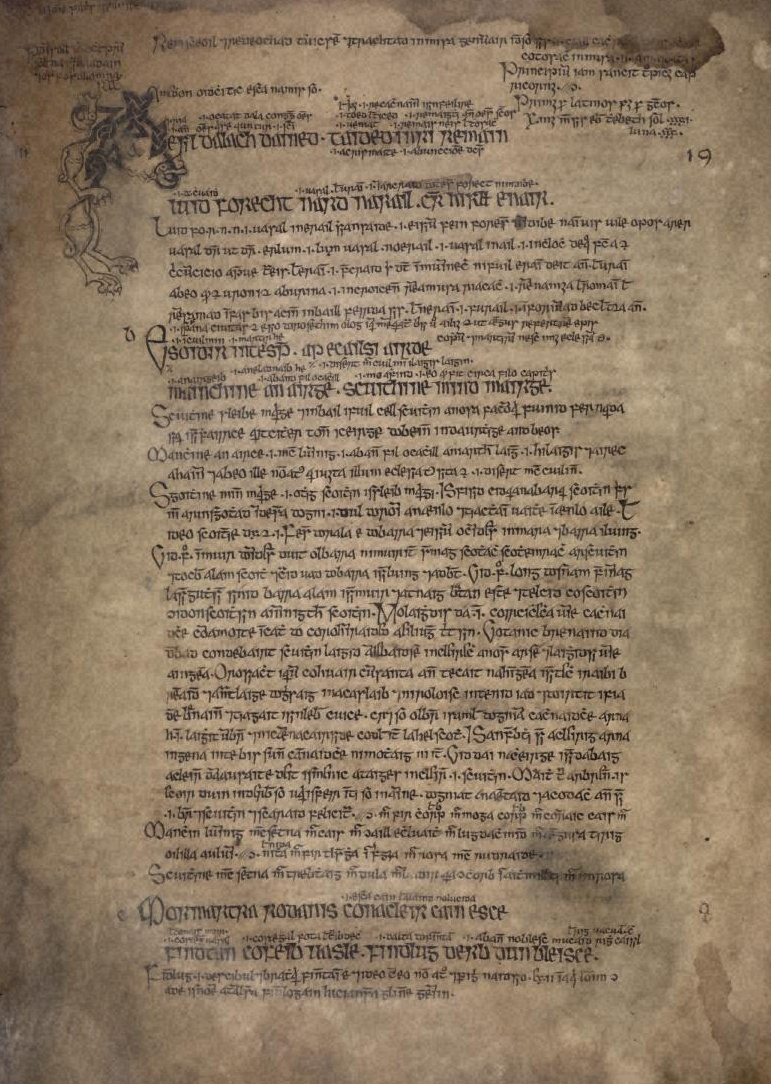
Excerpt from the Martyrology of Oengus

Monastic spirituality came to Britain and then Ireland from Gaul, by way of Lérins, Tours, and Auxerre. Its spirituality was heavily influenced by the Desert Fathers. According to Richard Woods, the familial, democratic, and decentralized aspects of Egyptian Christianity were better suited to structures and values of Celtic culture than was a legalistic diocesan form. Monasteries tended to be cenobitical in that monks lived in separate cells but came together for common prayer, meals, and other functions. Some more austere ascetics became hermits living in remote locations in what came to be called the "green martyrdom". An example of this would be Kevin of Glendalough and Cuthbert of Lindisfarne.

One controversial belief is that the true ecclesiastical power in the Celtic world lay in the hands of abbots of monasteries, rather than bishops of dioceses. While this may have been the case for centuries in most of Ireland, it was never the rule throughout the Celtic world at large. It is certain that the ideal of monasticism was universally esteemed in Celtic Christianity. This was especially true in Ireland and areas evangelised by Irish missionaries, where monasteries and their abbots came to be vested with a great deal of ecclesiastical and secular power. Following the growth of the monastic movement in the 6th century, abbots controlled not only individual monasteries, but also expansive estates and the secular communities that tended them. As monastics, abbots were not necessarily ordained (i.e. they were not necessarily priests or bishops). They were usually descended from one of the many Irish royal families, and the founding regulations of the abbey sometimes specified that the abbacy should if possible be kept within one family lineage.

This focus on the monastery has led some scholars, most notably Kathleen Hughes, to argue that the monastic system came to be the dominant ecclesiastical structure in the Irish church, essentially replacing the earlier episcopal structure of the type found in most of the rest of the Christian world. Hughes argued that the paruchia, or network of monasteries attached to an abbey, replaced the diocese as the chief administrative unit of the church, and the position of Abbot largely replaced that of bishop in authority and prominence. According to this model, bishops were still needed, since certain sacramental functions were reserved only for the ordained, but they had little authority in the ecclesiastical structure.

However, more recent scholarship, particularly the work of Donnchadh Ó Corráin and Richard Sharpe, has offered a more nuanced view of the interrelationships between the monastic system and the traditional Church structures. Sharpe argues that there is no evidence that the paruchia overrode the diocese, or that the abbot replaced the Bishop; Bishops still exercised ultimate spiritual authority and remained in charge of the diocesan clergy. But either way, the monastic ideal was regarded as the utmost expression of the Christian life.

The focus on powerful abbots and monasteries was limited to the Irish Church, however, and not in Britain. The British church employed an episcopal structure corresponding closely to the model used elsewhere in the Christian world.

Irish monasticism was notable for its permeability. In permeable monasticism, people were able to move freely in and out of the monastic system at different points of life. Young boys and girls would enter the system to pursue Latin scholarship. Students would sometimes travel from faraway lands to enter the Irish monasteries. When these students became adults, they would leave the monastery to live out their lives. Eventually, these people would retire back to secure community provided by the monastery and stay until their death. However, some would stay within the monastery and become leaders. Since most of the clergy were Irish, native traditions were well-respected. Permeable monasticism popularised the use of vernacular and helped mesh the norms of secular and monastic element in Ireland, unlike other parts of Europe where monasteries were more isolated. Examples of these intertwining motifs can be seen in the hagiographies of St. Brigid and St. Columba.

This willingness to learn, and also to teach, was a hallmark of the "permeable monasticism" that so characterised the Irish monastery. While a hermitage was still the highest form of dedication, the monasteries were very open to allowing students and children within the walls for an education, without requiring them to become monks. These students were then allowed to leave and live within the community, and were welcomed back in their old age to retire in peace. This style of monasticism allowed for the monastery to connect with, and become a part of, the community at large. The availability of the monks to the people was instrumental in converting Ireland from paganism to Christianity, allowing a blend of the two cultures.

==== Wales ====
According to hagiographies written some centuries later, Illtud and his pupils Saint David, Gildas, and Deiniol were leading figures in 6th-century Britain.

Not far from Llantwit Fawr stood Cadoc's foundation of Llancarfan, founded in the latter part of the fifth century. The son of Gwynllyw, a prince of South Wales, who before his death renounced the world to lead an eremitical life, Cadoc followed his father's example and received the religious habit from St. Tathai, an Irish monk, superior of a small community at Swent near Chepstow, in Monmouthshire. Returning to his native county, Cadoc built a church and monastery, which was called Llancarfan, or the "Church of the Stags". Here he established a monastery, college and hospital. The spot at first seemed an impossible one, and an almost inaccessible marsh, but he and his monks drained and cultivated it, transforming it into one of the most famous religious houses in South Wales. His legend recounts that he daily fed a hundred clergy and a hundred soldiers, a hundred workmen, a hundred poor men, and the same number of widows. When thousands left the world and became monks, they very often did so as clansmen, dutifully following the example of their chief. Bishoprics, canonries, and parochial benefices passed from one to another member of the same family, and frequently from father to son. Their tribal character is a feature which Irish and Welsh monasteries had in common.

Illtud, said to have been an Armorican by descent, spent the first period of his religious life as a disciple of St. Cadoc at Llancarvan. He founded the monastery at Llantwit Major. The monastery stressed learning as well as devotion. One of his fellow students was Paul Aurelian, a key figure in Cornish monasticism. Gildas the Wise was invited by Cadoc to deliver lectures in the monastery and spent a year there, during which he made a copy of a book of the Gospels, long treasured in the church of St. Cadoc. One of the most notable pupils of Illtyd was St. Samson of Dol, who lived for a time the life of a hermit in a cave near the river Severn before founding a monastery in Brittany.

St David established his monastery on a promontory on the western sea. It was well placed to be a centre of Insular Christianity. When Alfred the Great sought a scholar for his court, he summoned Asser of Saint David's. Contemporary with David were Saint Teilo, Cadoc, Padarn, Beuno and Tysilio among them. It was from Illtud and his successors that the Irish sought guidance on matters of ritual and discipline. Finnian of Clonard studied under Cadoc at Llancarfan in Glamorgan.

==== Ireland ====
Finnian of Clonard is said to have trained the Twelve Apostles of Ireland at Clonard Abbey.

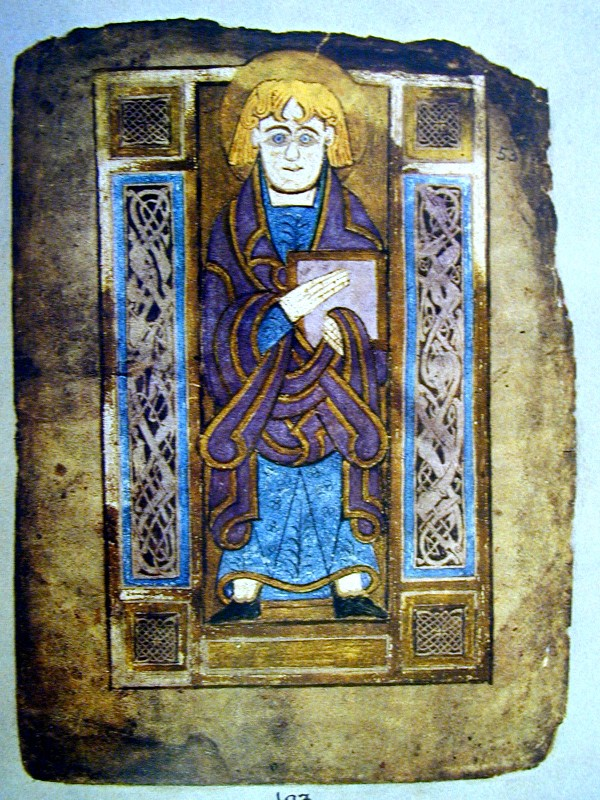
Saint John, evangelist portrait from the Book of Mulling, Irish, late 8th century

The achievements of insular art, in illuminated manuscripts like the Book of Kells, high crosses, and metalwork like the Ardagh Chalice remain very well known, and in the case of manuscript decoration had a profound influence on Western medieval art. The manuscripts were certainly produced by and for monasteries, and the evidence suggests that metalwork was produced in both monastic and royal workshops, perhaps as well as secular commercial ones.

In the 6th and 7th centuries, Irish monks established monastic institutions in parts of modern-day Scotland (especially Columba, also known as Colmcille or, in Old Irish, Colum Cille), and on the continent, particularly in Gaul (especially Columbanus). Monks from Iona Abbey under St. Aidan founded the See of Lindisfarne in Anglo-Saxon Northumbria in 635, whence Gaelic-Irish practice heavily influenced northern England.

Irish monks also founded monasteries across the continent, exerting influence greater than many more ancient continental centres. The first issuance of a papal privilege granting a monastery freedom from episcopal oversight was that of Pope Honorius I to Bobbio Abbey, one of Columbanus's institutions.

At least in Ireland, the monastic system became increasingly secularised from the 8th century, as close ties between ruling families and monasteries became apparent. The major monasteries were now wealthy in land and had political importance. On occasion they made war either upon each other or took part in secular wars – a battle in 764 is supposed to have killed 200 from Durrow Abbey when they were defeated by Clonmacnoise. From early periods the kin nature of many monasteries had meant that some married men were part of the community, supplying labour and with some rights, including in the election of abbots (but obliged to abstain from sex during fasting periods). Some abbacies passed from father to son, and then even grandsons. A revival of the ascetic tradition came in the second half of the century, with the culdee or "clients (vassals) of God" movement founding new monasteries detached from family groupings.

=== Rule of Columbanus ===
The monasteries of the Irish missions, and many at home, adopted the Rule of Saint Columbanus, which was stricter than the Rule of Saint Benedict, the main alternative in the West. In particular there was more fasting and an emphasis on corporal punishment. For some generations monks trained by Irish missionaries continued to use the Rule and to found new monasteries using it, but most converted to the Benedictine Rule over the 8th and 9th centuries. (Note: The main source for Columbanus's life or vita is recorded by Jonas of Bobbio, an Italian monk who entered the monastery in Bobbio in 618, three years after the Saint's death; Jonas wrote the life c. 643. This author lived during the abbacy of Attala, Columbanus's immediate successor, and his informants had been companions of the saint. Mabillon in the second volume of his "Acta Sanctorum O.S.B." gives the life in full, together with an appendix on the miracles of the saint, written by an anonymous member of the Bobbio community.)

=== Baptism ===
Bede implies that in the time of Augustine of Canterbury, British churches used a baptismal rite that was in some way at variance with the Roman practice. According to Bede, the British Christians' failure to "complete" the sacrament of baptism was one of the three specific issues with British practice that Augustine could not overlook. There is no indication as to how the baptism was "incomplete" according to the Roman custom. It may be that there was some difference in the confirmation rite, or that there was no confirmation at all. At any rate, it is unlikely to have caused as much discord as the Easter controversy or the tonsure, as no other source mentions it. As such there is no evidence that heterodox baptism figured in the practice of the Irish church. The Celtic Christians may have used triple immersion in Baptism, and may have been slow to adopt infant baptism.

=== Accusations of Judaizing ===
A recurrent accusation levelled against the Irish throughout the Middle Ages is that they were Judaizers – that they observed certain religious rites after the manner of the Jews. The belief that Irish Christians were Judaizers can be observed in three main areas: the Easter Controversy, the notion that the Irish practised obsolete laws from the Old Testament and (not unrelated to this) the view that they adhered too closely to the Old Testament. Quite apart from the intricate theological concerns that underpinned the debate over Easter in early 7th-century Gaul, Columbanus also found himself accused of Quartodecimanism, a heresy whose central tenet was observing Easter on the same date as the eve of the Jewish Passover, namely the fourteenth day of the Jewish lunar month of Nisan. Although this accusation was raised at a time of heightened political tensions between Columbanus and the Gallic bishops, some historians have cautioned that it ought not be dismissed as a mere ruse because the Gauls may have been genuinely worried about blurring the boundaries between Gallic Christians and their Jewish neighbours. That the Irish practised obsolete Old Testament laws is another accusation that repeats itself a number of times in the early Middle Ages, most famously in the case of the 8th-century Irish charismatic preacher, Clement Scotus I (fl. 745), who was condemned as a heretic, in part for urging followers to follow Old Testament law in such controversial matters as obliging a man to marry his widowed sister-in-law upon his brother's death. One example for the Irish tendency to adhere closely to the Old Testament is the Collectio canonum Hibernensis, a late 7th- or early 8th-century Irish canon law collection which was the first text of church law to draw heavily on the Bible, and in particular the Old Testament. In Scotland similar accusations surround the supposed cultural taboo concerning pork. The Celtic Church is also thought to have observed the seventh day as the Sabbath.

== Influence on Christianity in the British Isles ==
According to John Bowden, "the singing of metrical psalms, many of them set to old Celtic Christianity Scottish traditional and folk tunes" is a feature that remains a "distinctive part of Scottish Presbyterian worship".

== Celtic Christian revivalism ==
Ian Bradley notes that the recurrent interest in medieval insular Christianity has led to successive revival movements he terms "Celtic Christian revivalism". He notes the establishment of the Celtic Orthodox Church, which maintains a relationship with the Syriac Orthodox Church, as an effort to maintain the "distinctive tenets of Celtic Christianity" in an autocephalous Christian denomination.

According to Bradley, most, though not all, revivalists are non-Celts for whom Celtic Christianity has an "exotic and peripheral" appeal. Adherents typically claim their revivals restore authentic practices and traits, though Bradley notes they reflect contemporary concerns and prejudices much more closely, and most are "at least partially inspired and driven by denominational and national rivalries, ecclesiastical and secular power politics, and an anti-Roman Catholic agenda." Though often inaccurate or distorted, the beliefs of these movements have greatly influenced popular conceptions of historical Celtic Christianity.

Bradley traces the origins of Celtic Christian revivalism to the Middle Ages. In the 8th and 9th century, authors wrote idealised hagiographies of earlier saints, whose "golden age" of extraordinary holiness contrasted with the perceived corruption of later times. Similarly, the 12th- and 13th-century literary revival popularised and romanticised older Celtic traditions such as the Arthurian legend. These ideas were expanded during the English Reformation, as Protestant authors appropriated the concept of a "Celtic Church" as a native, anti-Roman predecessor to their own movement. Nevertheless, despite his scholarly deconstruction of much of the popular view of "Celtic Christianity", in work such as his Celtic Christian Communities: Live The Tradition Bradley argues that historically well-founded insights can be applied to re-imagine life and ministry in contemporary churches.

In the 18th and 19th centuries, antiquarianism, the Romantic movement, and growing nationalism influenced ideas about what was becoming known as "Celtic Christianity". Beginning in the early 20th century, a full-fledged revival movement began, centred on the island of Iona and influenced by the Irish Literary Revival and more general Christian revivals. By the end of the 20th century, another wave of enthusiasm began, this time influenced by New Age ideals. Today, a self-identification with and use of "Celtic Christianity" is common in countries such as Ireland, both among participants in established churches and independent groups.

== See also ==
- Ancient Celtic religion
- Book of Llandaff
- Christianity in England
- Christianity in Roman Britain
- Christianity in Scotland
- Christianity in Wales
- Germanic Christianity
- History of Ireland (400–800)
- History of Christianity in Ireland
- Papar

== Bibliography ==
=== Primary sources ===
- Adomnan (1991). Anderson, A.O.; Anderson, M.O. (eds.). Life of Columba (2nd ed.). Oxford Medieval Texts.
- Williams, John, ed. (1860). Annales Cambriae. London: Longman, Green, Longman and Roberts – via Internet Archive.
- Bede (1896). Plummer, Charles (ed.). Historia Ecclesiastica Gentis Angelorum. Venerabilis Baedae Opera Historica. Oxonii: E Typographeo Clarendoniano – via Internet Archive.
- Bede (1999). Ecclesiastical History of the English People. Oxford University Press.
- Cummian (1988). Walsh, Maura; Ó Cróinín, Dáibhí (eds.). De controversia paschali and De ratione conputandi. Toronto: Pontifical Institute of Mediaeval Studies. pp. 93–5.
- Gildas (1848). Giles, J.A. (ed.). De Excidio Britanniae. Six Old English Chronicles. London.
- Giles, J.A., ed. (1848). Historia Brittonum. Six Old English Chronicles. London.
- McNeill, John T.; Gamer, Helena M., eds. (1938). Medieval Handbooks of Penance. New York: Columbia University Press.
- Patrick (Saint) (1998). Skinner, John (ed.). Confessio. Translated by John Skinner. Image.
- Baring-Gould, Sabine (1907). The Lives of the British Saints. Scanned by Google; alphabetized.

=== Secondary sources ===
- Baring-Gould, Sabine (1898). "The Celtic Church and its Saints". The Lives of the Saints. Vol. 16. New York: Longmans, Green, & Co.
- Bradley, Ian (1999). Celtic Christianity: Making Myths and Chasing Dreams. Edinburgh University Press. ISBN 0-7486-1047-2.
- Brown, Peter (2003). The Rise of Western Christendom: Triumph and Diversity (2nd ed.). Oxford: Blackwell Publishing.
- Charles-Edwards, T.M. (2000). Early Christian Ireland. Cambridge.
- Corning, Caitlin (2006). The Celtic and Roman Traditions: Conflict and Consensus in the Early Medieval Church. Palgrave Macmillan. ISBN 1-4039-7299-0.
- Ó Cróinín, Dáibhí (1995). Early Medieval Ireland: 400–1200. London.
- Davies, Wendy (1992). "The Myth of the Celtic Church". In Edwards, Nancy; Lane, Alan (eds.). The Early Church in Wales and the West. Oxbow Monograph. Vol. 16. Oxford: Oxbow. pp. 12–21.
- Flechner, Roy; Meeder, Sven, eds. (2016). The Irish in Early Medieval Europe: Identity, Culture and Religion. London: Palgrave Macmillan. ISBN 9781137430595.
- Herren, Michael W.; Brown, Shirley Ann (2002). Christ in Celtic Christianity. Woodbridge: Boydell Press. ISBN 0-85115-889-7.
- Hughes, Kathleen (1981). "The Celtic Church: Is This a Valid Concept? O'Donnell lectures in Celtic Studies, University of Oxford 1975". Cambridge Medieval Celtic Studies. 1: 1–20.
- Hughes, Kathleen (1966). The Church in Early Irish Society. London: Methuen. ISBN 1-59740-067-X. OCLC 711797907.
- Hughes, Kathleen (2005). "The Church in Early Irish Society: 400–800". In Ó Cróinín, Dáibhí (ed.). A New History of Ireland: Prehistoric and Early Ireland. Oxford University Press. ISBN 978-0-19-922665-8. Google Books link 2
- John, Eric (2000). "The Social and Political Problems of the Early English Church". In Pelteret, David A. E. (ed.). Anglo-Saxon History: Basic Readings. New York: Garland Publishing.
- Koch, John T. (2006). Celtic Culture: A Historical Encyclopedia. ABC-CLIO.
- Lloyd, John Edward (1912). A History of Wales from the Earliest Times to the Edwardian Conquest. Longmans, Green, and Co.
- Newell, J. Philip (2000). Celtic Benediction: Morning and Night Prayer. Grand Rapids, MI: Eerdmans.
- McCarthy, Daniel (2003). "On the Shape of the Insular Tonsure" (PDF). Celtica. 24: 140–167.
- Meeder, Sven (2011). "Boniface and the Irish Heresy of Clemens". Church History. 80 (2): 251–80. doi:10.1017/s0009640711000035. S2CID 163075473.
- Nordenfalk, Carl (1977). Celtic and Anglo-Saxon Painting: Book illumination in the British Isles 600–800. New York: George Braziller.
- Pächt, Otto (1986). Book Illumination in the Middle Ages. London: Harvey Miller Publishers. ISBN 0-19-921060-8. (trans fr German)
- Ryan, John (1931). Irish Monasticism, Origins and Early Development. Dublin: Talbot Press.
- Sharpe, Richard (1984). "Some problems concerning the organisation of the Church in early medieval Ireland". Peritia. 3: 230–70. doi:10.1484/j.peri.3.68.
- Stancliffe, Clare (1992). "Columbanus and the Gallic Bishops". In Constable, G.; Rouche, M. (eds.). Mélanges offerts au Professeur Oliver Guillot. Paris. pp. 205–14.
- Wormald, Patrick (2006). "Bede and the 'Church of the English'". In Baxter, Stephen (ed.). The Times of Bede: Studies in Early English Christian Society and its Historian. Oxford: Blackwell Publishing.
- Yorke, Barbara (2006). The Conversion of Britain: Religion, Politics and Society in Britain c. 600–800. London: Pearson/Longman. ISBN 0-582-77292-3.
- Youngs, Susan, ed. (1989). 'The Work of Angels', Masterpieces of Celtic Metalwork, 6th–9th centuries AD. London: British Museum Press. ISBN 0-7141-0554-6.
