= Clement Scotus =

Clement Scotus may refer to:

- Clement of Ireland or Clement Scotus (ca. 750 – 818), venerated as a saint by the Catholic Church
- Clement Scotus I (fl. 745), bishop
- Clement Scotus II, grammarian
