= Elizabeth Rowe =

Elizabeth Rowe may refer to:

- Elizabeth Singer Rowe (1674–1737), English poet, essayist, and fiction writer
- Elizabeth George (businesswoman) (née Rowe; c.1814–1902), hotel owner, businesswoman, and community leader in New Zealand
- Elizabeth Ashman Rowe, American historian and author
- Elizabeth Rowe (flutist) (born 1974), American flutist
- Elizabeth Ulman Rowe, leader in urban planning
