= Department of Anglo-Saxon, Norse and Celtic, University of Cambridge =

Department of the University of Cambridge, England

Department of Anglo-Saxon, Norse and Celtic
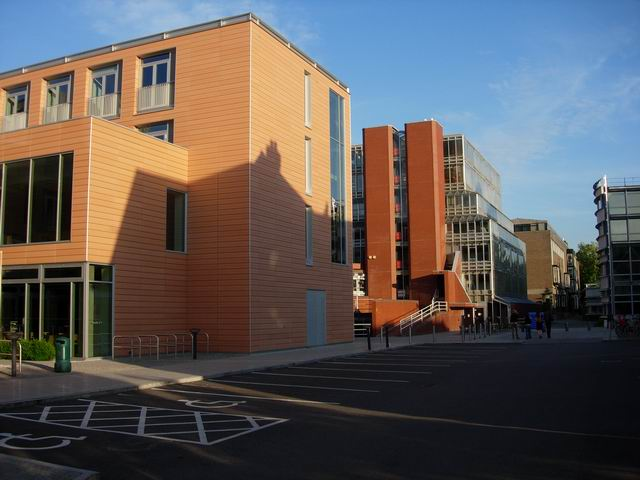
- Partial view of 9 West Road, the Cambridge English Faculty Building, housing the ASNC department
- Established: 1928
- Location: Faculty of English at 9 West Road, Cambridge, United Kingdom
- Website: www.asnc.cam.ac.uk

The Department of Anglo-Saxon, Norse and Celtic (ASNC or, informally, ASNaC) is one of the constituent departments of the University of Cambridge, and focuses on the history, material culture, languages and literatures of the various peoples who inhabited Britain, Ireland and the extended Scandinavian world in the early Middle Ages (5th century to 12th century). It is based on the second floor of the Faculty of English at 9 West Road on the Sidgwick Site. In Cambridge University jargon, its students are called ASNaCs.

As of 2011, it was the only university faculty or department in the world to focus entirely on the early Middle Ages.

== Name ==
The name Anglo-Saxon, Norse and Celtic dates to 1971, when the Department of Anglo-Saxon and Kindred Studies was renamed.

The acronym ASNC or ASNaC is pronounced /ˈæznæk/, and originally denoted members of the ASNC Society rather than of the Department. It was coined as a pun on an early poster for the ASNC Society Lunches: 'A Snack for ASNACs'. Students in the department were referred to in English as Asnackers, in French as Asnaciennes or Asnaques, and in German as Asnäckische. Later the simpler term Asnacs came into common use.

== History ==
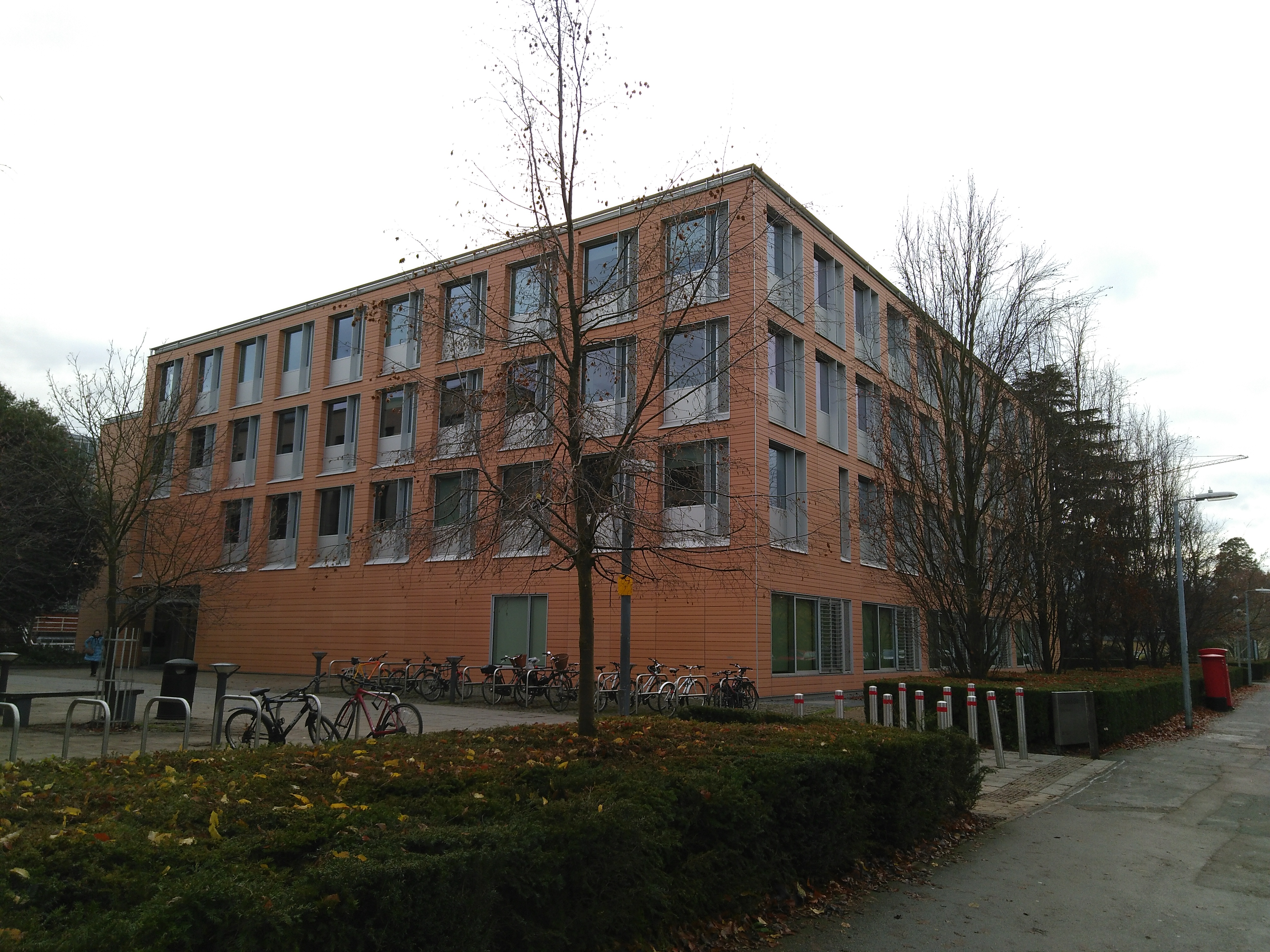
English Faculty building on the Sidgwick Site, current home of the ASNaC Department

The study of Anglo-Saxon England and its neighbouring regions has deep roots at Cambridge, beginning with the sixteenth-century Archbishop Matthew Parker. The first half of the seventeenth century saw Abraham Wheelocke hold a readership in Anglo-Saxon, and in 1657 John Spelman bestowed on William Somner the annual stipend of the Anglo-Saxon lecture founded by his father, Sir Henry Spelman, at Cambridge, enabling him to complete the first Old English dictionary. After a lull in interest in Old English, in the nineteenth century, John Mitchell Kemble developed the study of Old English and Anglo-Saxon archaeology at Trinity College, and Joseph Bosworth, another Anglo-Saxonist who was associated with Trinity, endowed the Elrington and Bosworth Chair in Anglo-Saxon, established in 1878, and first held by Walter William Skeat.

Strengths at Cambridge in Old Norse were built up by Eiríkur Magnússon (1833–1913) and in Celtic studies by Edmund Crosby Quiggin (1875–1920).

The ASNaC Department as such has its origins in the work and ideas of Skeat's successor as Elrington and Bosworth Professor, Hector Munro Chadwick, of Clare College. Chadwick took a leading role in integrating the philological study of Old English with archaeology and history and, by bringing the study of Old English from the Faculty of English to Archaeology and Anthropology in 1928, founded what was to become the Department of Anglo-Saxon, Norse and Celtic: "Chadwick's aim ... was to keep Old English studies free from philology (as it was then practised), but also from the dominance of English Literature". However, "the alliance of Anglo-Saxon and archaeology suited the professor and not the students; and in the 1960s Professor Dorothy Whitelock led the Saxon flock back into the English fold"—specifically in 1967, though the Department of Archaeology and Anthropology continues to sustain strengths in Anglo-Saxon and early medieval archaeology, with relevant archaeology papers being available to ASNaCs. The Anglo-Saxon and Kindred Studies Tripos was introduced as a single-part (two-year) Tripos in 1957, the class list being published under the title 'Anglo-Saxon'; in 1971 this was relabelled 'Anglo-Saxon, Norse and Celtic' under Peter Clemoes. In 1992, under the leadership of Michael Lapidge, ASNC became a two-part (three-year) Tripos. The Elrington and Bosworth Professor was customarily the head of the ASNaC Department, until a rotating headship system was introduced during the professorship of Simon Keynes in the early twenty-first century.

The Department runs three annual public lectures: the H. M. Chadwick Lecture, the Kathleen Hughes Memorial Lecture; and the E. C. Quiggin Memorial Lectures. Annual pamphlets are produced on the topic of each lecture.

In 2015 the department was the subject of the scholarly article collection H. M. Chadwick and the Study of Anglo-Saxon, Norse and Celtic in Cambridge, edited by Michael Lapidge (CMCS Publications).

== Major research projects ==
In the 2008 Research Assessment Exercise the department was rated as the top Celtic Studies department in the UK, and one of the top departments and faculties within the University of Cambridge, with 75% of its submitted research rated internationally excellent (3*) or world-leading (4*). Because of its strongly interdisciplinary nature, elements of the Department's research were considered by the panels for History, English and Classics as well as Celtic Studies.

In collaboration with King's College London, since 2005 the department has developed and organised the free-access Prosopography of Anglo-Saxon England.

== Languages taught ==
Language-study is central to ASNaC degree programmes, and the department is a major training ground in these skills for researchers in early medieval history. The department provides ab initio tuition in Old English, Old Norse, Old Irish, Middle Welsh, and Latin.

Despite the Department's medieval focus, its pre-eminence as a UK centre of Scandinavian and Celtic studies has led both the Irish and Icelandic governments to provide grants for the teaching of Modern Irish and Icelandic (respectively) to members of Cambridge University.

== Staff ==
The following table lists lecturers in the department of Anglo-Saxon, Norse and Celtic and its forerunner institutions.

Staff member	Term	Date of matriculation if former ASNaC student
Faculties of English and Modern and Medieval Languages 1878-1927
W. W. Skeat	1878-1912	
Eiríkur Magnússon	1894-98	
Hector Munro Chadwick	1895-1941	
Edmund Crosby Quiggin	1895-1920	
José Maria de Navarro	1926-56	
Maureen M. O'Reilly	1926-48	
Bertha Surtees Phillpotts	1926-32	1898
Department of Anglo-Saxon and Kindred Studies 1927-67 (Faculty of Archaeology and Anthropology)
T. C. Lethbridge	1932-?	
Dorothy M. Hoare de Navarro	1932-56	
Agnes Jane Robertson	1932-35	c. 1918
Kenneth Hurlstone Jackson	1934-39	1928
Peter Hunter Blair	1937-78	
Rachel Bromwich	1945-76	1934
Bruce Dickins	1946-57	
Glyn Daniel	1947-?	
Nora Kershaw Chadwick	1950-58	
Frank J. Bullivant	1956-61	
Audrey E. Ozanne	1956-61	
Dorothy Whitelock	1957-69	1921
Kathleen Hughes	1958-77	
Peter Clemoes	1961-82	1953
R. I. Page	1961-91	
Department of Anglo-Saxon and Kindred Studies 1967-71 (Faculty of English)
Department of Anglo-Saxon, Norse and Celtic 1971- (Faculty of English)
Michael Lapidge	1974-98	
Patrick Sims-Williams	1977-93	c. 1970
David N. Dumville	1977-2005	c. 1970
Simon Keynes	1978-2019	c. 1970
Paul Bibire	1985-99	
Andy Orchard	1991-2000	1983
Erich Poppe	1991-95	
Lesley Abrams	1991-95	
Oliver Padel	1994-?	c. 1968
Máire Ní Mhaonaigh	1995-	
Martin Syrett	1996-2001	1986
Rosalind Love	1998-	c. 1980
Richard Dance	2000-	
Judy Quinn	2000-2024	
Paul Russell	2000-2023	
Haki Antonsson	2001-2004	
Jonathan Grove	2004-2008	
Fiona Edmonds	2005-2015	
Elizabeth Ashman Rowe	2008-	
Alison Bonner	2016-	
Rory Naismith	2019-	2002
Erik Niblaeus	2019-	2002
Ben Guy	2023-	2007
Dale Kedwards	2024-	
Becky Shercliff	2026-	

== Students ==
=== Applications and admissions ===
Between 1900 and 1999, around 860 students studied in the Department or its precursor institutions. Between 1900 and 1946, 68% were women; thereafter there was a slight majority of men until 1980; and rough gender parity 1980-1999.

From 2009 to 2012, between 50 and 60 applicants applied for the ASNC BA per year; about 53% were offered places; and about 43% (20-25 students) accepted their offers. The undergraduate student body was majority female (two-thirds for the 2011 admissions cycle) and had a strong preponderance of state-school leavers (84% of home students for the 2011 admissions cycle).

=== ASNaC Society ===
The department has an affiliated student society, the ASNaC Society. It is recorded as hosting academic papers as early as 1971. According to Michael Lapidge,

From the mid-1980s onward, the combined number of undergraduate and graduate students reached (which might be described as) a critical mass, with the result that there was a very palpable surge in corporate spirit and concomitant pride in being an 'ASNaC', a member of a small but elite group of students distinguished throughout the University for its academic attainments.

The Society organises a weekly 'ASNaC Lunch', field trips, punting expeditions, dinners, and ASNaC mugs and sweatshirts. The Society is also noted for producing the (mostly) twice yearly Gesta Asnacorum, founded by Tom Shakespeare, which satirises the life of the Department and the medieval texts and modern scholarship it studies. Though the Gesta Asnacorum is merely a scurrilous student rag, it does feature the juvenilia of many alumni of the department who have gone on to become prominent historians.

In June 2022, the ASNC society launched a new updated website.

=== Alumni ===
ASNaCs have gone into many walks of life, but a significant proportion of academics in the fields of early medieval European literature and history, particularly in Celtic studies, have studied or taught at the department, making it a historically highly influential institution in its field. Academically prominent alumni of the department or its forerunner institutions who are not listed above as staff include:

- Florence Harmer (completed tripos 1912)
- Derick Smith Thomson (graduated 1948)
- J. W. M. Bannerman (graduated 1958)
- Audrey Meaney (graduated 1959)
- David Denison (graduated 1973)
- Philip Jenkins (graduated 1974)
- Andrew Breeze (matriculated 1972, graduated 1976)
- Sarah Foot (matriculated 1979)
- Julia Crick (matriculated 1982)
- Richard Sharpe (graduated 1977)
- Claire Bishop (art historian) (matriculated 1990)
- Alaric Hall (matriculated 1997, graduated 2000)
- Eleanor Barraclough (matriculated 2003)
- Levi Roach (matriculated 2003)

Other noted alumni include:

- Jane Stevenson — historian and novelist (graduated 1980)
- Tom Shakespeare — academic and disability campaigner (matriculated 1984)
- Stephan Grundy — novelist (graduated 1995)
- Elin Manahan Thomas — opera singer (matriculated 1995, graduated 1998)
- Dan Starkey — actor (matriculated 1996, graduated 1999)
- Rebecca Dowbiggin — rower (matriculated 2001)
- Paul Best — cricketer (matriculated c. 2009)
- Pierre Novellie — comedian (matriculated 2009)
- George Fouracres — actor and comedian (matriculated c. 2009)

== Appearances in popular culture ==
Maria, the protagonist of Thomas Thurman's children's book Not Ordinarily Borrowable; or, Unwelcome Advice (2009), is an Asnac (there characterised as "a person who studies the way people lived a long, long time ago, far longer ago than the time when Maria lived, and looks at the things they made and the writings they left behind").
