= Paul Bibire =

British medievalist

Paul Adrian Bibire (born 1945) is an author and former lecturer in the Department of English Language and Literature at the University of St Andrews (1971–85) and the Department of Anglo-Saxon, Norse and Celtic, University of Cambridge (1985–99). His area is Anglo Saxon and Old Norse and he has written many articles on these and related subjects. Bibire is also a keen enthusiast of the author J. R. R. Tolkien whom he credits as the motivation for his academic career.

Bibire took a BA from Aberystwyth University in 1967, a B.Phil. in Old English at Oxford University in 1969.

He co-edited with Gareth Williams a book entitled Sagas, Saints and Settlements from a 1996 interdisciplinary symposium at the University of St Andrews, exploring the history, culture, and literature of the Viking Age and medieval Iceland and Scandinavia. (Sagas, Saints and Sacrifice is the same book under a previous title.)
