= James H. Rowe =

American lawyer (1909–1984)

James H. Rowe Jr.
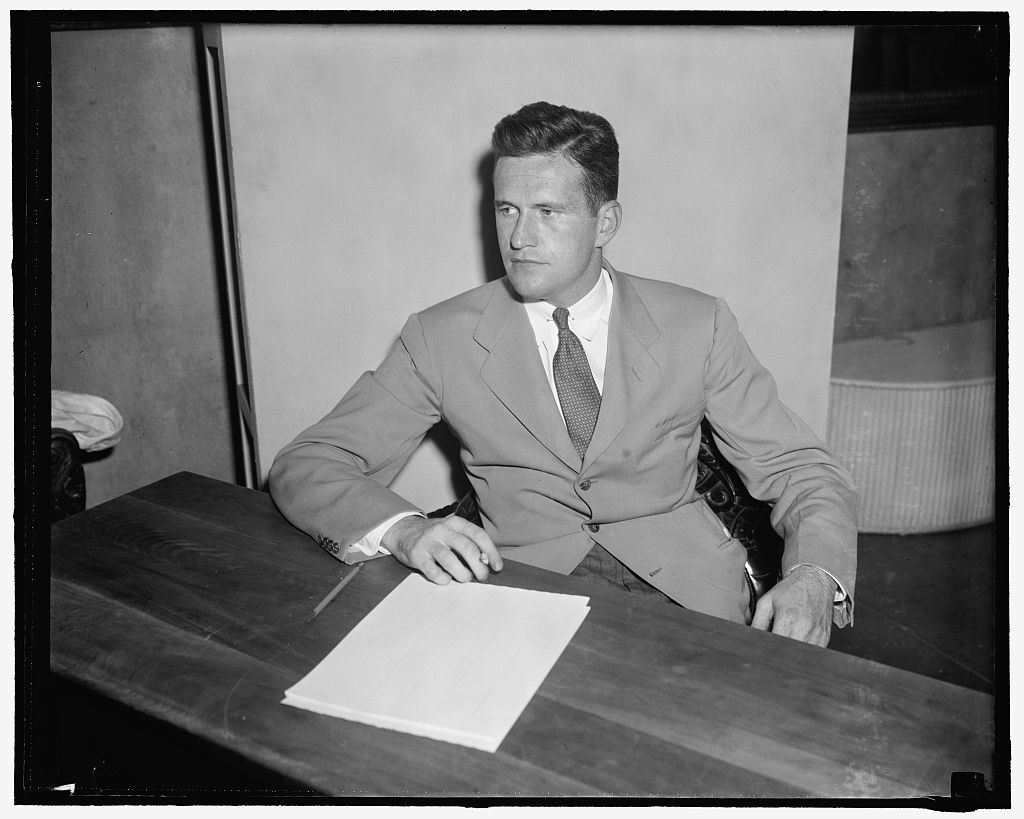
- Rowe in 1939
- Born: June 1, 1909; Butte, Montana, U.S.
- Died: June 17, 1984 (aged 75); Washington, D.C., U.S.
- Education: Harvard College; Harvard Law School
- Occupation: Lawyer
- Spouse: Elizabeth Ulman Rowe

James H. Rowe Jr. (June 1, 1909 – June 17, 1984) was an American lawyer and New Dealer who was selected by President Harry Truman to work on the Commission on Organization of the Executive Branch of the Government, commonly known as the Hoover Commission. He was a political strategist in the Democratic Party and is best known for his memo to Truman on re-election strategy. He was an advisor to both Lyndon B. Johnson and Hubert Humphrey.

== Early life and education ==
Rowe was born to James Rowe and his wife, in Butte, Montana.

Rowe attended Harvard University, where he earned his undergraduate degree, and then Harvard Law School, where he earned his law degree.

== Career ==
After graduating, Rowe held the office of Secretary to US Supreme Court Associate Justice Oliver Wendell Holmes Jr. In 1935, he moved over to the Reconstruction Finance Corporation, where he served as a legal adviser; he spent most of the rest of 1935 to 1939 moving from one New Deal agency to another before he was, from 1939 to 1941, Administrative Assistant to the President Franklin D. Roosevelt.

In 1941 to 1945, during the Second World War, Rowe undertook double duty as a member of the US Naval Reserve and as US Assistant Attorney General. Former Attorney General Francis Beverley Biddle brought Jim Rowe with him when Biddle was assigned to be a judge at the Nuremberg trials. Rowe and Adrian Fisher, with Robert Stewart, Judge John J. Parker's assistant, drafted the judgments that the American judges would make on each defendant.

After the war, he moved over to the Bureau of the Budget where he worked with Director James E. Webb to balance the US budget. From there, he moved to the Hoover Commission. Rowe's demands from the commission ensured that its final report would be delayed until after November 1948 election.

Indeed, Rowe played another role before the election; he was a member of the six-men legal team that fought in September 1948 to get Lyndon B. Johnson on the ballot as the Democratic Party's choice as the US Senator from Texas. The other five members of the elite legal team were Abe Fortas, Thomas Gardiner Corcoran, former 58th U.S. Attorney General, Francis Beverley Biddle, Joseph L. Rauh Jr., and Benjamin V. Cohen.

Rowe continued public sector employment during the Truman administration and ended up in the US Department of State. With the rise of the Eisenhower administration, Rowe returned to the private sector and resumed his legal practice.

In the private sector, Rowe still maintained his activism within the political process in the Democratic Party. In 1960, he was the campaign manager in Lyndon B. Johnson's unsuccessful bid to become the President. In 1968, he served as Campaign Manager for Hubert H. Humphrey in his unsuccessful bid to become the President. In 1972, he aligned with forces intent on denying the Democratic presidential nomination to George McGovern by maneuver in the Credentials Committee prior to the nominating convention. "(T)he majority of us Democrats don't like McGovern; and so long as we have any power left, we plan to use it," he said.

In addition, in 1965 to 1971, Rowe served as a member of Harvard University's Board of Overseers.

== Personal life and death ==
Rowe married Elizabeth Holmes Ulman on September 6, 1937, at her parents’ home in Washington, DC. They had three children: Elizabeth, Clarissa, and James.

Rowe died on June 17, 1984, in Washington, D.C. His obituary appeared in the New York Times on June 19, 1984.

== Bibliography ==
- Caro, Robert A. (2002). The Years of Lyndon Johnson: Master of the Senate. New York, N.Y.: Alfred A. Knopf.
