= Maureen O'Reilly =

British academic and curator (b. 1902)

Maureen Hutton
- Born: Maureen Margaret O'Reilly; 1902; London
- Occupation: Assistant curator
- Spouse: John Henry Hutton

Academic background
- Education: Girton College, Cambridge

Academic work
- Discipline: Anglo-Saxon archaeology
- Institutions: Museum of Archaeology and Anthropology
- Notable students: Mary Kitson Clark

Maureen Margaret O’Reilly (married name Hutton, born 1902) was a British academic who taught Anglo-Saxon archaeology and Anglo-Saxon, Norse and Celtic languages at the University of Cambridge and was an assistant curator of the Museum of Archaeology and Ethnography in the 1920s and 30s.

== Early life and education ==
Maureen O'Reilly was born in London in 1902 to Northern Irish dispensing chemist's assistant Henry Osborne O’Reilly and his wife Helen, née Kent. She was educated at Croydon High School.

== University of Cambridge ==
O'Reilly won a Clothworkers' Scholarship to study English and Anglo-Saxon archaeology at Girton College, Cambridge from1920 to 1923. She then received an Old Girtonians' Research Studentship for 1923–24.

In 1925 she published her most substantial work, a report on the excavation of an Anglo-Saxon cemetery at Girton College.

In the 1920s and 1930s, O'Reilly taught prehistoric and Anglo-Saxon archaeology, including giving practical demonstrations with Margaret Murray, and was one of the staff of the Department of Anglo-Saxon and Kindred Studies. Her students included Mary Kitson Clark, who reflected that 'The star at the Museum was Miles Burkitt for the Palaeolithic but Maureen took me for everything else.'

She received an MA in 1937.

== Curator ==
In 1930, O'Reilly was appointed assistant curator at the Museum of Archaeology and Ethnology by Louis Clarke. Taking over from Cyril Fox, she was tasked with cataloguing and making accessible the museum's growing collection. This made her the "first woman to be formally elected to a paid position at a Cambridge Museum." William Ridgeway, thinking this an inappropriate post for a woman, encouraged T. C. Lethbridge to take the position instead, but Lethbridge yielded it to O’Reilly. She remained in the post for fifteen years, and she and Lethbridge were responsible for distributing the museum's artefacts for safekeeping during World War II. O'Reilly is also known for her behind-the-scenes work at the museum, managing it when Clarke was in ill health and using her acquaintance with board members' bedders, charwomen and clerks to influence votes in her favour.

== Personal life ==
In 1946 O'Reilly became the second wife of John Henry Hutton, a professor of anthropology in her department.

Maureen was a keen baker and supplied cakes and biscuits to the members of her faculty every weekday from 1925 until 1946.
