= Richard Sharpe (historian) =

British historian (1954–2020)

Richard Sharpe (17 February 1954 – 22 March 2020) was a British historian and academic, who was Professor of Diplomatic at the University of Oxford and a fellow of Wadham College, Oxford. His broad interests were the history of medieval England, Ireland, Scotland and Wales. He had a special concern with first-hand work on the primary sources of medieval history, including the practices of palaeography, diplomatic and the editorial process, as well as the historical and legal contexts of medieval documents. He was the general editor of the Corpus of British Medieval Library Catalogues, and editor of a forthcoming edition of the charters of King Henry I of England.

== Biography ==
Sharpe studied at St Peter's School, York and then took his BA at Trinity College, Cambridge, studying Classics for Part I of the degree and then Anglo Saxon, Norse and Celtic for Part II, where he studied with, amongst others, Simon Keynes, Kathleen Hughes and Michael Lapidge. He graduated with a first in 1977, and published his first book, a history of Raasay the same year. Sharpe stayed in the ASNaC department for his PhD, on Latin-language Irish hagiography, which was the basis for his 1991 Medieval Irish Saints' Lives: an introduction to 'Vitae sanctorum Hiberniae'. From 1981 to 1990, Sharpe was an assistant editor of the Dictionary of Medieval Latin from British Sources.

As the University of Oxford's 2018–2019 Lyell Reader in Bibliography, Sharpe delivered that year's Lyell Lectures on the topic of "Libraries and Books in Medieval England: The Role of Libraries in a Changing Book Economy". He was elected a Fellow of the British Academy (FBA) in 2003, and an Honorary Member of the Royal Irish Academy in 2018. In 2020, he was elected a Corresponding Fellow of the Medieval Academy of America.

== Publications ==
Books as author

- Sharpe, Richard (1977). Raasay: a study in island history. London: Grant and Cutler. ISBN 978-0-7293-0029-2.
- Sharpe, Richard (1978). Raasay: A Study in Island History. Documents and Sources, People and Places. London: Grant and Cutler. ISBN 978-8439965473.
- Sharpe, Richard; Lapidge, Michael (1985). A bibliography of Celtic-Latin literature 400-1200. Royal Irish Academy dictionary of medieval Latin from Celtic sources. Ancillary publications; 1. Dublin: Royal Irish Academy. ISBN 0901714437.
- Sharpe, Richard (1991). Medieval Irish Saints' Lives: an introduction to Vitae sanctorum Hiberniae. Oxford: Clarendon Press. ISBN 978-0-19-167821-9.
- Sharpe, Richard (1991). Life of St. Columba. Harmondsworth, Middlesex: Penguin Books. ISBN 978-0-14-044462-9.
- Sharpe, Richard; Carley, James P.; Thomson, Rodney M.; Watson, Andrew G. (1996). English Benedictine Libraries: the shorter catalogues. Corpus of British medieval library catalogues. London: British Library. ISBN 0-7123-0336-7.
- Sharpe, Richard (1997). A Handlist of the Latin Writers of Great Britain and Ireland before 1540. Publications of the Journal of Medieval Latin. Turnhout: Brepols. ISBN 978-2-503-50575-6.
- Sharpe, Richard (2003). Titulus: identifying medieval Latin texts. An evidence-based approach. Brepols essays in European culture. Turnhout: Brepols. ISBN 978-2-503-51258-7.
- Sharpe, Richard (2006). Norman rule in Cumbria, 1092–1136. Cumberland and Westmorland Antiquarian and Archaeological Society, Tract Series. Vol. 21. Kendal: Cumberland and Westmorland Antiquarian and Archaeological Society. ISBN 9781873124437.
- Sharpe, Richard (2023). Willoughby, James M. W. (ed.). Libraries and Books in Medieval England: The Role of Libraries in a Changing Book Economy. Oxford: Bodleian Library Publishing.

Professional and academic associations
Preceded by Richard Barrie Dobson	President of the Surtees Society; 2002–20	Succeeded by Angus J. L. Winchester
