= Lesley Abrams =

Canadian historian

Lesley Abrams FSA FRHistS
- Born: 1952 (age 73–74); Ottawa, Ontario, Canada
- Occupation: Academic historian

Lesley Jane Abrams (born 1952) is a retired academic historian. She was a Colyer-Ferguson Fellow of Balliol College, Oxford, between 2000 and 2016, and Professor of Early Medieval History at the University of Oxford from 2015 to 2016.

== Career ==
Lesley Jane Abrams was born in 1952 in Ottawa, Ontario, Canada. She completed a Bachelor of Arts degree at the University of Toronto between 1969 and 1973, and was then a British Commonwealth Scholar at St Hilda's College, Oxford, graduating with a Bachelor of Arts (BA) degree in 1975. She then completed a Master of Arts (MA) degree at the Centre for Medieval Studies in Toronto in 1979 and took her doctorate of philosophy (PhD) there in 1991. Between then and 1995, she lectured in the Department of Anglo-Saxon, Norse and Celtic at Cambridge University, and then lectured at Aberystwyth University until 2000, when she was appointed Colyer-Fergusson Fellow and Tutor in Modern History at Balliol College, Oxford. In 2015, she was appointed a Professor of Early Medieval History at the University of Oxford, and retired from teaching the following year.

Abrams also lectured at Brasenose College, Oxford, and was elected a Fellow of the Society of Antiquaries in 1996 and a Fellow of the Royal Historical Society.

== Works ==
Abrams has carried out research into the conversion of northern European peoples to Christianity in the early medieval period, focusing on the English and Scandinavians. More broadly, she has studied many aspects of Scandinavian history in this period, ranging from military activity to overseas connections and settlements. Her published works include:

- "Early Normandy", Anglo-Norman Studies, vol. 35 (2013), pp. 45–64
- "Diaspora and Identity in the Viking Age", Early Medieval Europe, vol. 20 (2012), pp. 17–38
- "Conversion and the Church in Viking-Age Ireland", in The Viking Age: Ireland and the West, Proceedings of the Fifteenth Viking Congress, ed. by J. Sheehan and D. Ó Corráin (2010), pp. 1–10
- "Early Religious Practice in the Greenland Settlement", Journal of the North Atlantic, special vol. 2 (2009), pp. 52–65
- "King Edgar and the Men of the Danelaw", in Edgar, King of the English, 959–975, ed. by D. Scragg (2008), pp. 171–191
- "Germanic Christianities, 600–1100", in Cambridge History of Christianity, ed. by T. Noble and J. M. H. Smith (2008), pp. 107–129
- "Conversion and the Church in the Hebrides in the Viking Age: 'A Very Difficult Thing Indeed'", in West Over Sea. Studies in Scandinavian Sea-borne Expansion and Settlement before 1300, ed. by B. Ballin-Smith and S. Taylor (2007), pp. 169–193
- "Les fondations scandinaves en angleterre", in Les fondations scandinaves en Occident et les débuts du duché Normandie, ed. by P. Bauduin et al. (2005), pp. 133–145
- "Scandinavian Place-Names and Settlement-History: Flegg, Norfolk", in Viking and Norse in the North Atlantic: Select Papers from the Proceedings of the Fourteenth Viking Congress, ed. by A. Mortensen and S. Arge (2005), pp. 307–322
- "Place-Names and the History of Scandinavian Settlement in England", in Land, Sea and Home: Proceedings of a Conference on Viking-Period Settlement, ed. by J. Hines et al. (2004), pp. 379–431
- "The Early Danelaw: Conquest, Transition, and Assimilation", in La progression des Vikings, des raids a la colonisation, ed. by A.-M. Flambard Héricher (2003), pp. 57–70
- "England, Normandy, and Scandinavia", in A Companion to the Anglo-Norman World, ed. by C. Harper-Bill and E. van Houts (2003), pp. 43–62
- "The Conversion of the Danelaw", in Vikings and the Danelaw: Select Papers from the Proceedings of the Thirteenth Viking Congress, Nottingham and New York, 21–30 August 1997, ed. by J. Graham-Campbell et al. (2001), pp. 31–44
- "Edward the Elder's Danelaw", in Edward the Elder, 899–924, ed. by D. Scragg (2001), pp. 128–143
- "Conversion and Assimilation", in Cultures in Contact: Scandinavian Settlement in England in the Ninth and Tenth Centuries, ed. by D. M. Hadley and J. D. Richards (Turnhout, 2000), pp. 135–153
- "The Conversion of the Scandinavians of Dublin", Anglo Norman Studies, vol. 20 (1998), pp. 1–29
- Anglo-Saxon Glastonbury: Church and Endowment (1996)
- "The Anglo-Saxons and the Christianization of Scandinavia", Anglo-Saxon England, vol. 24 (1995), pp. 213–249
- "Eleventh-Century Missions and the Early Stages of Ecclesiastical Organization in Scandinavia", Anglo-Norman Studies, vol. 17 (1994), pp. 21–40
- with J. P. Carley (eds.), The Archaeology and History of Glastonbury Abbey: Essays in Honour of the Ninetieth Birthday of C. A. Ralegh Radford (1991)
