= Elizabeth Ulman Rowe =

Leader in urban planning

Elizabeth "Libby" Ulman Rowe
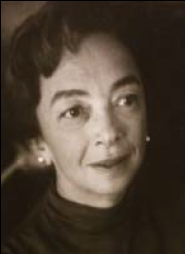
- Born: 1912; Salisbury, Maryland, U.S.
- Died: March 11, 1991 (aged 79); Washington, D.C., U.S.
- Education: Potomac School, Madeira School, Bryn Mawr College

Elizabeth "Libby" Ulman Rowe (née Ulman; 1912-March 11, 1991) was the first female commissioner and chair (1961-1968) of the National Capital Planning Commission. A strong supporter of mass transit and height limits for buildings in Washington, D.C., she influenced the capital's urban planning in the late 20th century.

== Early life and education ==
Elizabeth Ulman was born in 1912 in Salisbury, Maryland. Soon after, her parents, both from Washington, D.C., moved back to the capital with their three-month-old daughter. The family lived on 19th Street NW.

Ulman attended the Potomac School, an independent day school, and subsequently the Madeira School, a private preparatory school for girls, both then located in Washington, D.C. She graduated from Bryn Mawr College in 1935 with a degree in history.

== Career ==
Ulman began her career in public service with jobs at the National Institute of Public Affairs and the General Accounting Office, eventually pursuing roles supporting U.S. labor. In the mid-1930s, she served as the women’s page editor for the United Mine Workers Journal. When she married James H. Rowe Jr., in 1937, the UMW immediately forced her resignation, then refusing to keep married women on staff.

Aligned with her husband’s New Deal politics, Rowe supported President Franklin D. Roosevelt's campaigns and administration. Before her marriage, she volunteered for his 1932 and 1936 presidential campaigns, writing supporters' speeches for mining communities. During World War II, she worked for the International Labor Office.

Rowe briefly left the workforce in the 1950s to raise the couple’s three children. But she stayed informed and involved with local politics, serving on the D.C. Auditorium Commission (a precursor of the Committee for the Kennedy Center). Lyndon B. Johnson, then Senate majority leader and a friend, secured the appointment for her. When the group visited the National Capital Planning Commission in 1954, Rowe observed proposed highway models. Alarmed by the possible destruction of D.C. neighborhoods, she took an active interest in city planning.

In a move that advanced her own political career, Rowe supported John F. Kennedy's 1960 presidential campaign. She took an active role, helping manage the inaugural parade and working closely with Jacqueline Kennedy. Rowe's efforts earned President Kennedy's appreciation, and he appointed her to the National Capital Planning Commission in 1961. She was the planning agency’s first female commissioner. That same year, Kennedy elevated Rowe to chair.

She soon developed a reputation for opposing highways, preserving neighborhoods, supporting a subway system, and protecting low-income residents from disruptive urban renewal projects. Washington media and politicians openly criticized her. Nonetheless, her public positions lent legitimacy to growing local coalitions opposing highway, redevelopment, and construction projects that threatened the capital’s landscape and residents. She also buoyed new historic preservation efforts in D.C., establishing the District’s first preservation committee in 1964: the Joint Committee on Landmarks.

Rowe served as NCPC chair for seven years. Following her tenure, she remained active in D.C.'s planning and preservation scenes. In addition to maintaining memberships with groups such as the White House Historical Association, Rowe held terms as chairman for both the Committee of 100 on the Federal City and the Parks and History Association.

== Death ==
A longtime resident of Washington, D.C., Rowe, 79, died of pneumonia on March 11, 1991, at George Washington University Hospital.

== Awards ==
- Renchart Prize for Historic Preservation, Columbia Historical Society, 1985
- Lifetime Achievement Award, Committee of 100 on the Federal City, 2011 (posthumous)
