= Clement Scotus II =

Irish grammarian

Clement Scotus II (fl. 820) was an Irish grammarian.

== Life ==
Clement Scotus II arrived, according to tradition, from Ireland on the coast of Gaul, with another Irish scholar, around the time when Charlemagne began his sole rule (i.e. after the death of Carloman in 771). The two men were received at the Frankish court, and Clement was entrusted with the education of a number of pupils. The account of Clement's appearance in the Frankish realm rests solely upon the authority of the monk of St. Gall, who wrote towards the end of the ninth century, and whose narrative contains an element of fable.

Clement is mentioned in a catalogue of the abbots of Fulda: Ratgar, who was abbot from 802 to 817, sent a certain Modestus and other monks to Clement the Scot to learn grammar. Clement was, then or later, resident at the Frankish court; there is a poem by him addressed to Lothar as emperor (i.e. after 817), from which it appears that Lothar was his pupil; and another poem, by Ermoldus Nigellus, describes Clement as active in the festivities at Ingelheim on the occasion of the baptism of the Danish king Harald in 826.

The year of Clement's death is not known, but the day is given as 29 March in a necrology preserved in a Würzburg manuscript of the ninth century. His character is celebrated in a poem by Prudens, otherwise unknown, who ranks him first among the teachers in the palace school.

== Works ==
Two grammatical works exist in manuscript bearing Clement's name; one is an 'Ars Grammatica' (also described as 'De Partibus Orationis'), the other, which is possibly only a part of the same, 'De Barbarismo.'

== Confusion of names ==
This Clement Scotus has been misidentified, firstly with Clement Scotus I, the opponent of St. Boniface, and secondly with Claudius, bishop of Turin, who died about 839, and was Spanish. In consequence of this confusion the two Clements and Claudius have been called 'Clemens Claudius' or 'Claudius Clemens'. The distinction between the three men was examined by Nicolaus Antonius, 'Bibliotheca Hispana vetus,' i. 469-61 (Madrid, 1788).
