= Elizabeth Ashman Rowe =

American historian

Academic background
- Education: Cornell University

Academic work
- Discipline: Scandinavian history
- Institutions: Department of Anglo-Saxon, Norse and Celtic, University of Cambridge

Elizabeth Ashman Rowe is an American historian and author who specializes in the study of the history and culture of the Viking Age.

== Biography ==
Elizabeth Ashman Rowe received her BA magna cum laude and her PhD from Cornell University, with the dissertation, Fables in the best of sagas: Studies in the genre of the Old Norse mythic-heroic saga. She subsequently taught medieval literature, medieval history, and medieval palaeography at Stanford University, the University of California, Berkeley, and the University of Massachusetts Lowell.

Since 2008, Rowe has been Lecturer in Scandinavian History at the Department of Anglo-Saxon, Norse and Celtic, University of Cambridge, and the leader of the medieval section of the International Manuscript Summer School. She is a Fellow of Clare Hall, Cambridge and the Society of Antiquaries of London.

She specializes in the study of history and culture Medieval Iceland and Medieval Norway. She has published a number of articles and encyclopedia entries, and several books, including The Medieval Annals of Iceland, The Development of Flateyjarbók: Iceland and the Norwegian Dynastic Crisis of 1389 and Ragnarr Loðbrók in Medieval Icelandic Historiography. She has been an expert commentator on several programs about Vikings, including on BBC and The History Channel. Rowe was a Historical Consultant and writer for the video game Hellblade: Senua's Sacrifice.

== Selected works ==
- The Development of Flateyjarbók: Iceland and the Norwegian Dynastic Crisis of 1389, 2005
- Vikings in the West : The Legend of Ragnarr Loðbrók and His Sons, 2012
