= Clement Scotus I =

Irish Christian bishop, 8th century

Clement Scotus I (fl. 745) was a bishop.

== Biography ==
Doubtless a native of Ireland, Clement Scotus lived in the Frankish realm in the time of St. Boniface, who was then archbishop of Mentz. He contended against Boniface's attempts to introduce the complete Roman discipline into Germany, but in vain. The archbishop cited him before a synod in 743 or 744, at which Carloman and Pepin were present. Clement was deprived of his priesthood and imprisoned for his acts and opinions, which it deemed heretical. Pope Zacharias, to whom the affair was reported, approved Boniface's action and confirmed the former part of the sentence. The charges against Clement were first, that he had a wife—although Boniface calls her a concubine—and two children; more than this, that he justified marriage with a deceased brother's wife, in conformity with the Jewish law.

=== Religious beliefs ===
In dogmatic theology Clement held views which seemed to contradict the Latin doctrine of predestination. He also asserted that Christ on rising from the dead 'delivered all who had been Kept in prison, faithful and unbelievers, worshippers of God as well as idolaters.' This description, drawn by his enemy, probably indicates that Clement maintained a universalism of some sort.

=== Accusations of heresy ===
He was also accused of denying the canons of the church and rejecting the authority of Saint Jerome, Saint Augustine, and Saint Gregory. He had in fact brought into collision with the rigour of Latin Christianity those freer usages and more speculative habits of thought which prevailed in the Church of Ireland, at this time the fountain-head of literary culture and missionary enterprise for the west of Europe.

The German opponents of Boniface, who seem to have been in a majority, must have supported Clement. When the matter was brought before a synod at Rome, on 25 Oct. 745 (not 746 or 748, as was formerly supposed), Deneard, Boniface's representative, stated that the archbishop was powerless to close his mouth. The synod confirmed Boniface's action, anathematised Clement, and once more declared him to be deprived of his orders. But in spite of this sentence Clement persisted in his opinions, and so soon as 5 Jan. 747 we find the pope writing again to Boniface, enjoining him to re-examine the whole question at a council which was shortly to be held in Germany, and to do his best to bring Clement to repentance; should he prove contumacious, he was to be sent on to Rome.

The outcome of the affair is not known; but it is probable that Clement's case from the beginning was prejudiced by the fact that his opinions were mixed up in all the proceedings with those of a certain Adelbert, who held views of a very fanatical character. Clement, on the other hand, to judge even from the meagre and distorted accounts of his doctrine which we possess, seems to represent in some ways the free characteristics of Irish theology expressed in the writings of his countryman, John Scotus, a century later.

This Clement has been often confounded with Clement Scotus II; cf. Dempster, 'Hist. Eccl. Gent. Scot.' iii. 177, 178.
