= Kathleen Hughes (historian) =

English historian (1926-1977)

Kathleen Winifred Hughes (8 September 1926, Middlesbrough – 20 April 1977) was an English historian. Her specialisation was Irish ecclesiastical history, particularly the early Christian Church in Ireland.

Hughes remains a highly regarded historian over thirty years after her early death. A mark of this respect was demonstrated with the inclusion of two of her articles in volume one of A New History of Ireland, published in 2006. Despite both having been written in 1974, they were included because:

"[S]he was one of the most distinguished early Irish church historian(s) of her generation", and as they had "been heralded as forthcoming since her death. The editors therefore felt that it was only right to print the chapters as she wrote; Dr. Ann Hamlin, a friend of Kathleen Hughes, kindly undertook to complete the footnote reference and to update them where necessary."

Hughes earned her Ph.D. in London, and became a fellow at Newnham College, Cambridge. She was the Nora Chadwick Reader in Celtic Studies, Department of Anglo-Saxon, Norse and Celtic, University of Cambridge. Among her best-known works was The Modern Traveller to the Early Irish Church, which was co-written with Dr. Hamlin.

In 1973 she delivered the British Academy's Sir John Rhŷs Memorial Lecture.

Ireland in Early Mediaeval Europe: Studies in Memory of Kathleen Hughes was published in 1981 and edited by Dorothy Whitelock, Rosamond McKitterick and David Dumville. Hughes is also commemorated by the Kathleen Hughes Fund. In 2000, Hughes Hall, Cambridge instituted the annual Kathleen Hughes Memorial Lecture, a pamphlet is produced for each lecture by the Department of Anglo-Saxon, Norse & Celtic.

== Bibliography ==
=== Articles ===
- The Distribution of Irish Scriptoria and Centres of Learning from 730 to 1111, pp. 243–72, in Studies in the Early British Church, ed. Nora Chadwick, Cambridge, 1958.
- The Celtic Church and the Papacy, pp. 1–28, in The English Church and the Papacy in the Middle Ages, ed. C.H. Laurence, London, 1965.
- Some Aspects of Irish Influence on Early English Private Prayer, pp. 48–61, Studia Celtica 5, 1970.
- Sancity and Secularity in the Early Irish Church, pp. 21-37, in Studies in Church History 10, 1973.
- Synodus II S.Patricii, in Latin Script and Letters, ed. J.J. O'Mara and B. Naumann, Leiden, 1976.
- The Celtic Church: Is this a valid concept?, pp. 1–20 Cambridge Medieval Celtic Studies i, summer 1981.
- In A New History of Ireland, volume one, 2006, ed. Dáibhí Ó Cróinín;
  - The Church in Irish Society, 400-800, pp. 301–330.
  - The Irish Church, 800-c.1050, pp. 635–655.

=== Books ===
- The Church in Early Irish Society, London, 1966.
- Early Christian Ireland: An introduction to the sources, London, 1972.
- The Modern Traveller to the Early Irish Church, London, 1977 (with Ann Hamlin).
- Celtic Britain in the Early Middle Ages, Woodbridge, 1980.
- Church and Society in Ireland, A.D. 400-1200, ed. David Dumville, 1987.

=== Lectures ===
- Early Christianity in Pictland; Jarrow lecture, 1970 (published in Hughes, 1980, above, pp. 1–16)
- The Early Celtic Idea of History and the Modern Historian: An Inaugural Lecture, Cambridge, 1977.

=== Other ===
- Introduction to A History of Medieval Ireland by A.J. Otway-Ruthven.
