= Sir Israel Gollancz Prize =

Biannual British Academy award

Sir Israel Gollancz Prize is awarded biannually by the British Academy in honour of Israel Gollancz, a founder member and its first secretary, since 1924. Originally named "Biennial Prize for English Literature" and renamed after Gollancz's death in 1930, the award was established on the initiative of Frida Mond. It is awarded to scholars of Old and Early English language and literature and history of the English language.

== Winners ==
The following have received the prize:

- 1925: Joseph Wright
- 1927: R. W. Chambers
- 1929: Professor Allen Mawer
- 1931: H. C. K. Wyld
- 1933: C. T. Onions
- 1935: Sir W. A. Craigie
- 1937: C. S. Lewis
- 1939: J. M. Manly
- 1941: Karl Young
- 1943–1950: No award
- 1951: Dorothy Whitelock
- 1953: Kenneth Sisam
- 1955: Bruce Dickins
- 1957: Florence Harmer
- 1959: Neil Ker
- 1963: George Kane
- 1965: Albert Hugh Smith
- 1969: Kenneth Cameron
- 1971: Phyllis Hodgson
- 1973: Norman Davis
- 1975: Rosemary Woolf
- 1977: E. J. Dobson
- 1979: J. A. W. Bennett
- 1981: A. J. Aitken
- 1983: Ian Doyle
- 1985: Anne Hudson
- 1987: Bruce Mitchell
- 1989: Angus McIntosh
- 1991: Anne Hudson
- 1993: Patrick Sims-Williams
- 1995: H. Leith Spencer
- 1997: Fred Robinson
- 1999: George Kane (2nd award)
- 2001: Malcolm Godden and Peter Clemoes
- 2003: Robert Lewis
- 2005: Patrick P. O'Neill
- 2007: William James Simpson
- 2009: Michael Lapidge
- 2011: Jill Mann
- 2013: Leslie Lockett
- 2015: Ralph Hanna
- 2017: Helmut Gneuss
- 2019: David Wallace "for his lifetime contribution into the study of Chaucer and Medieval English literature"
- 2021: Richard Dance, Sara Pons-Sanz, and Brittany Schorn (The Gersum Project), "for its innovative contribution to the study of the etymology of Middle English"
- 2022: David Lawton
- 2024: Aaron Kleist

== See also ==
- Awards of the British Academy
