= William Camden =

English antiquarian (1551–1623)

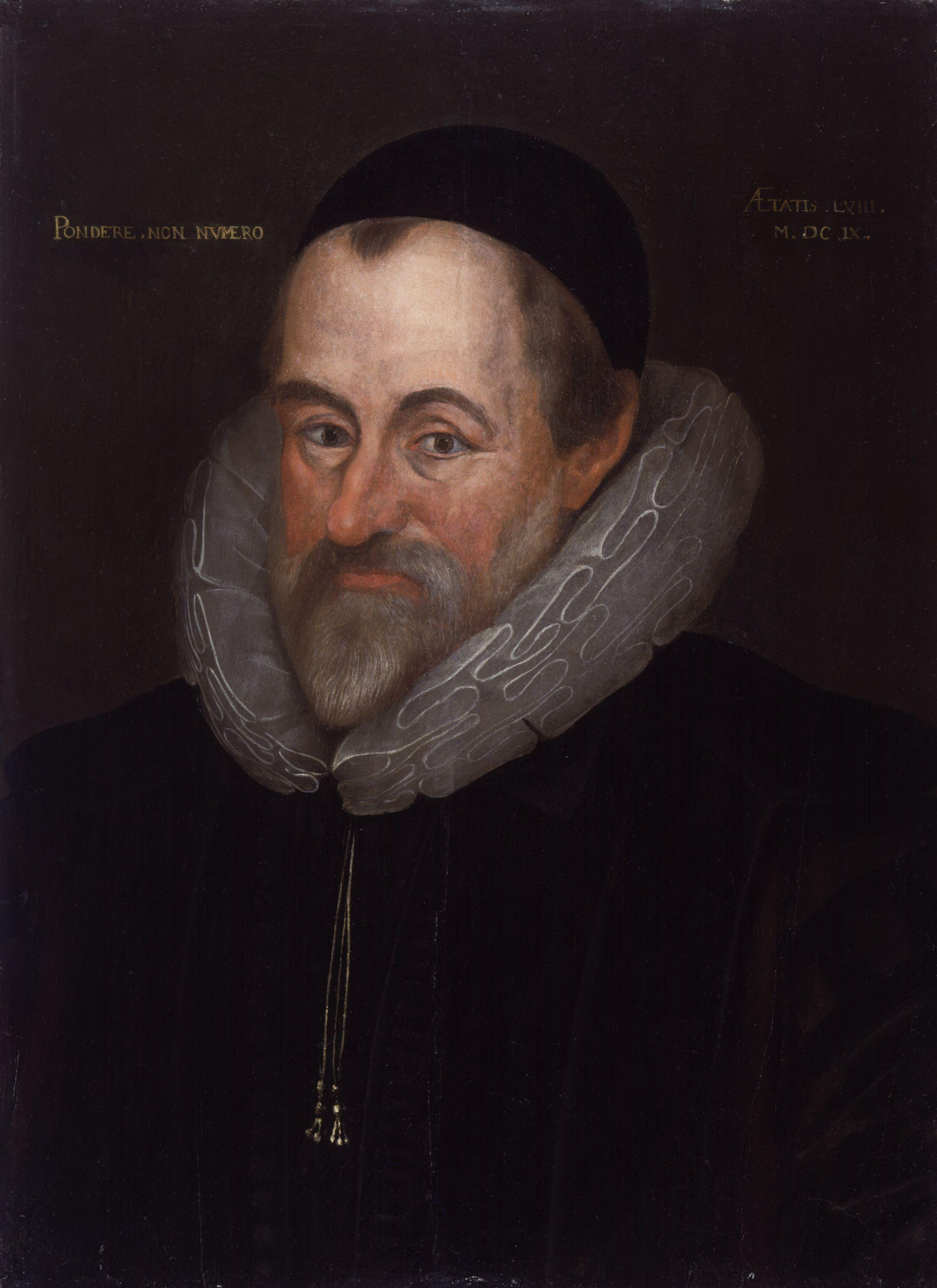
- William Camden
- Born: 2 May 1551; London, England
- Died: 9 November 1623 (aged 72); Chislehurst, England
- Occupations: Antiquarian, historian, topographer

William Camden (2 May 1551 – 9 November 1623) was an English antiquarian, historian, topographer, and herald, best known as author of Britannia, the first chorographical survey of the islands of Great Britain and Ireland that relates landscape, geography, antiquarianism, and history, and the Annales, the first detailed historical account of the reign of Elizabeth I.

== Early years ==
William Camden was born in London. His father Sampson Camden was a member of The Worshipful Company of Painter-Stainers. He attended Christ's Hospital and St Paul's School, and in 1566 entered Oxford (Magdalen College, Broadgates Hall, and finally Christ Church). At Christ Church, he became acquainted with Philip Sidney, who encouraged Camden's antiquarian interests. He returned to London in 1571 without a degree. In 1575, he became Usher of Westminster School, a position that gave him the freedom to travel and pursue his antiquarian researches during school vacations.

== Britannia ==
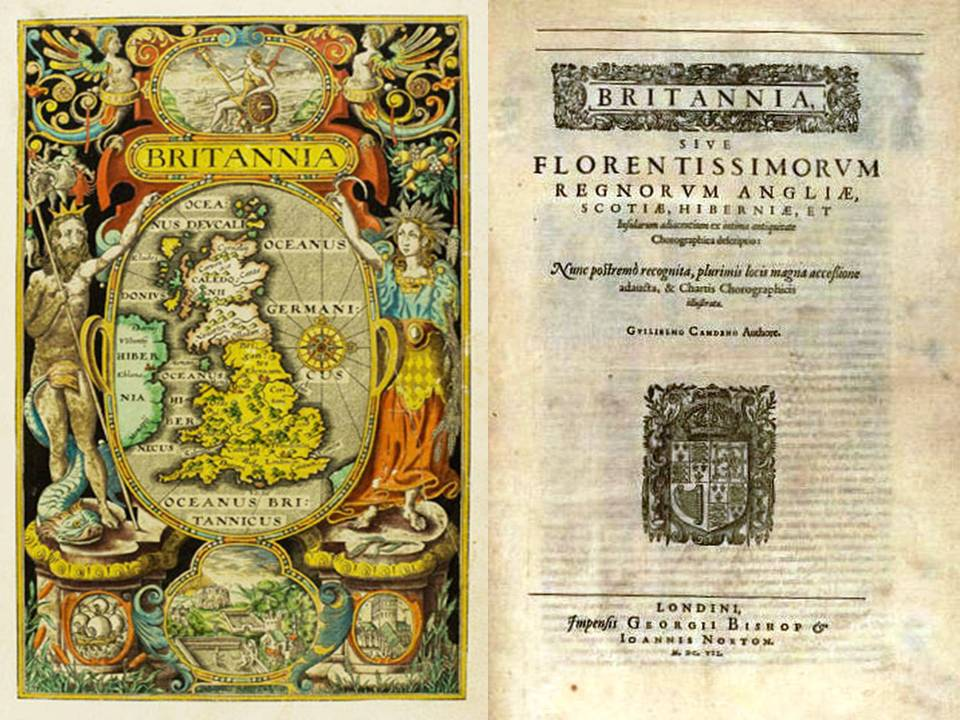
Hand-coloured frontispiece and title page of the 1607 edition of Britannia

In 1577, with the encouragement of Abraham Ortelius, Camden began his great work Britannia, a topographical and historical survey of all of Great Britain and Ireland. His stated intention was to "restore antiquity to Britaine, and Britain to his antiquity". The first edition, written in Latin, was published in 1586. It proved very popular, and ran through five further Latin editions, of 1587, 1590, 1594, 1600 and 1607, each greatly enlarged from its predecessor in both textual content and illustrations. The 1607 edition included for the first time a full set of English county maps, based on the surveys of Christopher Saxton and John Norden, and engraved by William Kip and William Hole (who also engraved the fine frontispiece). The first English-language edition, translated by Philemon Holland, appeared in 1610, again with some additional content supplied by Camden.

Britannia is a county-by-county description of Great Britain and Ireland. It is a work of chorography: a study that relates landscape, geography, antiquarianism, and history. Rather than write a history, Camden wanted to describe in detail the Great Britain of the present, and to show how the traces of the past could be discerned in the existing landscape. By this method, he produced the first coherent picture of Roman Britain.

He continued to collect materials and to revise and expand Britannia throughout his life. He drew on the published and unpublished work of John Leland and William Lambarde, among others, and received the assistance of a large network of correspondents with similar interests. He also travelled throughout Great Britain to view documents, sites, and artefacts for himself: he is known to have visited East Anglia in 1578, Yorkshire and Lancashire in 1582, Devon in 1589, Wales in 1590, Salisbury, Wells and Oxford in 1596, and Carlisle and Hadrian's Wall in 1599. His fieldwork and firsthand research set new standards for the time. He even learned Welsh and Old English for the task: his tutor in Old English was Laurence Nowell.

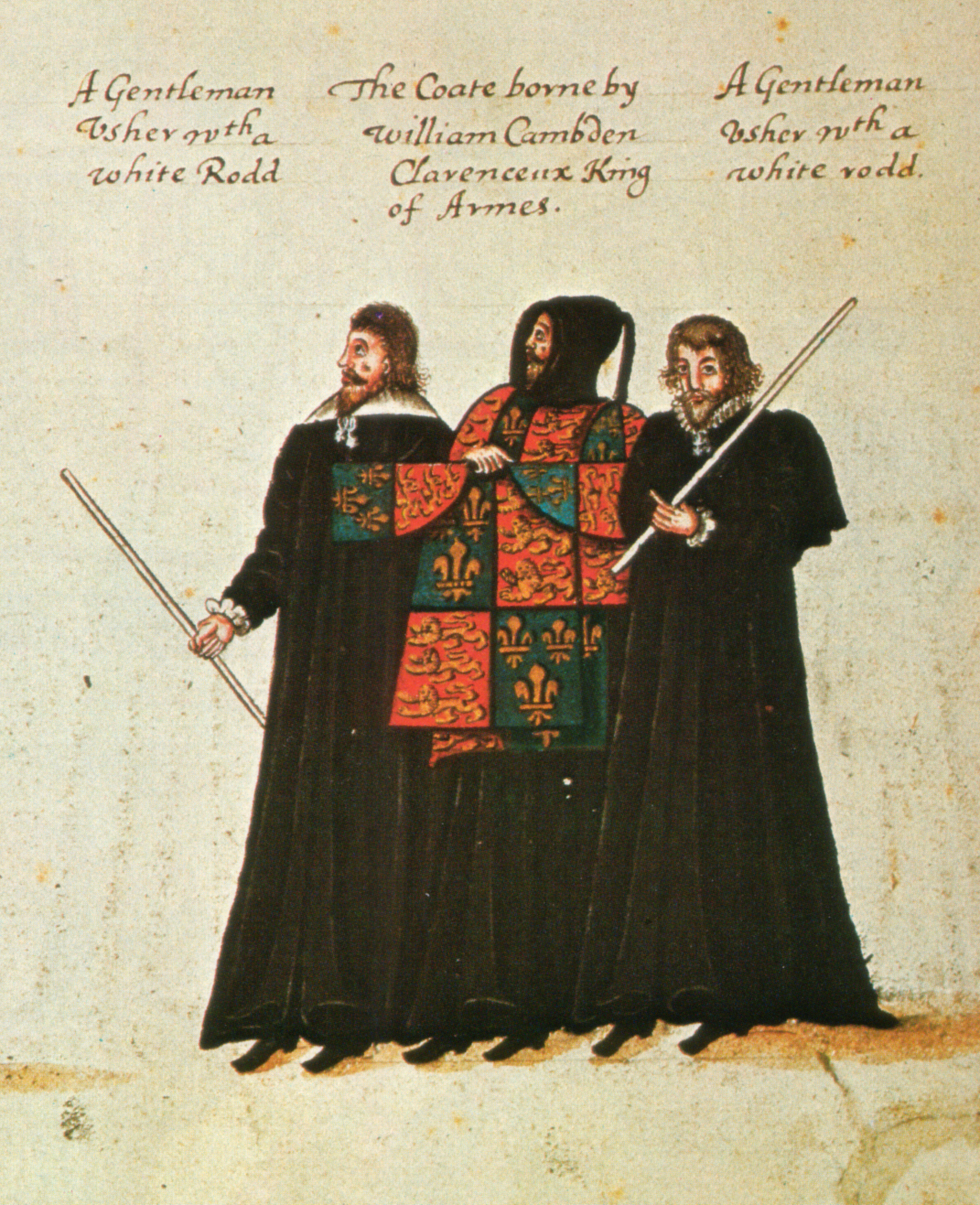
Camden at centre as Clarenceux King of Arms in the funeral procession of Queen Elizabeth I, 1603

In 1593 Camden became headmaster of Westminster School. He held the post for four years, but left when he was appointed Clarenceux King of Arms. By this time, largely because of the Britannia's reputation, he was a well-known and revered figure, and the appointment was meant to free him from the labour of teaching and to facilitate his research. The College of Arms at that time was not only a centre of genealogical and heraldic study, but also a centre of antiquarian study. The appointment, however, roused the jealousy of Ralph Brooke, York Herald, who, in retaliation, published an attack on Britannia, charging Camden with inaccuracy and plagiarism. Camden successfully defended himself against the charges in subsequent editions of the work.

Britannia was recognised as an important work of Renaissance scholarship, not only in England, but across the European "Republic of Letters". Camden considered having the 1586 Britannia printed in the Low Countries, and although that did not happen, the third edition of 1590, in addition to its London printing, was also published the same year in Frankfurt, and reprinted there in 1616. In 1612 parts were condemned by the Spanish Inquisition. An abridgement was published in Amsterdam in 1617 and reprinted in 1639; and versions of the text were also included in Joan Blaeu's Theatrum Orbis Terrarum (published in Amsterdam in 1645) and in Jan Janssonius's Novus Atlas (again published in Amsterdam, in 1646).

== Annales ==
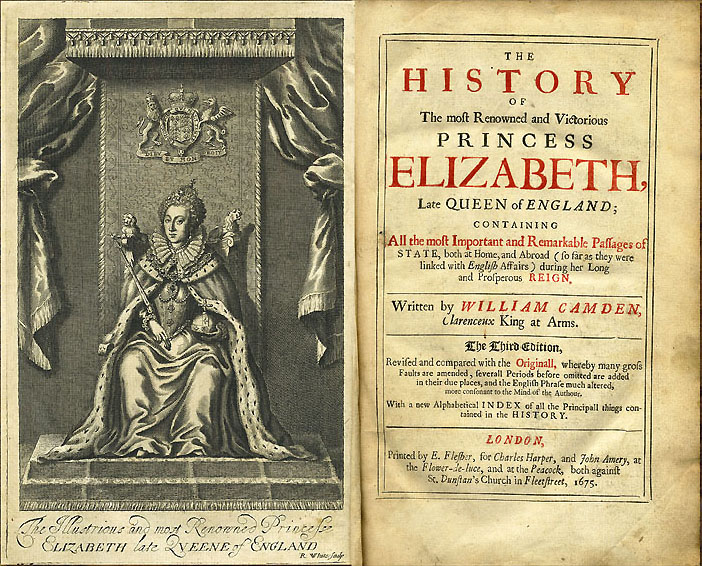
Frontispiece and title page of a 1675 edition of the Annales

In 1597, William Cecil, 1st Baron Burghley suggested that Camden write a history of Queen Elizabeth's reign. The degree of Burghley's subsequent influence on the work is unclear: Camden only specifically mentions John Fortescue of Salden, Elizabeth's last Chancellor of the Exchequer, and Henry Cuffe, Robert Devereux, 2nd Earl of Essex's secretary, as sources. Camden began his work in 1607. The first part (books 1–3) of the Annales rerum Anglicarum et Hibernicarum regnante Elizabetha, ad annum salutis M.D. LXXXIX, covering the reign up to 1588, appeared in 1615. The second part (book 4, covering 1589–1603) was completed in 1617, but was not published until 1625 (Leiden edition), and 1627 (London edition), following Camden's death. The first translation into English of books 1–3 appeared in 1625, done by Abraham Darcie or Darcy (fl. 1625). Book 4 was translated into English by Thomas Browne, canon of Windsor, in 1629.

The Annales were not written in a continuous narrative, but in the style of earlier annals, giving the events of each year in a separate entry. Sometimes criticised as being too favourably disposed towards Elizabeth and James I, the Annales are one of the great works of English historiography and had a great impact on the later image of the Elizabethan age. Hugh Trevor-Roper said about them: "It is thanks to Camden that we ascribe to Queen Elizabeth a consistent policy of via media rather than an inconsequent series of unresolved conflicts and paralysed indecisions."

Camden heavily revised and self-censored his work to favour his patron. This included pages being overwritten, or passages covered by having pieces of paper stuck on. This made censored passages on hundreds of pages unreadable. In 2023 enhanced imaging technology using transmitted light made the hidden passages readable, revealing major insights, and confirming that the Annales were deliberately rewritten to depict Elizabeth's reign in a way favourable to her successor. Amongst new revelations, the Annals reported that Elizabeth, dying, had named James VI of Scotland as her successor. Analysis of the manuscript drafts shows the deathbed scene to be a fabricated addition to support James's succession. Pope Pius V was reported to have excommunicated Elizabeth due to "secret plots"; this originally had been the more inflammatory "spiritual warfare", and had been toned down. As of July 2023 the new material was being studied, with the expectation that modern interpretations of Elizabeth and her reign would potentially change.

== Remaines Concerning Britain ==
Camden's Remaines of a Greater Worke, Concerning Britaine was a collection of themed historical essays, conceived as a more popular companion to Britannia. This was the only book Camden wrote in English, and, contrary to his own misleading description of it in the first edition (1605) as being merely the "rude rubble and out-cast rubbish" of a greater and more serious work (i.e. Britannia), manuscript evidence clearly indicates that he planned this book early on and as a quite separate project. Remaines subsequently ran into many editions. The standard modern edition, edited by R. D. Dunn, is based on the surviving manuscript material and the three editions published in Camden's lifetime (1605, 1614, and 1623). Editions published after 1623 are unreliable and contain unauthentic material, especially the bowdlerized edition of 1636 by John Philipot. Thomas Moule's edition of 1870, of which many copies survive, is based on Philipot's 1674 edition.

Camden's Remaines is often the earliest or sole usage cited for a word in the Oxford English Dictionary; and further significant early usages (including new words and antedatings) have since been identified. Remaines also contains the first-ever alphabetical list of English proverbs, since heavily exploited by the editors of the principal modern dictionaries of proverbs (including those of Burton Stevenson (1949), M. P. Tilley (1950) and the third edition of the Oxford Dictionary of English Proverbs, edited by F. P. Wilson (1970)). Scattered through the book are a number of additional proverbs not recorded elsewhere.

== Reges, reginae ==
In 1600 Camden published, anonymously, Reges, reginae, nobiles et alii in ecclesia collegiata B. Petri Westmonasterii sepulti, a guidebook to the many tomb monuments and epitaphs of Westminster Abbey. Although slight, this was a highly innovative work, predating John Weever's Ancient Funerall Monuments by over thirty years. It proved popular with the public, and two expanded editions appeared in 1603 and in 1606.

== Other writings ==
Among Camden's other works were the Institutio Graecae grammatices compendiaria in usum regiae scholae Westmonasteriensis (1595), a Greek grammar which remained a standard school textbook for over a century; Actio in Henricum Garnetum, Societatis Jesuiticae in Anglia superiorem (1607), a Latin translation of the trial of the Gunpowder Plotters, aimed at an international readership; an unpublished essay on printing; and a number of Latin poems.

== Final years ==
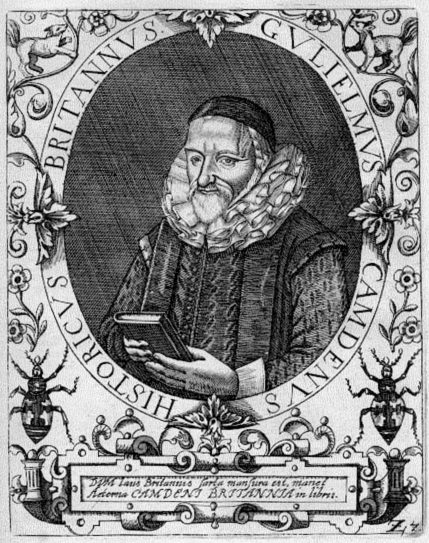
Camden (by Marcus Gheeraerts the Younger, 1609)

In 1609 Camden moved to Chislehurst in Kent, now south-east London. Though often in ill health, he continued to work diligently. In 1622 he founded an endowed lectureship in history at Oxford – the first in the world – which continues to this day as the Camden Professor of Ancient History. That same year he was struck with paralysis. He died at Chislehurst on 9 November 1623, and was buried at Westminster Abbey, where his monument, incorporating a demi-figure of Camden holding a copy of the Britannia, can still be seen in the south transept ("Poets' Corner").

Camden left his books to his former pupil and friend Sir Robert Cotton, the creator of the Cotton library. His circle of friends and acquaintances included Lord Burghley, Fulke Greville, Philip Sidney, Edmund Spenser, John Stow, John Dee, Jacques de Thou and Ben Jonson, who was Camden's student at Westminster and who dedicated an early edition of Every Man in His Humour to him.

== Legacy ==
Camden's Britannia remained a standard and highly regarded authority for many years after his death. A lightly revised edition of Holland's 1610 translation was published in 1637. A new and greatly expanded translation, edited by Edmund Gibson, was published in 1695, and was reissued in revised editions in 1722, 1753 and 1772. Yet another new and further expanded translation by Richard Gough was published in 1789, followed by a second edition in 1806. In an address given in 1986, marking the original publication's 400th anniversary, George Boon commented that the work "still fundamentally colours the way in which we, as antiquaries, look at our country".

Hitherto hidden censored passages in the Annales which became readable in 2023 may significantly change modern interpretations of Queen Elizabeth's reign.

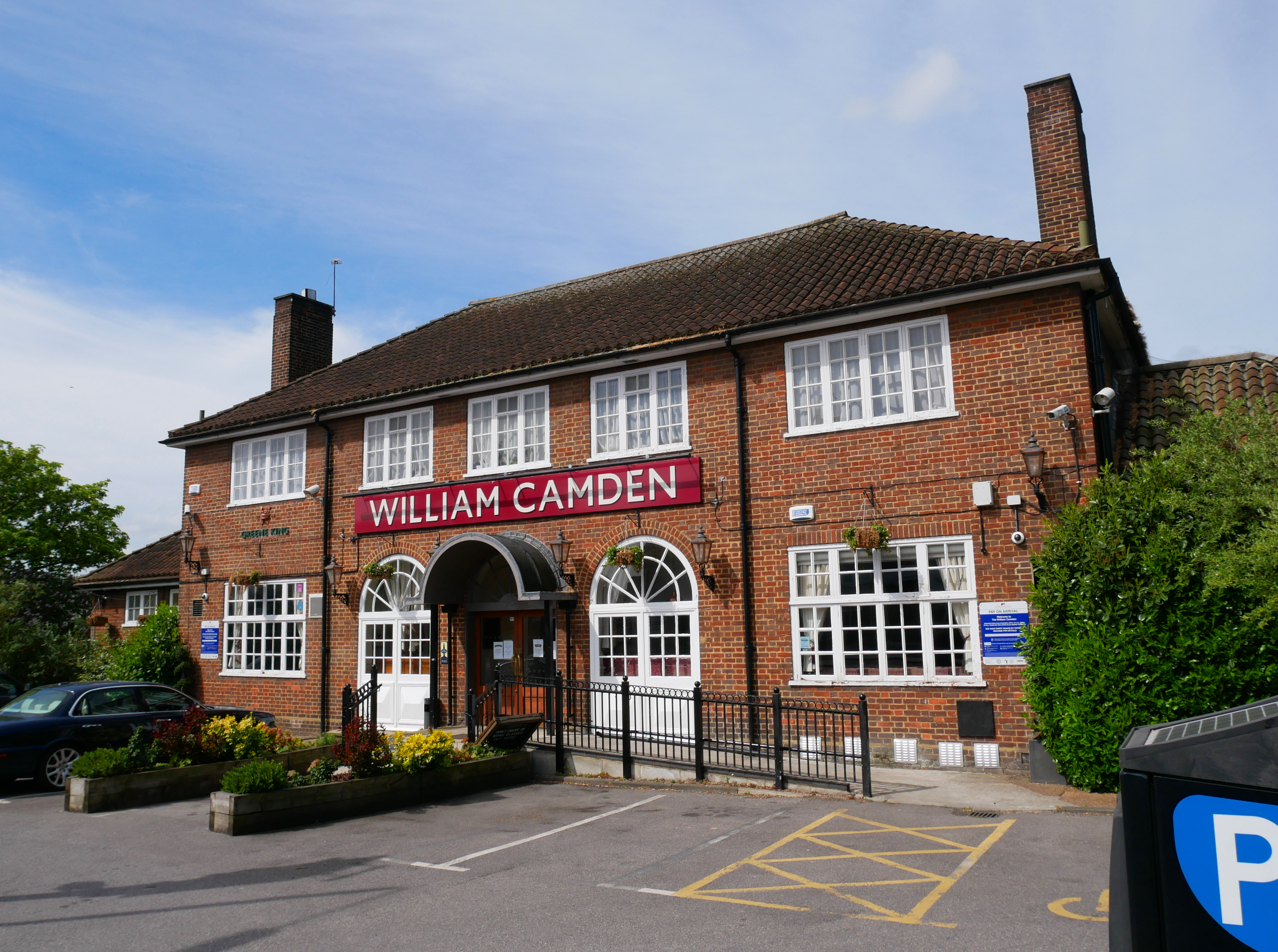
The William Camden, a pub in Bexleyheath, several miles from Chislehurst, Kent, where Camden lived in later life

The lectureship in history at Oxford endowed by Camden survives as the Camden Professor of Ancient History. Since 1877 it has been attached to Brasenose College, and since 1910 has been limited to Roman history.

The Camden Society, named after Camden, was a text publication society founded in 1838 to publish early historical and literary materials. In 1897 it was absorbed into the Royal Historical Society, which continues to publish texts in what are now known as the Camden Series.

The Cambridge Camden Society, which also took its name from Camden, was a learned society founded in 1839 by undergraduates at Cambridge University to promote the study of Gothic architecture. In 1845 it moved to London, where it became known as the Ecclesiological Society, and was highly influential in the development of the 19th-century Gothic revival.

After Camden's death, his former home at Chislehurst became known as Camden Place. In the 18th century, it was acquired by Sir Charles Pratt, Chief Justice of the Common Pleas and later Lord Chancellor, who in 1765 was elevated to the peerage with the title Baron Camden, of Camden Place. In 1786 he was created Earl Camden, and in 1812 his son became Marquess Camden. The family owned and developed land to the north of London, and so, by this circuitous route, William Camden's name survives in the names of Camden Town and the London Borough of Camden.

== Arms ==
Coat of arms of William Camden
Crest An equilateral triangle pierced or charged with 3 estoiles gules. Escutcheon Or, a fess engrailed between 6 crosses crosslet fitchy sable. Motto Pondere non Numero

== Sources ==
- Adams, Simon (2002). Leicester and the Court: Essays on Elizabethan Politics. Manchester: Manchester University Press. ISBN 0719053242.
- Boon, G. C. (1987). "Camden and the Britannia". Archaeologia Cambrensis. 136: 1–19.
- Collinson, Patrick (1998). "One of us? William Camden and the making of history". Transactions of the Royal Historical Society. 6th ser. 8: 139–63. doi:10.2307/3679292. JSTOR 3679292. S2CID 162157376.
- Copley, Gordon J. (1977). "Introduction". Camden's Britannia: Surrey and Sussex. London: Hutchinson & Co. ISBN 0091220009.
- DeMolen, R. L. (1984). "The Library of William Camden". Proceedings of the American Philosophical Society. 128: 326–409.
- Harris, Oliver D. (2015). "William Camden, Philemon Holland and the 1610 translation of Britannia". Antiquaries Journal. 95: 279–303. doi:10.1017/s0003581515000189. S2CID 163181232.
- Hepple, Leslie W. (1999). "Sir Robert Cotton, Camden's Britannia, and the early history of Roman Wall studies". Archaeologia Aeliana. 5th ser. 27: 1–19.doi:10.5284/1061018
- Herendeen, Wyman H. (2007). William Camden: a life in context. Woodbridge: Boydell & Brewer. ISBN 9781843831266.
- Herendeen, Wyman H. (2008) [2004]. "Camden, William (1551–1623)". Oxford Dictionary of National Biography (online ed.). Oxford University Press. doi:10.1093/ref:odnb/4431. (Subscription, Wikipedia Library access or UK public library membership required.)
- Jones, H. Stuart (1943). "The Foundation and History of the Camden Chair" (PDF). Oxoniensia. 8–9: 169–92. Archived (PDF) from the original on 27 July 2011.
- Kenyon, John (1983). The History Men: The Historical Profession in England since the Renaissance. London: Weidenfeld & Nicolson. ISBN 0-297-78254-1.
- Kunst, Christiane (1995). "William Camden's Britannia: history and historiography". In Crawford, M. H.; Ligota, C. R. (eds.). Ancient History and the Antiquarian: essays in memory of Arnaldo Momigliano. Warburg Institute Colloquia. Vol. 2. London: Warburg Institute. pp. 117–31. ISBN 0854810951.
- Levy, F. J. (1964). "The Making of Camden's Britannia". Bibliothèque d'humanisme et Renaissance. 26: 70–97.
- Levy, F. J. (1967). Tudor Historical Thought. San Marino: Huntington Library.
- Lucas, Peter J. (2018). "William Camden, seventeenth-century atlases of the British Isles and the printing of Anglo-Saxon". Antiquaries Journal. 98: 219–44. doi:10.1017/S000358151800015X. S2CID 165970970.
- Parry, Graham (1995). The Trophies of Time: English antiquarians of the seventeenth century. Oxford: Oxford University Press. ISBN 0198129629.
- Piggott, Stuart (1976). "William Camden and the Britannia". Ruins in a Landscape: essays in antiquarianism. Edinburgh: Edinburgh University Press. pp. 33–53. ISBN 0852243030.
- Richardson, R. C. (2004). "William Camden and the Re-Discovery of England" (PDF). Transactions of the Leicestershire Archaeological and Historical Society. 78: 108–23. Archived (PDF) from the original on 25 September 2012.
- Rockett, William (1995). "The Structural Plan of Camden's Britannia". Sixteenth Century Journal. 26 (4): 829–41. doi:10.2307/2543789. JSTOR 2543789.
- Trevor-Roper, H. R. (1971). Queen Elizabeth's First Historian: William Camden and the beginnings of English "civil history". London.
- Trevor-Roper, H. R. (14 June 1985). "William Camden: Remains Concerning Britain, edited by R. D. Dunn [review]". Times Literary Supplement: 671–2.
- Vine, Angus (2014). "Copiousness, conjecture and collaboration in William Camden's Britannia". Renaissance Studies. 28 (2): 225–41. doi:10.1111/rest.12051. S2CID 153425402.
- Woolf, D. R. (1990). The Idea of History in Early Stuart England. Toronto: University of Toronto Press. ISBN 0802058620.
