= Karl Young =

Karl Young may refer to:

- Karl Young (theatre historian) (1879–1943), professor at Yale University, theatre historian and medievalist
- Karl E. Young (1903–1990), professor at Brigham Young University and historian of Mormonism

== See also ==
- Carl Jung (1875–1961), Swiss psychiatrist and founder of analytical psychology
- Carl Young, American meteorologist of the TWISTEX tornado research experiment who died in the 2013 El Reno tornado
