= The Percy Letters =

The Percy Letters is a seven-volume book series containing the correspondances of Thomas Percy and his associates. It was generally edited by David Nichol Smith and Cleanth Brooks.
