= Ian Doyle (bibliographer) =

Anthony Ian Doyle, FBA (24 October 1925 – 4 February 2018), commonly known as Ian Doyle, was a British librarian and bibliographer. From 1958 to 1982, he was the Keeper of Rare Books at Durham University Library; he was also a reader in bibliography at Durham University from 1972 to 1985. He was elected a fellow of the British Academy in 1992 and a corresponding fellow of the Medieval Academy of America in 1991; he received the Sir Israel Gollancz Prize from the British Academy in 1983, the Chancellor's Medal from Durham University in 2010 and the Gold Medal of the Bibliographical Society in 2014.

Three festschrifts were published in his honour:

- Richard Beadle and Alan Piper: New Science Out of Old Books: Studies in Manuscripts and Early Printed Books in Honour of A. I. Doyle (London: Scholar Press, 1995);
- A. J. Minnis (ed.), Late-Medieval Religious Texts and Their Transmission: Essays in Honour of A.I. Doyle (Cambridge: D. S. Brewer, 1994);
- Corinne Saunders, Richard Lawrie and Laurie Atkinson (eds), Middle English Manuscripts and Their Legacies: A Volume in Honour of Ian Doyle, Library of the Written Word, vol. 102 (Leiden: Brill, 2021).
