= Allen Mawer =

English philologist (1879–1942)

Sir Allen Mawer FBA
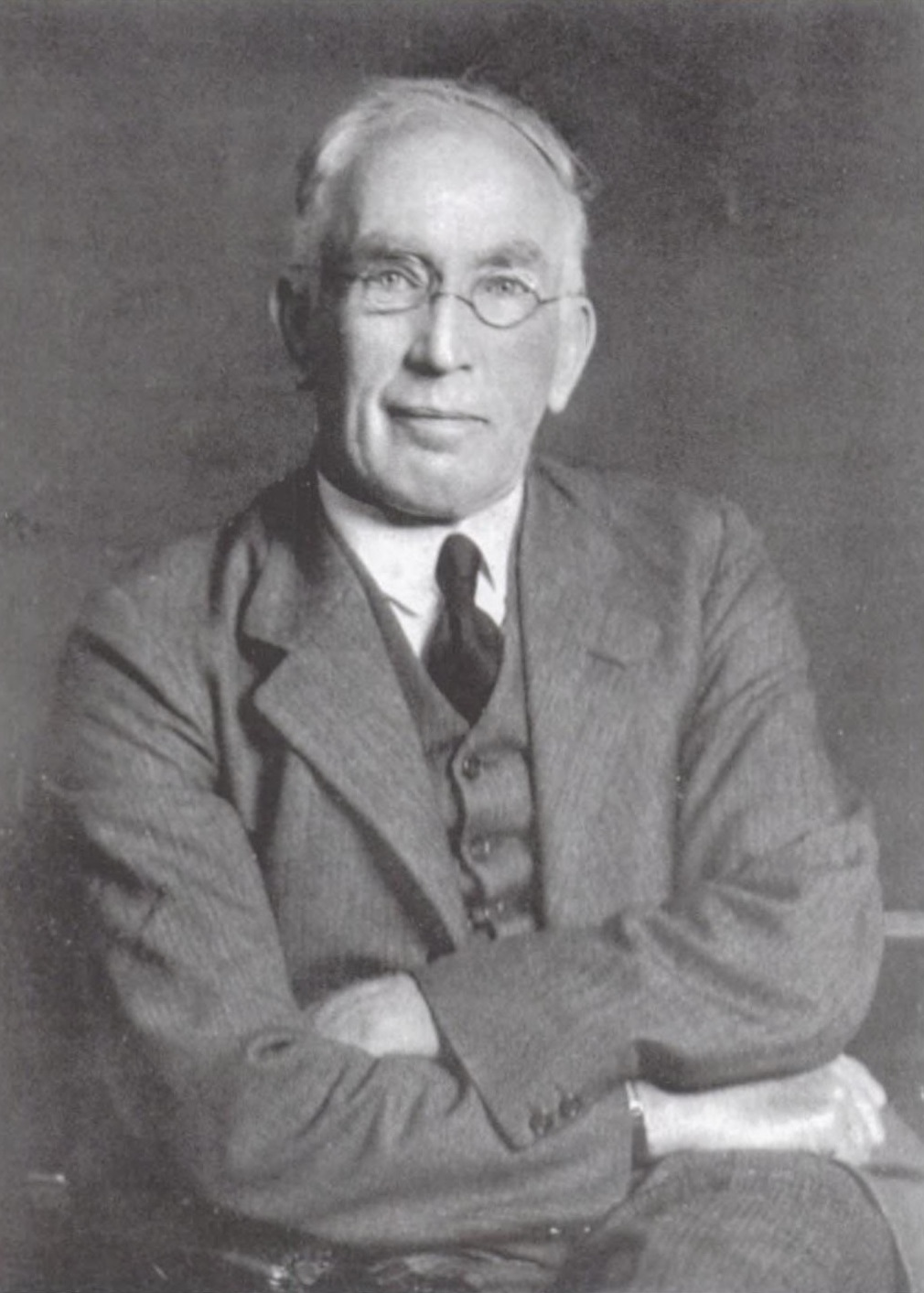
- Born: 8 May 1879; Bow, London, England
- Died: 22 July 1942 (aged 63); Broxbourne, Hertfordshire, England
- Spouse: Lettice Mona Kathleen Heath (after 1909)
- Children: 5

Academic background
- Education: Coopers' Company and Coborn School; London University; University College London; Gonville and Caius College, Cambridge
- Academic advisors: Hector Munro Chadwick; W. P. Ker

Academic work
- Discipline: Philology
- Institutions: University of Sheffield; Newcastle University; University of Liverpool; University College London
- Main interests: Viking activity in the British Isles; Toponymy of England
- Notable works: The Vikings (1913); Place-Names of Northumberland and Durham (1920)

Sir Allen Mawer, FBA (8 May 1879 − 22 July 1942) was an English philologist. A notable researcher of Viking activity in the British Isles, Mawer is best known as the founder of the English Place-Name Society, and as Provost of University College London from 1929 to 1942.

== Early life ==
Allen Mawer was born at Bow, London, on 8 May 1879. He was born the second child and eldest son of five children, to George Henry Mawer of South Hackney and Clara Isabella Allen. His father was a commercial traveller in fancy trimmings and secretary of the Country Towns' Mission.

Mawer's parents were of strong religious feeling who valued education. Through them, he acquired an abiding love for literature and history, and early knowledge of Greek and Latin.

== Education ==
Mawer entered Coopers' Company Grammar School at the age of ten, where he won a scholarship at the end of his first term. In 1897 he sat as an external candidate for an Honours Degree in English at London University, obtaining a First Class in his examination. Mawer entered University College London in 1898 as a graduate, where he was the Morley Medallist. At University College London, Professor W. P. Ker had a particularly strong influence on him.

Mawer entered Gonville and Caius College, Cambridge, in October 1901 as a foundation scholar, residing there for three years, obtaining a double mark of distinction in the English sections of the Medieval and Modern Languages Tripos. Supported by a Research Studentship given to him by the college, he spent the next year studying Viking activity in England, in particular the subject of Old Norse place-names.

== Early career ==
In October 1905, Mawer was appointed Lecturer in English at the University of Sheffield. A few weeks later, after having his thesis on this subject examined by experts, he was elected to a fellowship by Gonville and Caius College, which he held until 1911.

In 1908 he was elected to the Joseph Cowen Professorship of Language and Literature in Armstrong College, Newcastle, where he would remain for thirteen years. During his years at Armstrong College, Mawer continued his research on Viking influence and Old Norse place-names in England. In 1913, he published his celebrated The Vikings, which for many years served as the standard English-language work on Vikings. By this time, Mawer had become convinced that the place-names of England contained the key to understanding the extent of Scandinavian influence in medieval England. The same year as his publishing of The Vikings, he also published two papers on Scandinavian place-names in England.

The year 1920 saw the publishing of his Place-Names of Northumberland and Durham, which was the product of eight years of research. It established him as one of the major experts in this field of study. In the preface to this work, Mawer laid down his principle that "no single county can be dealt with satisfactorily apart from a survey of the field of English place-nomenclature as a whole".

== Founding the English Place-Name Society ==
In 1921, Mawer became Baines Professor of the English Language at the University of Liverpool, succeeding Henry Cecil Kennedy Wyld. The Scandinavian countries had by this time conducted systematic surveys of their place-names, and English scholars were to do the same for their country. By then it had become obvious that Mawer was the right scholar to take the lead. Following a speech made to the British Academy in January 1921, the academy sponsored the creation of the English Place-Name Society, of which Mawer was Honorary Director and Secretary, and the driving force. Under the leadership of Mawer, the Society began the gigantic undertaking of producing the Survey of English Place-Names. Drawing upon large support from the English public, the Society gained many members and plenty of funds, and its Survey came to be conducted by several scholars, including Eilert Ekwall, Frank Stenton, Percy Hide Reany, Albert Hugh Smith, John Eric Bruce Gover and Mawer himself. Four of the eight volumes of the Survey produced during Mawer's lifetime were authored by him. The first volume, Introduction to the Survey of English Place-Names (1924), was written with Stenton, while the second volume, Chief Elements used in English Place-Names (1924), Mawer wrote by himself.

Mawer was awarded the Biennial Prize for English Studies of the British Academy in 1929 in recognition of his work for the Society. During this time, he also authored two chapters on early Scandinavian history for the Cambridge Medieval History (Vol. III, 1922), and the article "The Redemption of the Five Boroughs", which was published in the English Historical Review in 1923. In the latter article, which has been described as his most important work on history, Mawer convincingly argued that the ethnic distinction between Danes and Norwegians was a significant political factor in tenth-century England. His Place-Names and History (1922) and Problems of Place-Name Study (1929) gained a wide circulation.

== Provost at University College London ==
In 1929, Mawer was elected provost of University College London. One of the best-known scholars of his generation, he was elected a fellow of the British Academy in 1930 and received the honour of knighthood in 1937. He was awarded an honorary DCL from Durham University in 1937. Mawer was an honorary foreign member of the Royal Flemish Academy.

Combined with his responsibilities at University College London, Mawer served as president of the Modern Language Association from 1929 to 1939, president of the Philological Society in 1936, and vice-president of the Viking Society. He was a contributor to the Encyclopædia Britannica on articles about Anglo-Saxon and Scandinavian subjects.

With the outbreak of World War II, the college was dispersed to various parts of England and Wales. Although a man of great physical energy, Mawer suffered from an irregular heart. His strenuous efforts to hold the college together during wartime took a heavy toll on Mawer's health, and on 22 July 1942 he collapsed and died suddenly on a train in Broxbourne while on his way to a meeting of a committee in London.

== Personal life ==
Mawer married Lettice Mona Kathleen Heath on 8 July 1909. She was the daughter of the Rev. Christopher Heath of Wellesley Court, Cheltenham, who was Vicar of Hucclecote, Gloucestershire. The couple had four daughters, and a son who died in infancy.

== Selected works ==
- The Vikings, 1913
- Place-Names of Northumberland and Durham (1920)
- Place-Names and History, 1922
- (With Frank Stenton) Introduction to the Survey of English Place-Names, 1924
- Chief Elements used in English Place-Names, 1924
- Problems of Place-Name Study, 1929

== Sources ==
- Ekwall, E. (1942). "Notes and News: Sir Allen Mawer: In Memoriam". English Studies. 24: 169–171. doi:10.1080/00138384208596736.
- Ekwall, E. (23 September 2004). "Mawer, Sir Allen". Oxford Dictionary of National Biography (online ed.). Oxford University Press. doi:10.1093/ref:odnb/34952. (Subscription, Wikipedia Library access or UK public library membership required.)
- Stenton, F. M. (1943). "Sir Allen Mawer". In Lapidge, Michael (ed.). Interpreters of Early Medieval Britain. British Academy. pp. 237–243. ISBN 9780197262771.
- "Sir Allen Mawer". The Times. 23 July 1942. p. 7.

Academic offices
Preceded by Gregory Foster	Provost of University College London; 1929–1942	Succeeded by David Randall Pye
