= Joan Weiner =

American philosopher

Joan Weiner is an American philosopher and professor emerita of philosophy at Indiana University Bloomington, known for her books on Gottlob Frege.

== Education and career ==
Weiner majored in mathematics at the University of Michigan, graduating with high distinction and honors in 1975. She completed a Ph.D. in philosophy at Harvard University in 1982.

She became an assistant professor of philosophy at the University of Wisconsin–Milwaukee in 1981, with terms as a visiting faculty member at the University of Pennsylvania and a postdoctoral researcher at the University of Pittsburgh. She was promoted to associate professor at the University of Wisconsin-Milwaukee in 1988 and full professor in 1997, while also earning a master's degree in biostatistics from the Medical College of Wisconsin in 1993. In 2002 she moved to Indiana University Bloomington, and in 2019 she retired as a professor emerita.

Weiner was named a Guggenheim Fellow in 2000.

== Books ==
Weiner is the author of:

- Frege in Perspective (Cornell University Press, 1990)
- Frege (Past Masters, Oxford University Press, 1999), revised and expanded as Frege Explained: From Arithmetic To Analytic Philosophy (Open Court Press, 2004)
- Taking Frege At His Word (Oxford University Press, 2020)
