= Kings Weston Roman Villa =

Ruins of a Roman villa in Bristol, England

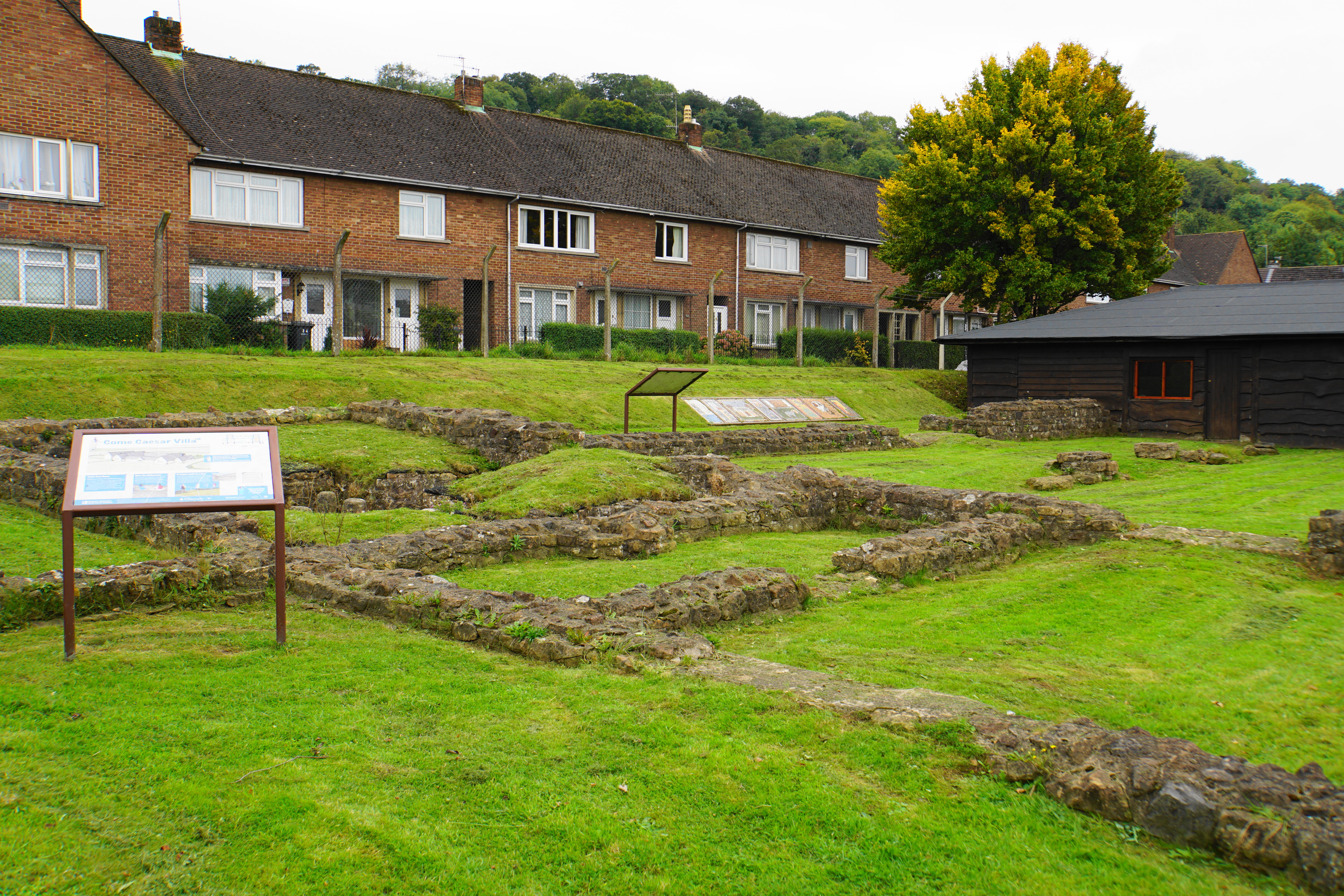
- The site of the villa in 2017
- Established: 1947
- Location: Long Cross, Lawrence Weston, Bristol BS11 0LP, England
- Coordinates: 51.4950°N 2.6727°W
- Type: Roman villa
- Owner: Bristol Museum & Art Gallery
- Public transit access: Bus
- Website: Kings Weston Roman Villa

Scheduled monument
- Official name: Part of a minor Romano-British villa at Long Cross
- Designated: 29 February 1960
- Reference no.: 1006999

Kings Weston Roman Villa is located in Lawrence Weston in the north-west of Bristol (grid reference ST533775). Discovered in 1947 during the construction of the post-war housing estate, the site consists of two distinct buildings: a fully excavated eastern building and a partially explored western building located beneath the modern Long Cross road.

The ruins of the Roman villa are a Scheduled Monument that represents a winged corridor design common in Roman Britain. It is notable for retaining original mosaic floors, a hypocaust system, and the only Roman bath suite visible in Bristol. Finds from the site, including coinage, jewellery, and human remains, are held by the Bristol Museum & Art Gallery.

== History ==
=== Roman settlement ===
The villa was situated within a broader landscape of Roman agricultural settlement in the area. Evidence suggests the villa operated as the centre of a farming estate, likely capitalising on the salt marsh flats of the River Avon for cattle grazing, while cereal crops were cultivated on higher ground. The villa was located near the Roman road network and the port town of Abonae (modern Sea Mills), which served as a supply base and trading centre for the region, linking to Gloucester and Bath.

The villa did not exist in isolation; excavations at nearby St Bede's Catholic College in 1982 revealed a Romano-British farmstead established in the 1st century AD, roughly 400 metres (1,300 ft) northeast of the villa. This spacing of approximately 400 to 500 metres (1,300 to 1,600 ft) between sites, including another potential settlement at Saltmarsh Drive, suggests a densely occupied agricultural landscape overlooking the alluvial flats. The villa likely functioned as the centre of a large estate, with the western building containing a T-shaped corn dryer to process cereal crops grown on the surrounding high ground.

Coinage and structural evidence indicate the eastern building was likely constructed in the late 3rd century AD, specifically after AD 268–270. The site underwent several phases of remodelling. In the early 4th century (Secondary Period A), the porticus (colonnade) was rebuilt, likely due to subsidence, replacing original columns with an arcade on pedestals. By the mid-4th century, the bath suite was expanded, and a hypocaust was inserted into one of the eastern wing rooms (Room XI). A final phase involved the addition of an unfinished room to the bath suite, possibly intended as a latrine or cold bath. The construction of the villa in the late 3rd century coincides with a period of economic prosperity in the region, possibly stimulated by the policies of the Carausian regime (AD 286–296), which saw a restoration of confidence and the establishment of new rural estates across the south-west.

=== Decline and later use ===
Numismatic evidence, including coins of the Valentinian and Gratian periods (up to AD 381), suggests occupation continued into the late 4th century. The porticus appears to have collapsed before the final abandonment, with evidence of squatting of the site continuing in the ruined shell of the building. A hearth found in the porticus area suggests industrial activity or heating during this later phase. It has also been suggested that the construction of a rubble platform over the porticus may represent a "ritualised response" to the site, wherein Roman architectural elements were repurposed for new social or religious functions in the post-Roman period.

=== Discovery and excavation ===
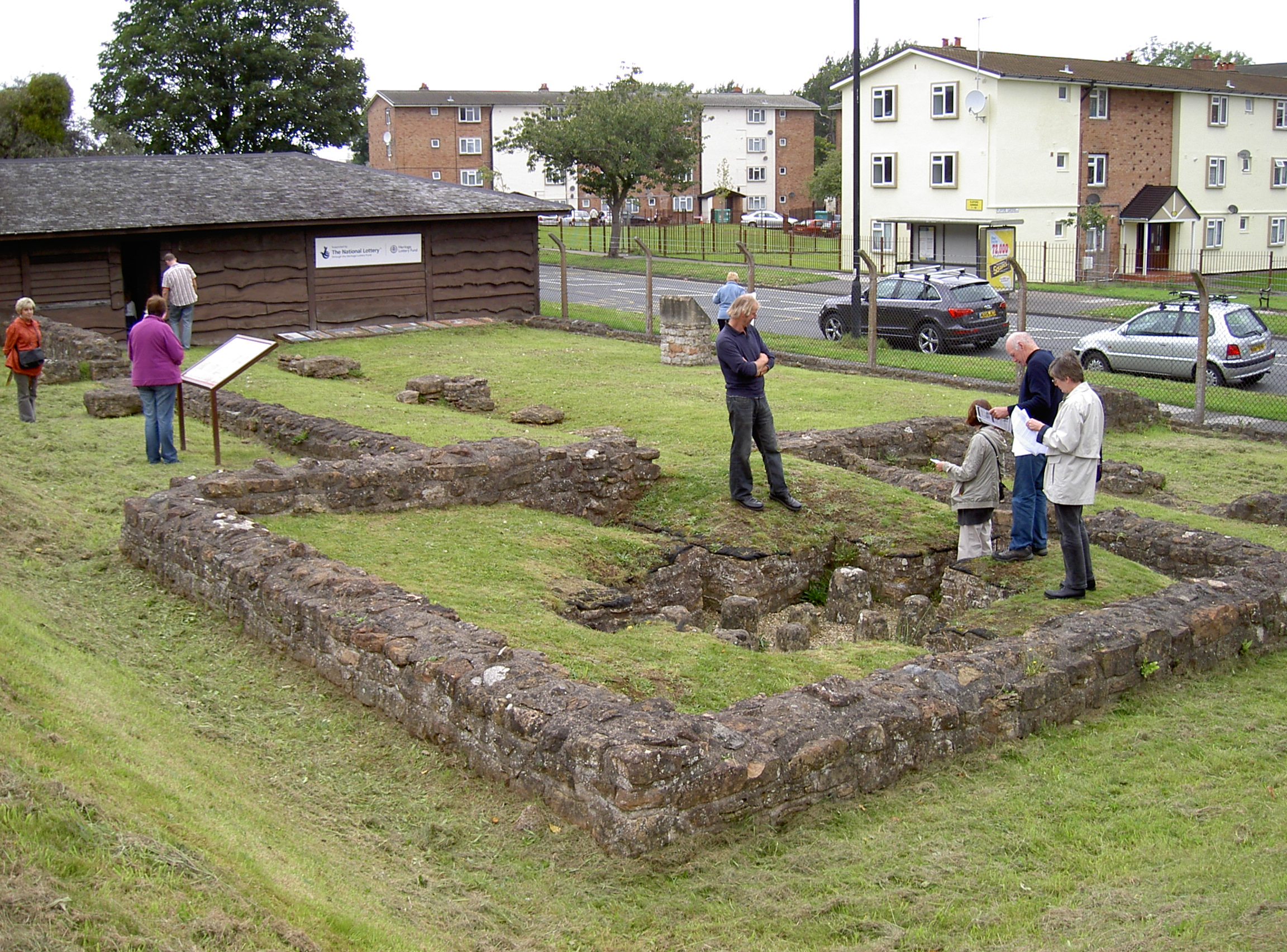
View of the site, facing northwest, with the estate's post-war housing nearby

The villa was rediscovered in November 1947 during the post-war construction of the Lawrence Weston housing estate. The site was identified when roadworks for the new Long Cross road inadvertently cut through the northern section of the complex.

Excavations began on 23 March 1948 under the direction of George C. Boon, a Latin student at the University of Bristol, and John Clevedon Brown. The operation was described in the press as a "race against time," with a team of twenty volunteers, including local schoolchildren and members of the Clevedon & District Archaeological Society, working to uncover the remains before building work resumed. The City Engineer noted they were working "from dawn to dusk" to clear the site, with the documented times of the excavation being 6 PM till dark on weekdays and 10 AM till dark on weekends.

The discovery generated significant civic interest regarding the conflict between heritage preservation and the urgent need for post-war housing. In April 1948, the Lord Mayor of Bristol, Alderman Charles Gill, visited the site alongside the City Architect J. Nelson Meredith and museum officials. At the time, six houses were planned to be built directly over the villa ruins. Following a report by Bryan O'Neil, the Chief Inspector of Ancient Monuments, who compared the site's significance to the Chedworth Roman Villa, the Bristol Housing Committee granted an initial three-month reprieve for archaeological investigation.

In May 1948, the Housing Committee formally halted the construction of ten proposed houses in the immediate vicinity to allow for further study. A permanent preservation plan was approved by Bristol City Council in 25 January 1949, which involved "topping" the walls and erecting the shelter over the pavements, while the housing estate layout was redesigned to set the new homes back from the ancient site. The Bristol Museum Committee took formal responsibility for the site, continuing a tradition of civic involvement in local archaeology that dated back to the excavation of the Brislington Roman Villa in 1899. To aid public understanding of the ruins, a detailed scale model of the villa was constructed in 1949 by artist F. R. Smith for use in Boon's lectures.

=== Later investigations ===
In 1995, Bristol and Region Archaeological Services (BaRAS), then operating as a field unit within Bristol Museum & Art Gallery, conducted a survey and limited excavation to assess the condition of the hypocaust in Room XI. The survey revealed that the flue walls of the hypocaust were in poor condition and much of the original mortar eroded. Moreover, a test pit excavated near the southern end of the protective building found no surviving archaeological features in that specific area. The unit continued to undertake fieldwork in the region until it was decommissioned in 2016.

Further geophysical surveys have been proposed to investigate the unexcavated areas to the west of the scheduled monument, aiming to identify potential ancillary buildings or boundary walls associated with the villa estate.

== Architecture ==
The extant remains belong primarily to the eastern building, a single-story winged corridor villa built into a slope. The structure was largely symmetrical, featuring a central open courtyard surrounded by wings to the east and west, and a transverse corridor (porticus) connecting them. The walls were constructed of Carboniferous Limestone foundations with a superstructure of calcareous sandstone, rendered externally with white stucco.

Archaeological analysis identifies several distinct phases of construction. The primary villa was established during Period One (AD 268–270), featuring two wings connected by an open colonnaded porticus and a central court. Around AD 300 (Period Two A), the porticus underwent a significant rebuild, likely necessitated by subsidence caused by an underlying ditch. During this reconstruction, the original Tuscan columns were replaced by an arcade of arches supported on stone pedestals.

Further alterations occurred in Period Two B (AD 300–340), including the insertion of a hypocaust into Room XI of the East Wing using monolithic pilae and the expansion of the bath suite. A final phase, Period Three (AD 337–378), saw the beginning of a further extension to the bath suite, though this appears never to have been completed.

The roof was tiled with heavy, hexagonal slabs of Pennant sandstone, capped with Bath stone ridges and finials. Research into the structural load of the roof suggests that the internal valleys required complex lead guttering to prevent water pooling between the porticus and the wings. The layout of the building, dominated by a large hall, relatively common in Britain and Germany, led to the hypotheses by archaeologist J. T. Smith that this type of building was used by an extended family group rather than a nuclear family.

== Archaeological findings ==
=== Mosaics ===
The villa contains two in situ 4th-century mosaics. The West Wing (Room VII) features a geometric mosaic composed of over 115,000 tesserae. Its design includes a central square with five circular patterns and a depiction of a large two-handled krater. This mosaic has been described by curators as "provincial" in style, likely executed by local craftsmen rather than those from Rome, evidenced by minor errors in the geometric patterns. Specific design faults include the shading on the wine cup falling from the right rather than the conventional left, and a disruption in the alternating red and yellow colour scheme of the interwoven circles.

A second mosaic is located in the frigidarium of the bath suite, displaying a pattern of interlacing curved lines in red, blue, and white. Additionally, a mosaic recovered from the nearby Brislington Roman Villa is displayed on the site within the modern cover building.

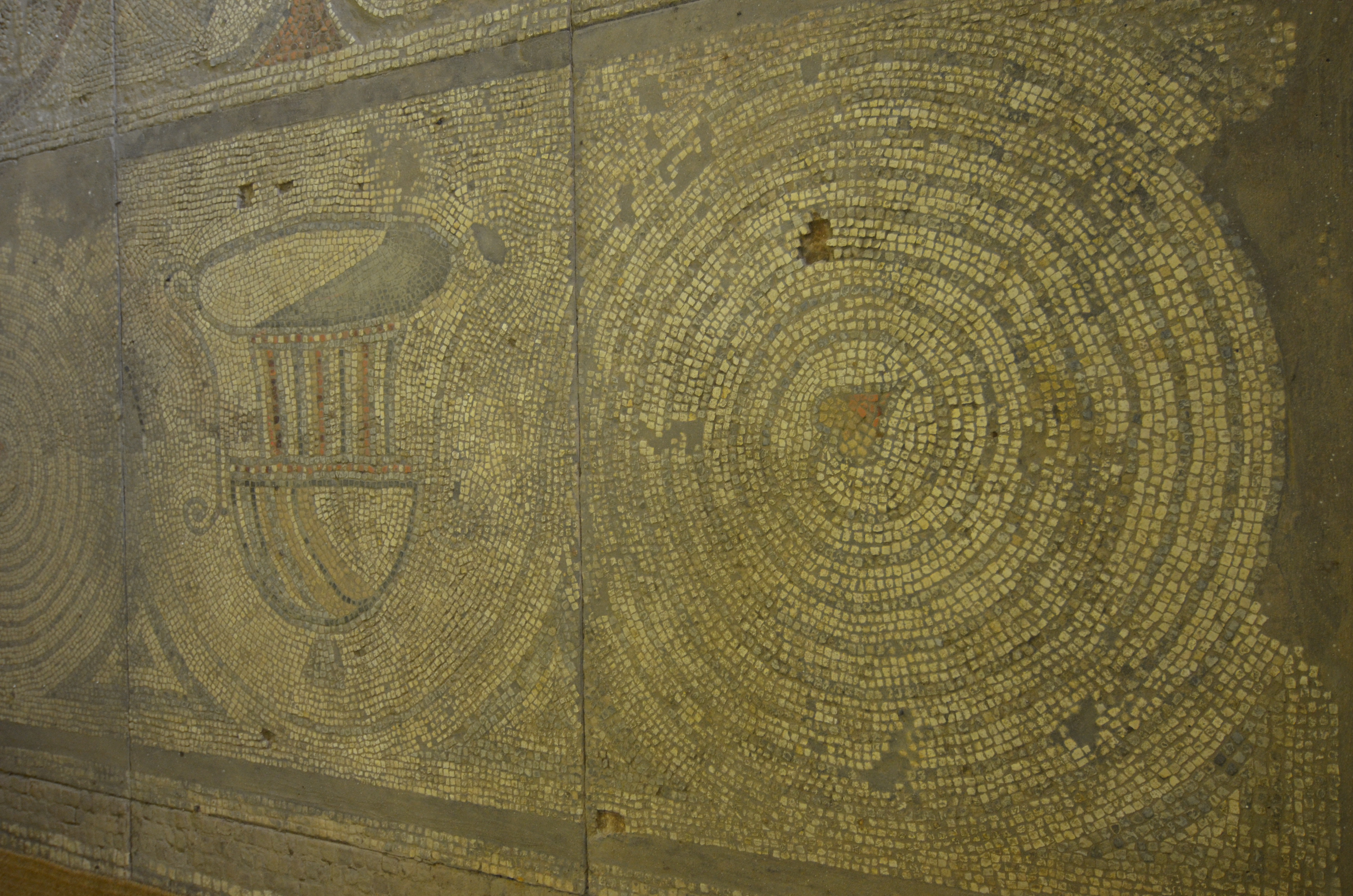

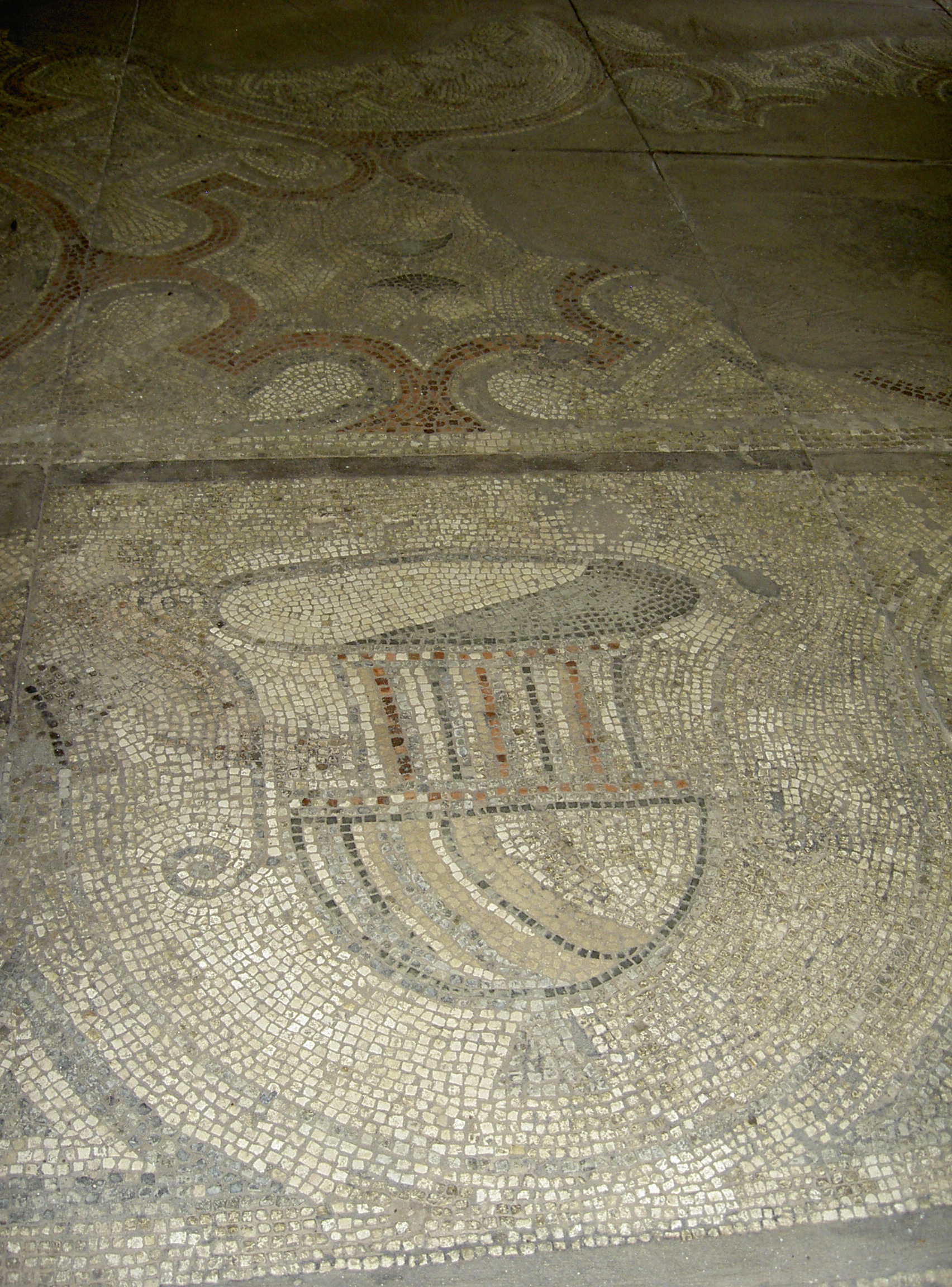

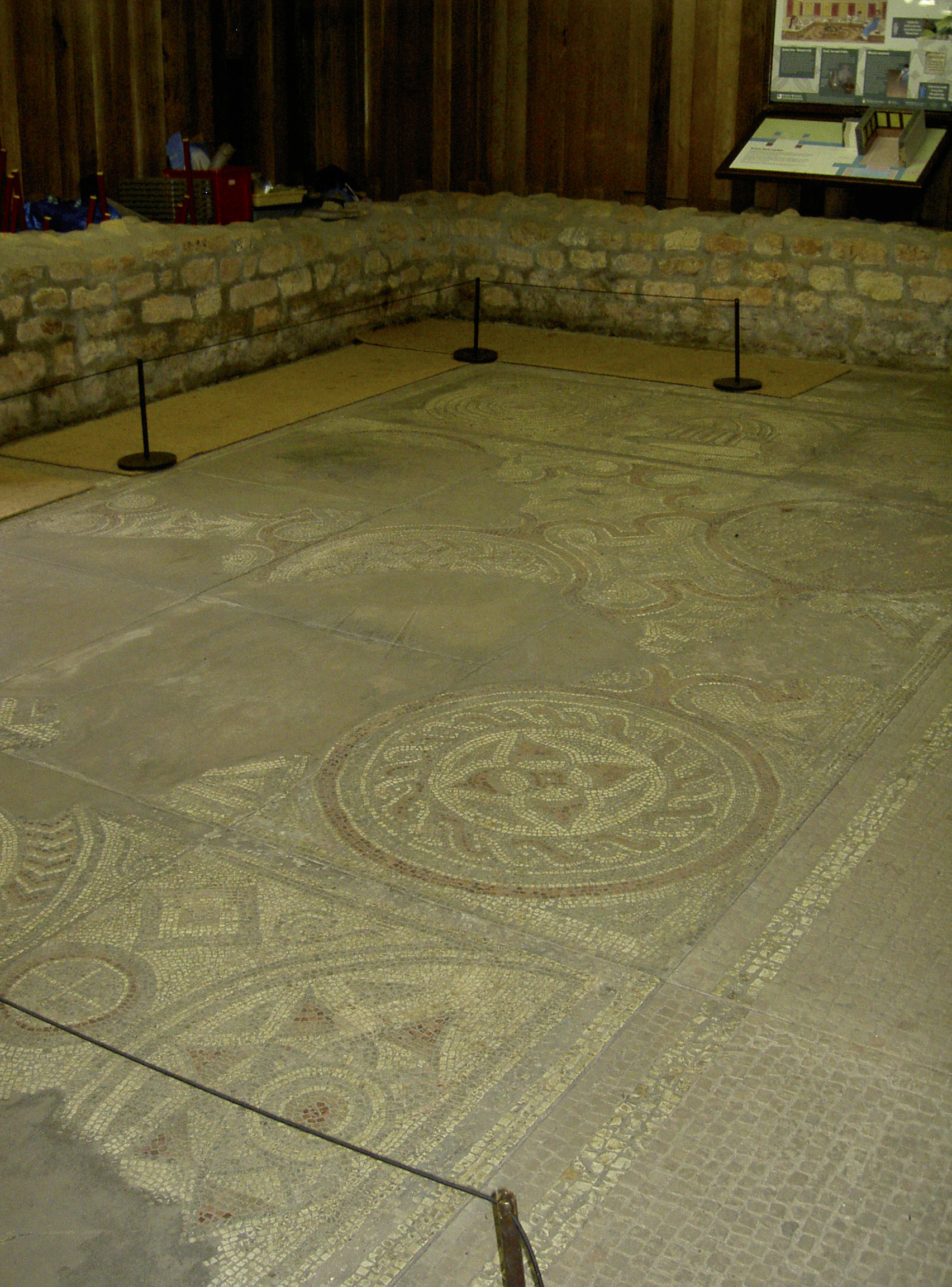

=== Human remains ===
During the excavation of the eastern building in 1948, the skeleton of a man, aged approximately fifty and standing 5 feet (1.5 m) tall, was discovered in the hypocaust of Room XI. Contemporary press reports described the discovery of a "British slave girl" in a crouching position, though later analysis confirmed the remains were male. The man had suffered violent injuries, including sword or axe cuts to the skull. George Boon originally suggested the man died during a raid in the late 4th or early 5th century. In a 1993 re-evaluation, Boon suggested the injury was consistent with Viking-era weaponry, potentially placing the death in the 9th or 10th century. Excavations in the eastern courtyard revealed the shattered upper portion of a human skeleton; the remainder of the body had been destroyed by a contractor's mechanical trench during the estate's construction.

=== Coins and other finds ===
A hoard of six copper alloy coins dating to the reign of Constantine the Great (AD 330–337) was found in the rubble overlying the changing room (Room IV). These coins, which were unworn, suggest they were lost or hidden around AD 340, providing a terminus ante quem for the use of that room. Other finds included iron collars for joining wooden water pipes, evidence of metalworking, and a foundation burial of a young pig near the main entrance. This practice of placing animal deposits at gateways has been linked to indigenous Iron Age ritual traditions that persisted into the Roman period.

== Conservation ==
In 1984, a new protective cover building was erected over the bath suite and mosaics. The roof was constructed using red cedar imported from Canada, chosen for its durability without requiring additional treatment. The site continues to host public events, including open days that aim to educate visitors on Roman history in Bristol and the rest of Britain. Since the 1980s, the museum's curatorial team has been responsible for the long-term care of its archives of finds from the site, which serve as a resource for ongoing research.

In October 2024, a vehicle crashed into the protective wooden building of the villa, embedding itself within the structure. The site was temporarily closed while Historic England and Bristol City Council assessed the structural damage to the Roman remains. Repairs were completed the following year, with the site reopening to the public in June 2025.

A 20-metre mural was painted on Long Cross near the villa in 2024, depicting an encounter between a Roman soldier and a member of the indigenous Dobunni tribe.
