= Florence Harmer =

English historian

Florence Elizabeth Harmer FBA (14 May 1890 – 5 August 1967) was an English historian, specializing in the Anglo-Saxon period. Translating from Old English and Latin, she edited a number of primary sources for early English history, and her Anglo-Saxon Writs (1952) remains a standard text.

== Life ==
Born at Mitcham, then in Surrey, Harmer was the daughter of Horace Alfred Harmer, an exporter of goods to Southern Africa, by his marriage to Harriett Frances Butler. She was educated at the City of London School for Girls, from where she gained a scholarship to Girton College, Cambridge and prepared for the Medieval and Modern Languages Tripos; she completed Section B of the tripos (the forerunner to the Anglo-Saxon, Norse and Celtic tripos) in 1912 in the first class.

From 1920 until 1957 Harmer was an academic of the University of Manchester, becoming a Senior Lecturer in 1949 and a Reader in 1955. She was described by Simon Keynes and Alfred Smyth as "the formidable Anglo-Saxonist, Florence Harmer". After she retired in 1957, she lived at Pinner, near a sister, continuing to attend meetings of the British Academy, of which she was a Fellow, and events at Cambridge. She was a friend of Dorothy Whitelock, who wrote her obituary after she died in 1967.

== Selected publications ==
- Select English Historical Documents of the Ninth and Tenth Centuries (Cambridge University Press, 1914)
- An Anglo-Saxon Chronicle from British Museum Cotton MS, Tiberius B. IV. (1926)
- 'The English contribution to the epistolary usages of the early Scandinavian kings', in Saga-Book (1949-1950)
- 'Chipping and Market, a lexicographical investigation' in Cyril Fox, ed., The Early Cultures of North West Europe (1950)
- Anglo-Saxon Writs (Manchester University Press, 1952)
- 'A Bromfield and a Coventry Writ of King Edward the Confessor', in Peter Clemoes, ed., The Anglo-Saxons: studies in some aspects of their history and culture (1959)

== Honours ==
- President, Viking Society for Northern Research, 1949
- Doctor of Letters, University of Cambridge, 1953
- Fellow of the British Academy, 1955
- Sir Israel Gollancz Prize, 1957
- Honorary Fellow of Girton College, Cambridge, 1957
- Hon. D. Litt, University of Manchester, 1964
