= Merton Professors =

Oxford professorships

There are two Merton Professorships of English in the University of Oxford: the Merton Professor of English Language and Literature, and the Merton Professor of English Literature. The second was created in 1914 when Sir Walter Raleigh's chair was renamed. At the present day both professorships are associated with Merton College, but Dame Helen Gardner held her post in association with Lady Margaret Hall. The occupants of the chairs have been:

Merton Professor of English Language and Literature

- 1885–1916: Arthur S. Napier
- 1916–1920: vacant
- 1920–1945: H. C. K. Wyld
- 1945–1959: J. R. R. Tolkien
- 1959–1980: Norman Davis
- 1980–1984: vacant
- 1984–2014: Suzanne Romaine
- 2018 onwards: Helen Small

Merton Professor of English Literature

- 1904–1922: Walter Raleigh
- 1922–1928: George Stuart Gordon
- 1929–1946: David Nichol Smith
- 1947–1957: F. P. Wilson
- 1957–1966: Nevill Coghill
- 1966–1975: Helen Gardner
- 1975–2002: John Carey
- 2002–2014: David Norbrook
- 2016–present: Lorna Hutson

== Sources ==
- Oxford Dictionary of National Biography.
- The Times.
