= Michael Carrithers =

Michael Barnes Carrithers, FBA (born 1945) is an anthropologist and academic. Since 1992, he has been Professor of Anthropology at Durham University.

== Career ==
Born in 1945, Michael Barnes Carrithers graduated from Wesleyan University in 1967 with a Bachelor of Arts degree, and went on to complete a Master of Arts degree there four years later. He was awarded a doctorate by the University of Oxford in 1978 for his thesis entitled "The forest-dwelling monks of Lanka: an historical and anthropological study". After lecturing at the London School of Economics and Oxford, he joined the staff at Durham University in 1982 as a lecturer in anthropology; he was promoted to senior lecturer in 1987, reader in 1989 and professor of anthropology in 1992.

According to his British Academy profile, Carrithers's research focuses on "The Buddha and Buddhism in Sri Lanka; Jains in India; German commemoration of the Twentieth Century; reasoning and cogency in anthropology; rhetoric culture theory; [and] ethnography as a source of philosophy".

== Awards and honours ==
In 2015, Carrithers was elected a Fellow of the British Academy, the United Kingdom's national academy for the humanities and social sciences.

== Selected publications ==
- The Forest Monks of Sri Lanka: An Anthropological and Historical Study (Oxford University Press, 1983).
- The Buddha, Past Masters series (Oxford University Press, 1983).
- (Co-edited with Steven Collins and Steven Lukes) The Category of the Person: Anthropology, Philosophy, History (Cambridge University Press, 1985).
- Founders of Faith (Oxford University Press, 1986).
- (Co-edited with Caroline Humphrey) The Assembly of Listeners: Jains in Society (Cambridge University Press, 1991).
- Why Humans have Cultures: Explaining Anthropology and Social Diversity (Oxford University Press, 1992).
- The Buddha: A Very Short Introduction (Oxford University Press, 2001).
- (Editor) Culture, Rhetoric and the Vicissitudes of Life, vol. 2, Studies in Rhetoric and Culture series (Berghahn Books, 2009).
