= Past Masters (book series) =

Oxford University Press book series

Dante by George Holmes, 1980.

Past Masters is an Oxford University Press book series published from 1980. Directly inspired by Isaiah Berlin's approach to the history of ideas, the series was created by Henry Hardy in 1980, with Keith Thomas as General Editor. Its aim was to provide a brief, lively introduction to the ideas and beliefs of important thinkers from the past who have influenced the way we think today. In 1995 it was expanded to form the Very Short Introductions series, in which a number of Past Masters were subsequently republished.

== Publication history ==
Note: This list may not be complete. ISBNs given refer mainly to the paperback editions.

=== 1980s ===
- Aquinas, A. J. P. Kenny, 1980. ISBN 9780192875006
- Burke, C. B. Macpherson, 1980. ISBN 9780192875181
- Dante, George Holmes, 1980. ISBN 9780192875044
- Francis Bacon, Anthony Quinton, 1980. ISBN 9780192875242
- Galileo, Stillman Drake, 1980. ISBN 0192875264*
- Homer, Jasper Griffin, 1980. ISBN 9780192875327
- Hume, A. J. Ayer, 1980. ISBN 9780192875280
- Jesus, Humphrey Carpenter, 1980. ISBN 9780192830166
- Marx, Peter Singer, 1980.
- Pascal, A. J. Krailsheimer, 1980. ISBN 9780192875129
- Confucius, Raymond Dawson, 1981. ISBN 9780192875365
- Engels, Terrell Carver, 1981.*
- Machiavelli, Quentin Skinner, 1981. ISBN 9780192875174 *
- Montaigne, Peter Burke, 1981. ISBN 9780192875228
- Aristotle, Jonathan Barnes, 1982.
- Berkeley, J. O. Urmson, 1982. ISBN 9780192875464
- Carlyle, A. L. Le Quesne, 1982. ISBN 9780192875624
- Coleridge, Richard Holmes, 1982 ISBN 0-19-287592-2
- Darwin, Jonathan Howard, 1982. ISBN 9780192875563
- Kant, Roger Scruton, 1982. ISBN 9780192875778*
- Tolstoy, Henry Gifford, 1982. ISBN 9780192875440
- Bayle, Elisabeth Labrousse, 1983. ISBN 9780192875402
- Clausewitz, Michael Howard, 1983.*
- Cobbett, Raymond Williams, 1983. ISBN 9780192875754
- Diderot, Peter France, 1983. ISBN 9780192875501
- George Eliot, Rosemary Ashton, 1983. ISBN 9780192876263
- Hegel, Peter Singer, 1983.*
- Muhammad, Michael Cook, 1983. ISBN 9780192876058
- Plato, R. M. Hare, 1983. ISBN 9780192875853
- Proust, Derwent May, 1983. ISBN 9780192876119
- The Buddha, Michael Carrithers, 1983.*
- Thomas More, Anthony Kenny, 1983. ISBN 9780192875730
- William Morris, Peter Stansky, 1983. ISBN 9780192875716
- Chaucer, George Kane, 1984. ISBN 9780192875952
- Goethe, T. J. Reed, 1984. ISBN 9780192875020
- Lamarck, L. J. Jordanova, 1984. ISBN 9780192875877
- Leibniz, George MacDonald Ross, 1984. ISBN 9780192876201
- Locke, John Dunn, 1984. ISBN 9780192875600*
- Petrarch, Nicholas Mann, 1984. ISBN 9780192876102
- Adam Smith, D. D. Raphael, 1985. ISBN 9780192875587
- Bergson, Leszek Kołakowski, 1985. ISBN 9780192876454
- Cervantes, P. E. Russell, 1985. ISBN 9780192875693
- Gibbon, J. W. Burrow, 1985. ISBN 9780192875525
- Mill, William Thomas, 1985. ISBN 9780192875204
- Ruskin, George P. Landow, 1985. ISBN 9780192876034
- Vico, Peter Burke, 1985. ISBN 9780192876188
- Augustine Henry Chadwick, 1986. ISBN 9780192875341*
- Shakespeare, Germaine Greer, 1986. ISBN 9780192875389*
- Spinoza, Roger Scruton, 1986.*
- Virgil, Jasper Griffin, 1986. ISBN 9780192876546
- Descartes, Tom Sorell, 1987. ISBN 9780192876355
- Malthus, Donald Winch, 1987. ISBN 9780192876522*
- Montesquieu, Judith N. Shklar, 1987. ISBN 9780192876485
- Kierkegaard, Patrick Gardiner, 1988.*
- Wittgenstein, A. C. Grayling, 1988.*
- Arnold, Stefan Collini, 1989. ISBN 9780192876607
- Bentham, J. R. Dinwiddy, 1989. ISBN 9780192876225
- Hobbes, Richard Tuck, 1989.*
- Freud, Anthony Storr, 1989.*

=== 1990s ===
- Paine, Mark Philp, 1989. ISBN 9780192876669
- Disraeli, John Vincent, 1990. ISBN 9780192876812
- Erasmus, James McConica, 1991. ISBN 9780192875990
- Paul, E. P. Sanders, 1991. ISBN 9780192876799*
- Schiller, T. J. Reed, 1991. ISBN 9780192876706
- Durkheim, Frank Parkin, 1992. ISBN 9780192876720
- Samuel Johnson, Pat Rogers, 1993. ISBN 9780192875938
- Jung, Anthony Stevens, 1994.*
- Nietzsche, Michael Tanner, 1994. ISBN 9780192876805 *
- Schopenhauer, Christopher Janaway, 1994.*
- Tocqueville, Larry Siedentop, 1994. ISBN 9780192876904
- Rousseau, Robert Wokler, 1995.*
- Keynes, Robert Skidelsky, 1996. ISBN 9780192876898
- Russell, A. C. Grayling, 1996.*
- Gandhi, B. C. Parekh, 1997. ISBN 9780192876928*
- Heidegger, Michael Inwood, 1997. ISBN 9780585110806*
- Past Masters: German Philosophers: Kant, Hegel, Schopenhauer & Nietzsche, Roger Scruton et al., 1997.
- Three Great Economists: Smith, Malthus, Keynes, Keith Thomas et al., 1997. ISBN 9780192876942
- Frege, Joan Weiner, 1999. ISBN 9780192876959

*Also published as a Very Short Introduction.

== See also ==
- Fontana Modern Masters
