= Peter France =

British philologist

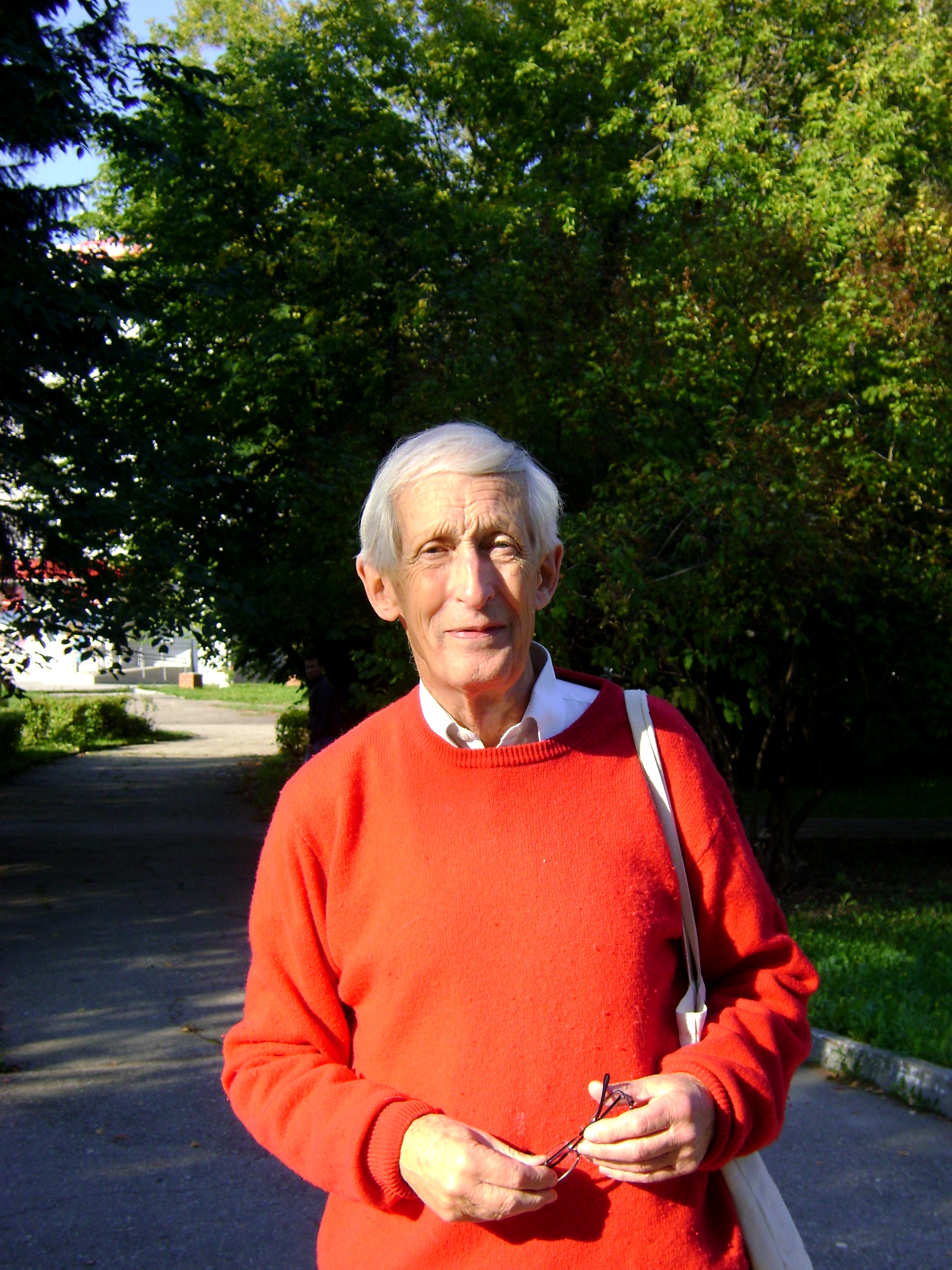
Professor Peter France

Peter France, FBA, FRSE (born 19 October 1935 at Derry), is a British academic and scholar of French literature, who served as Professor of French at the University of Edinburgh from 1980 to 1990.

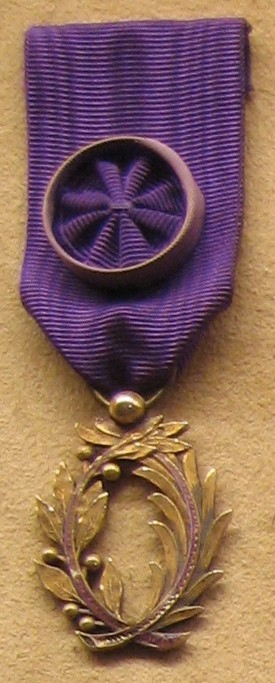

== Life ==
The son of Edgar France, he attended Bradford Grammar School before going up to Magdalen College, Oxford, where he graduated as BA and DPhil. He was appointed a Lecturer in French at the University of Sussex in 1963, later being promoted as Reader. In 1980 he transferred to the University of Edinburgh where he took up the professorial chair in French, which he relinquished in 1990, becoming a University Endowment Fellow before retiring in 2000.

== Honours and fellowships ==
- Officier, Palmes académiques (1990)
- Chevalier, Légion d'honneur (2001);
- FBA (1989; Member of Council 1992–95)
- FRSE (2003).

== Publications ==
Joint editor of the Oxford History of Literary Translation in English (5 volumes, 2005–10), France's other publications include:

- Racine's Rhetoric (Clarendon Press, 1965).
- Rhetoric and Truth in France (Clarendon Press, 1972).
- Poets of Modern Russia, Cambridge Studies in Modern Literature (Cambridge University Press, 1982).
- Diderot, Past Masters (Oxford University Press, 1983).
- Politeness and its Discontents: Problems in French Classical Culture, Cambridge Studies in French (Cambridge University Press, 1992).
- (Editor) The New Oxford Companion to Literature in French (Oxford University Press, 1995).
- (Editor) The Oxford Guide to Literature in English Translation (Oxford University Press, 2000).
- (Co-editor with William St Clair) Mapping Lives: The Uses of Biography (Oxford University Press for the British Academy, 2002).

Preceded by	Oxford University; Zaharoff Prize; 1958 - 1959	Succeeded by
