= George Kane (literary scholar) =

Canadian literary scholar

George Joseph Kane, FBA, FKC (4 July 1916 – 27 December 2008) was a Canadian literary scholar whose career was spent in England and the United States. A co-editor of the three-volume critical edition of William Langland's 14th-century poem Piers Plowman, he held professorships at Royal Holloway College, King's College London and the University of North Carolina at Chapel Hill.

== Early life, education and war service ==
George Joseph Kane was born in Humboldt, Saskatchewan, on 4 July 1916. (Note: Kane's obituary in the Biographical Memoirs of Fellows of the British Academy states that he was born on the 14 July, but his entry in Who's Who, his obituary in The Guardian and his entry in De Gruyter's Handbook of Medieval Studies give the 4 July.) His father had died before he was born and he was raised by his mother (a teacher) on her parents' farm in Saskatchewan; as they were Swiss and German, Kane grew up speaking German as well as English. From 1930 to 1934, he attended a college run by Benedictine monks, before studying at the University of Saskatchewan and then the University of British Columbia, graduating from the latter in 1936 with a degree in English and Latin; he secured a graduate scholarship to the University of Toronto, where he completed a master's degree in 1937. He then spent the 1937–38 year as a research fellow at Northwestern University.

In 1938, Kane began studying for a PhD at University College London; initially planning to work on a project on John Milton, it turned into editorial work on Piers Plowman under R. W. Chambers's supervision. However, his studies were soon interrupted by service in the Second World War from 1939; seriously wounded, he was taken prisoner during the Siege of Calais in 1940 and spent the rest of the war in captivity, wherein he studied French, learnt Italian, read German fiction and worked on several escape attempts.

== Academia ==
Returning to England after the war, he was appointed to an assistant lectureship at University College London in 1946. He also resumed his PhD, which was a critical study of the B-manuscript of Piers Plowman, passus 18 to 20; the degree was awarded in 1946. Kane was promoted to a full lectureship in 1948 and authored Middle English Literature: A Critical Study of the Romances, the Religious Lyrics, Piers Plowman in 1951. He was promoted to a readership two years later and in 1955, he was appointed Professor of English Language and Literature at Royal Holloway College, London. Kane was by then occupied with editing the three manuscript texts of Piers Plowman for publication as critical editions. The first of these (the A text) appeared in 1960, published by Athlone Press. In 1963, he received the British Academy's Sir Israel Gollancz Memorial Prize for his efforts.

In 1965, Kane moved again, to King's College London, to be Professor of English Language and Medieval Literature, where he remained until he retired in 1976; he was the university's Public Orator from 1962 to 1966 and the dean of the Faculty of Arts from 1972 to 1974. At King's, Kane wrote Piers Plowman: The Evidence for Authorship (1965), gave the Chambers Memorial Lecture at University College London in 1965, was elected a fellow of the British Academy in 1968 and became a corresponding fellow of the Medieval Academy of America in 1970. With E. Talbot Donaldson, he continued editing the B text of Piers of Plowman, which was published in 1975. In 1976, he became a fellow of King's College London.

From 1976 to 1987, Kane was the William Rand Kenan Jr Professor of English at the University of North Carolina at Chapel Hill; he chaired the Division of Humanities from 1980 to 1983. From 1987 to 1989, he was a National Endowment for the Humanities fellow. His time in the United States saw him bestowed with several academic honours: he was elected a fellow of the American Academy of Arts and Sciences in 1977 and of the Medieval Academy of America in 1978 (he also received the latter's Haskins Medal in 1978). He also turned his attention to Geoffrey Chaucer's works. Alongside writing Chaucer for Oxford University Press's Past Masters series in 1984, he produced a number of important articles on the topic, some of which were compiled to form Chaucer and Langland: Historical and Textual Approaches (1989). His and Janet Cowen's edition of Legend of Good Women was published in 1995. All the while, he continued with the Piers Plowman work and in 1997 the edition of the C text he worked on with George Russell was also published. Two years later, he received the Gollancz Prize for a second time, a very rare honour. In 2005, his book The Piers Plowman Glossary was published. Kane died on 27 December 2008; his wife Bridget, the sister of one of his fellow wartime prisoners, survived him as did their daughter.
