= D. Nichol Smith =

Scottish academic

David Nichol Smith FBA (16 September 1875 – 18 January 1962) was a Scottish literary scholar and Merton Professor of English Literature at Oxford University.

== Background ==
Smith was born in Edinburgh, educated at George Watson's College, the University of Edinburgh and the Sorbonne in Paris. He was an editor of textbooks before taking a position as an English professor at Armstrong College in 1904 and reader in English at Oxford University, where he lived until his death. In 1921 he was elected fellow of Merton College, where he was Merton Professor of English from 1929 to 1946. In 1937, he gave the Alexander Lectures in Toronto, Canada, and arranged travel through the United States, visiting his pupils who were strategically placed across the whole continent. He followed their careers with the greatest interest, and always welcomed them back to his study in 20 Merton Street, where one was sometimes surprised to learn the latest news of what was happening in universities in California or Australia.

In his retirement he travelled widely and he was Professor of English at Adelaide University in 1950–51.
