= Norman Davis (academic) =

New Zealand scholar

Norman Davis MBE FBA (16 May 1913 – 2 December 1989) was a New Zealand-born professor of English language and literature at the University of Oxford.

== Early life and career ==
Davis was born in 1913 at Dunedin, New Zealand. He received his education at Otago Boys' High School and the University of Otago, where he was taught by Professor Herbert Ramsay. He was awarded a Rhodes scholarship to Merton College, Oxford, in 1934 and studied comparative philology. From 1937 to 1938, he lectured in English at the University of Kaunas in Lithuania, and then at the University of Sofia, Bulgaria, 1938–39.

== Second World War ==
According to his biographer James McNeish, Davis was "undistinguished in appearance" and had a talent for mimicry. When the Second World War broke out, he was recruited by the Special Operations Executive and became Assistant Press Attaché at the British Legation in Sofia. In 1941, he warned the British ambassador in Sofia, George William Rendel, of Bulgaria's imminent admission to the Axis. He smuggled the leader of the Bulgarian resistance, G. M. Dimitrov, out of Bulgaria to the safety of the British Legation in Turkey (January–February 1941). Davis was trying to escape from Yugoslavia when he was captured by the Italians and interned in Italy for three months, before being repatriated to England. He continued his clandestine work, operating out of Turkey under an assumed name. His wife Lena was also "in the firm".

Davis and Dimitrov were tried in Sofia for subversion and sentenced in absentia to execution by hanging. At the end of the war, Davis had reached the rank of major, and in 1945 he was awarded an MBE.

== Post-war academic career ==
Davis resumed his university teaching as a lecturer in English language at Queen Mary College, University of London, in 1946, having proceeded to MA at Oxford in 1944. He was then appointed to a similar position at Oriel and Brasenose Colleges, Oxford, where he also lectured in Medieval English. From 1949 to 1959, he taught at Glasgow University. He then succeeded J. R. R. Tolkien as Merton Professor of English Language and Literature at Oxford, a position he held until his retirement in 1980.

According to McNeish,"... he liked to say that his achievement was that he "added a letter to the Bulgarian alphabet", but his monument is the great edition of the Paston Letters, "a text throwing light on the attitudes of a 15th-century English family in Norfolk on the make."

== Death ==
Davis died in Oxford on 2 December 1989. Practically his entire estate was left to the University of Otago. According to McNeish, the proper use of the funds was contested by his executor, as Otago's University Council decided to use them to fund visiting academics, rather than for sending New Zealand scholars to benefit from study at Oxford.

== Sources ==
- McNeish, James (2003). Dance of the Peacocks: New Zealanders in exile in the time of Hitler and Mao Tse-Tung. Virago.
