= George C. Boon =

British archaeologist, numismatist and museum curator

- Born: 20 September 1927; Bristol
- Died: 31 August 1994 (aged 66)
- Education: Bristol University
- Known for: Excavations at Caerleon
- Awards: FSA
- Scientific career
- Fields: Archaeology Numismatics
- Workplaces: National Museum of Wales

George Counsell Boon FSA (20 September 1927 – 31 August 1994) was a British archaeologist, numismatist, and museum curator. He was known for his work on the Roman sites of Caerleon and Silchester.

== Early years ==
Boon was born in Bristol on the 20 September 1927 and studied Latin at Bristol University under Arnaldo Momigliano. While still a student he carried out his first excavation, at the Kings Weston Park Roman villa in Bristol.

== Reading Museum and Silchester ==
After graduating from Bristol, he took a job as an archaeological assistant at Reading Museum in 1950. Here he catalogued the collection of artefacts from the excavations of the nearby Roman town of Calleva Atrebatum, modern Silchester, carried out by the Society of Antiquaries before the First World War. He published two books on Silchester: Roman Silchester (1957) and Silchester: The Roman Town of Calleva (1974).

== The National Museum of Wales ==
In 1957 he moved to the National Museum of Wales in Cardiff as Assistant Keeper of Archaeology where he remained until his retirement. He became Keeper at the National Museum of Wales in 1976 and Curator in 1987.

He began first of many rescue excavations at Caerleon as soon as he arrived in Cardiff. Caerleon was the site of a Roman legionary fortress, Isca Augusta and Boon published many papers and monographs on the site.

Boon also published many papers on prehistoric, Roman and medieval artefacts such as pottery, metalwork and glass as well as papers on Roman, medieval and post-medieval coins.

== Honours and awards ==
George Boon was a member of the Society of Antiquaries and served as its vice-president from 1980 to 1984. He was also a Vice-President of the Roman Society from 1977 to his death in 1994.

He became a Fellow of the Royal Numismatic Society and joined the British Numismatic Society in 1980, where he was elected a member of Council in 1983 and continued to serve on the council until 1986.

== Personal life ==
In 1956 he married Diana Martyn and they had two sons and one daughter. He died at Penarth on 31 August 1994.

== Selected Bibliography ==
- Boon, George C. A Hundred and One Coins: Some of the Varieties Commonly Brought for Identification. National Museum of Wales, 1973.
- Boon, George C. Cardiganshire Silver and the Aberystwyth Mint in Peace & War. National Museum of Wales, 1981.
- Boon, George C. Coins of the Anarchy, 1135–54. National Museum of Wales, 1988.
- Boon, George C. Isca, the Roman Legionary Fortress at Caerleon, Mon. National Museum of Wales, 1972.
- Boon, George C. Laterarium Iscanum: The Antefixes, Brick & Tile-Stamps of the Second Augustan Legion. Amgueddfa Genedlaethol Cymru, 1984.
- Boon, George C. Monographs & Collections: Relating to Excavations Financed by H.M. Department of the Environment in Wales. 1, Roman Sites. Cambrian Archaeological Association, 1978.
- Boon, George C. Roman Sites. Cambrian Archaeological Association, 1978.
- Boon, George C. Silchester : The Roman Town of Calleva. David and Charles, 1974.
- Boon, George C. The Legionary Fortress of Caerleon-Isca: A Brief Account. Roman Legionary Museum, 1987.
- Boon, George C. The Roman Town Calleva Atrebatum at Silchester Hampshire: A New Guide. Reading Museum in Conjunction with the Calleva Museum Committee, 1963.
- Boon, George C. Welsh Hoards 1979–1981: The Coinage of Cnut in Wales, the Coinage of the Empress Maud, the Earliest Portrait Esterlings: With an Appendix of Other Hoards from Viking Times to the Dissolution of the Monasteries. National Museum of Wales, 1986.
- Boon, George C. Welsh Industrial Tokens and Medals: Sidelights on 18th and 19th Century Industrial Development. National Museum of Wales, 1973.
- Boon, George C. Welsh Tokens of the Seventeenth Century. National Museum of Wales, 1973.
- Boon, George C., and Jillian Greenaway. The Roman Town Calleva Atrebatum at Silchester Hampshire. Published by Reading Museum in Conjunction with the Calleva Museum Committee, 1983.
- Boon, George C., and M. W. Hassall. The Coins. Published on Behalf of the Board of Celtic Studies of the University of Wales [by] University of Wales Press, 1982.
- Quinnell, Henrietta., and Marion. Blockley. Excavations at Rhuddlan, Clwyd: 1969–73 Mesolithic to Medieval. Council for British Archaeology, 1994.
- Zienkiewicz, J. David., and George C. Boon. The Legionary Fortress Baths at Caerleon. 1, The Buildings. National Museum of Wales, 1986.
