= Henry Cecil Kennedy Wyld =

English lexicographer and philologist

Henry Cecil Kennedy Wyld (27 March 1870 – 26 January 1945) was a notable English lexicographer and philologist.

== Early life ==
Wyld was born in 1870 and attended Charterhouse School from 1883 to 1885; he was then privately educated in Lausanne from 1885 to 1888. He studied at the University of Bonn, the University of Heidelberg and Corpus Christi College, Oxford.

== Academic career ==
From 1904 to 1920, Wyld was Baines Professor of English Language and Philology at the University of Liverpool. He was Merton Professor of English Language and Literature at the University of Oxford and a fellow of Merton College, Oxford, from 1920 until his death in 1945.

== Publications ==
Wyld was the author of many papers and books during his career. His Universal Dictionary of the English Language was published in 1932.

== Honours ==
Wyld was awarded the British Academy Biennial Prize for contributions to the study of the English Language and Literature in 1932.

== Quotations ==
- No gentleman goes on a bus

== Selected bibliography ==
- 1908: The Teaching of Reading in Training Colleges
- 1914: A Short History of English
- 1920: A History of Modern Colloquial English
- 1923: Studies in Rhymes
- 1923: Some Aspects of the Diction of English Poetry
