= F. P. Wilson =

British literary scholar (1889–1963)

F. P. Wilson's best known work, English Drama, 1485–1585.

Frank Percy Wilson FBA (11 October 1889 – 29 May 1963) was a British literary scholar and bibliographer. Author of many works on Elizabethan drama and general editor of the Oxford History of English Literature, Wilson was Merton Professor of English Literature at the University of Oxford from 1947 to 1957.

== Education and early career ==
Wilson was born and raised in Birmingham, studying at King Edward's School, Birmingham. He received his BA (1911) and MA (1912) in English at the University of Birmingham, and a B. Litt. at Lincoln College, Oxford, in 1913, writing his thesis on Thomas Dekker.

At the outbreak of World War I Wilson joined the army, serving in France, and sustaining serious injuries at Battle of the Somme in 1916. Recovery in hospital took over a year, and, besides, left Wilson with a permanent limp and vulnerability to recurrent infections. He returned to Oxford as University Lecturer in 1921 and was promoted to Reader in 1927. He became the Tutor of C. S. Lewis in 1922. At Oxford, Wilson published Dekker's Foure Birds of Noahs Arke (1924) and Plague Pamphlets of T. Dekker (1925). He worked on and off for many years on a four volume edition of Dekker's prose works, but it was never completed. However, the incidental, The Plague in Shakespeare's London (1925) proved popular with readers and was brought out in paperback in 1958.

== Later career ==
During the next three decades, Wilson was to serve as Professor of English Literature at the University of Leeds (1929–1936), Hildred Carlile professor of English literature at Bedford College, London (1936–1947), and Merton Professor of English Literature at Oxford (1947–57), remaining at Oxford for three years more as Senior Research Fellow at Merton College.

He visited many American academic institutions during this time, including Huntington Library in San Marino, California, on three separate occasions, Columbia University, Folger Shakespeare Library and Stanford University. In addition, he gave lectures, all later published, at University of Toronto, Smith College, Johns Hopkins University, and UCLA.

With Bonamy Dobrée, Wilson became in 1935 the general editor of the Oxford History of English Literature. He wrote the volume, English drama from 1485 to 1642 himself. He gave British Academy lectures in 1941 and the Clark Lectures at Trinity College, Cambridge, in 1951, both published later in book form.

During World War II, in spite of his disability, Wilson served in the Home Guard. He became general editor of the Malone Society in 1948 and during his dozen years at the helm edited reprints of many works were produced including those of John Fletcher, Samuel Rowley, and Thomas Middleton.

== Critical reputation, influence, and honours ==
According to ODNB biographers, Jean Robertson and P. J. Connell, "The chief merits of Wilson's dramatic criticism were his constant alertness to the exigencies of the stage (he was a promising amateur actor in his early days); and, most remarkably, his unrivalled knowledge of contemporary word usage and phraseology,..." yielding ultimately his Oxford Dictionary of English Proverbs. He was, they continue, "the most learned Elizabethan scholar of his generation, as well as a master of social graces and a witty conversationalist."

Wilson was elected Fellow of the British Academy in 1943 and awarded an honorary LLD of the University of Birmingham in 1947; he was made an honorary fellow of Lincoln College, Oxford, in 1948. F. P. Wilson died at his home in Berkshire, on 29 May 1963.

== Bibliography ==
- Wilson, Frank Percy (1921), The Plague-pamphlets of Thomas Dekker: With an Account of the Plague in London from 1603 to 1630, University of Birmingham, Department of English, ISBN 9780781272001
- Ben Jonson; F. P. Wilson (1921), Comicall Satyre of Every Man Out of His Humor ..., Malone Society, ISBN 9781465505231
- Thomas Dekker (1925), F. P. Wilson (ed.), Foure Birds of Noahs Arke, D. Appleton
- Wilson, Frank Percy (1927), The plague in Shakespeare's London, Oxford University Press
- Wilson, F. P. (1954), Marlowe and the Early Shakespeare, Clark Lectures at Trinity College, Cambridge, 1951, Clarendon Press
- Wilson, F. P. (1960), Seventeenth Century Prose: Five Lectures, Cambridge University Press, ISBN 978-1-107-60712-5
- Wilson, F. P. (1969), Oxford History of English Literature, Vol 4 Pt 1: The English Drama, 1485 - 1585, G. K. Hunter (ed), Oxford: Clarendon Press
- Wilson, Frank Percy (1970), "The English history play" and "Shakespeare's Comedies", in Gardner, Helen; Louise, Dame (eds.), Shakespearian and Other Studies, Wilson, F. P. (Frank Percy), Clarendon Press, ISBN 9780198116776
- Wilson, F. P. (1970), The Oxford Dictionary of English Proverbs 3 Ed. Rev. by F. P. Wilson, Oxford: Clarendon Press
- Wilson, Frank Percy (1978), The proverbial wisdom of Shakespeare, Presidential address of the Modern Humanities Research Association 1961, Folcroft Library Edition
- Wilson, Frank Percy (1978), Shakespeare and the Diction of Common Life, British Academy Lecture 1941, Norwood Editions, ISBN 978-0-8482-6950-0
