= Karl E. Young =

American academic (1903–1990)

Karl Egbert Young (1903–1990) was a professor of English and related subjects at Brigham Young University (BYU) who wrote several books, primarily dealing with the Mormon colonies in northern Mexico and the flight of these colonists back to the United States in 1912.

Young was born in Vernal, Utah to Francis Marion Young and his wife the former Anna Genevra Egbert. His father was a son of Lorenzo Dow Young, who was a brother of Brigham Young.

Shortly after Young was born his parents became missionaries for the Church of Jesus Christ of Latter-day Saints in Samoa, where they lived with Karl and his sister. Young received a bachelor's degree in French from the Utah State Agricultural College (now Utah State University), then attended Harvard University for a short time before going to the University of Oxford as a Rhodes Scholar.

In 1930 Young joined the faculty of BYU as a teacher of French and English. He was a member of the BYU faculty for 41 years, being the head coordinator of the Freshman English Program for 25 years and head of BYU's English as a second language program for 5 years. Young also conducted various studies of Native American culture.

Young also studied Mormon and Utah folklore. He was one of the contributing authors to Thomas E. Cheney's 1971 volume Lore of Faith and Folly.

== Publications ==
- "Winter Feasts at San Ildefonso" in BYU Studies, Vol. 6 (1965) vo. 2, p. 93.
- The Long Hot Summer of 1912 First Book in the Merrill Monograph Series published by BYU Press.
- Charles Redd: Profile of the Renasaince Man as a Rancher
- Ordeal in Mexico published by Deseret Book, 1968.

== Sources ==
- Thomas J. Schaeper and Kathleen Schaeper. Rhodes Scholars, Oxford and the Creation of an American Elite. p. 368
- Mormon Literature Database entry for Karl E. Young
- Deseret News Obituary of Karl E. Young, Aug. 23, 1990
- Ernest L. Wilkinson and Leonard J. Arrington, ed., Brigham Young University: The First 100 Years (Provo: BYU Press, 1975) p. 583.
- Archival Materials relating to Karl E. Young, L. Tom Perry Special Collections, Harold B. Lee Library, Brigham Young University
