= August Sauer =

Austrian Germanist and literary historian (1855–1926)

August Sauer (12 October 1855, in Wiener Neustadt – 17 September 1926, in Prague) was an Austrian Germanist and literary historian. He is known for his publication of collected works by Franz Grillparzer, Ferdinand Raimund, Adalbert Stifter, et al.

He studied philology and history at the University of Vienna as a pupil of Franz Brentano, Ottokar Lorenz and Richard Heinzel. In 1877 he received his doctorate under the direction of Karl Tomaschek, then furthered his education in Berlin as a student of Karl Müllenhoff and Wilhelm Scherer. From 1879 he worked as an instructor and director of the seminar for German philology at the University of Lemberg, and in 1883 became an associate professor of German language and literature at the University of Graz. In 1886, he succeeded Jakob Minor at the University of Prague, where in 1892 he became a full professor of German language and literature. At Prague, he served as dean (1897/98) and university rector (1907/08).

In 1894 he founded the literary history journal Euphorion.

== Selected works ==
- Studien zur Goethe-Philologie (with Jakob Minor, 1880) – Studies of Goethe-philology.
- Ferdinand Raimund's sämmtliche Werke (with Karl Glossy; 3 volumes, 1881) – Ferdinand Raimund's collected works.
- Deutsche Litteraturdenkmale des 18. und 19. Jahrhunderts (with Bernhard Seuffert; multi-volume, 1881–1924) – German literary monuments of the 18th and 19th centuries.
- Wiener neudrucke (11 volumes, 1883–86) – Vienna reprints.
- Ewald von Kleist's werke (3 volumes, 1883) – Ewald Christian von Kleist's works.
- Gedichte von Gottfried August Bürger (1884) – Poetry of Gottfried August Bürger.
- Grillparzer's sämmtliche Werke (4th edition, 16 volumes, 1887) – Franz Grillparzer's collected works.
- Adalbert Stifters sämmtliche Werke (24 volumes, 1901–) – Adalbert Stifter's collected works.
- Gesammelte reden und aufsätze zur geschichte der literatur in Österreich und Deutschland (1903) – Collected lectures and essays on the history of literature in Austria and Germany.
