= Jakob Minor =

Austrian literary historian (1855–1912)

Jakob Minor (15 April 1855, in Vienna – 7 October 1912, in Vienna) was an Austrian literary historian and Germanist.

He studied under Karl Tomaschek and Richard Heinzel at the University of Vienna, and later furthered his education in Berlin as a student of Karl Müllenhoff and Wilhelm Scherer. From 1882 he taught classes at the scientific-literary academy in Milan, and in 1884 became an associate professor at the University of Prague. In 1885 he succeeded Erich Schmidt at Vienna, where in 1888 he was appointed professor of German language and literature. In 1905 he became a member of the Vienna Academy of Sciences.

== Selected works ==
- Christian Felix Weiße und seine Beziehungen zur deutschen Literatur des achtzehnten Jahrhunderts, 1880 – Christian Felix Weiße and his relationship to German literature of the 18th century.
- Studien zur Goethe-Philologie (1880; with August Sauer) – Studies of Goethe-philology.
- Johann Georg Hamann in seiner Bedeutung für die Sturm- und Drangperiode, 1882 – Johann Georg Hamann and his importance in the Sturm und Drang period.
- Lessings Jugendfreunde: Chr. Felix Weisse, Joh. Friedr. v. Cronegk, Joach. Wilh. v. Brawe, Friedrich Nicolai, 1883 – Gotthold Ephraim Lessing's friends from youth; Christian Felix Weiße, Johann Friedrich von Cronegk, Joachim Wilhelm von Brawe and Christoph Friedrich Nicolai.
- Schiller. Sein Leben und seine Werke (2 volumes, 1890) – Friedrich Schiller, his life and works.
- Ferdinand von Saar. Eine Studie, 1898 – Ferdinand von Saar; a study.
- Goethes Faust. Entstehungsgeschichte und Erklärung (2 volumes, 1901) – Goethe's Faust; developmental history and explanation.
- Franz Grillparzers werke, 1903 – Franz Grillparzer's works.
- Novalis Schriften (4 volumes, 1907) – Novalis writings.
