= Muspilli =

Old High German poem

Muspilli is an Old High German alliterative verse poem known in incomplete form (103 lines) from a ninth-century Bavarian manuscript. Its subject is the fate of the soul immediately after death and at the Last Judgment. Many aspects of the interpretation of the poem, including its title, remain controversial among scholars.

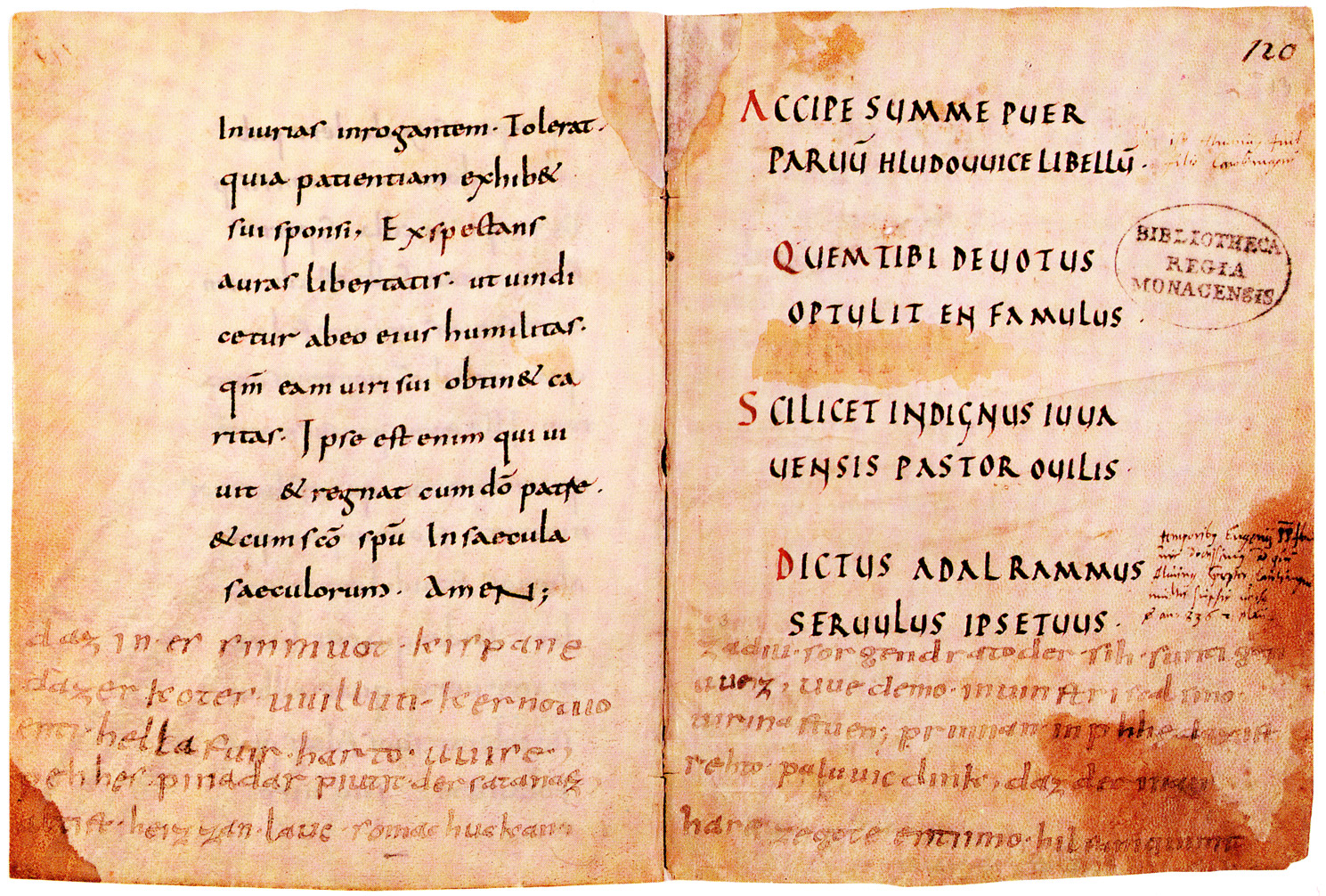
Parts of the Muspilli at the bottom of a page of the manuscript once in the possession of Louis the German

== Manuscript ==
The text is extant in a single ninth-century manuscript: Clm 14098 of the Bavarian State Library, Munich. The bulk of the manuscript contains a Latin theological text presented between 821 and 827 by Adalram, bishop of Salzburg, to the young Louis the German (c. 810–876). Into this orderly written manuscript, the text of the Muspilli was untidily entered, with numerous scribal errors, using blank pages, lower margins and even the dedication page.

Though in Carolingian minuscules, the handwriting is not that of a trained scribe. The language is essentially Bavarian dialect of the middle or late 9th century. The poem's beginning and ending are missing: they were probably written on the manuscript's outer leaves, which have since been lost. Legibility has always been a problem with this text, and some early editors used reagents which have left permanent stains. There are many conjectural readings, some of them crucial to modern interpretation of the work. (Note: As standard references on this text (all with select bibliographies) see Steinhoff (1987); Staiti (2002); Hellgardt (2013).)

Bavarian State Library CLM 14098, folios containing Muspilli

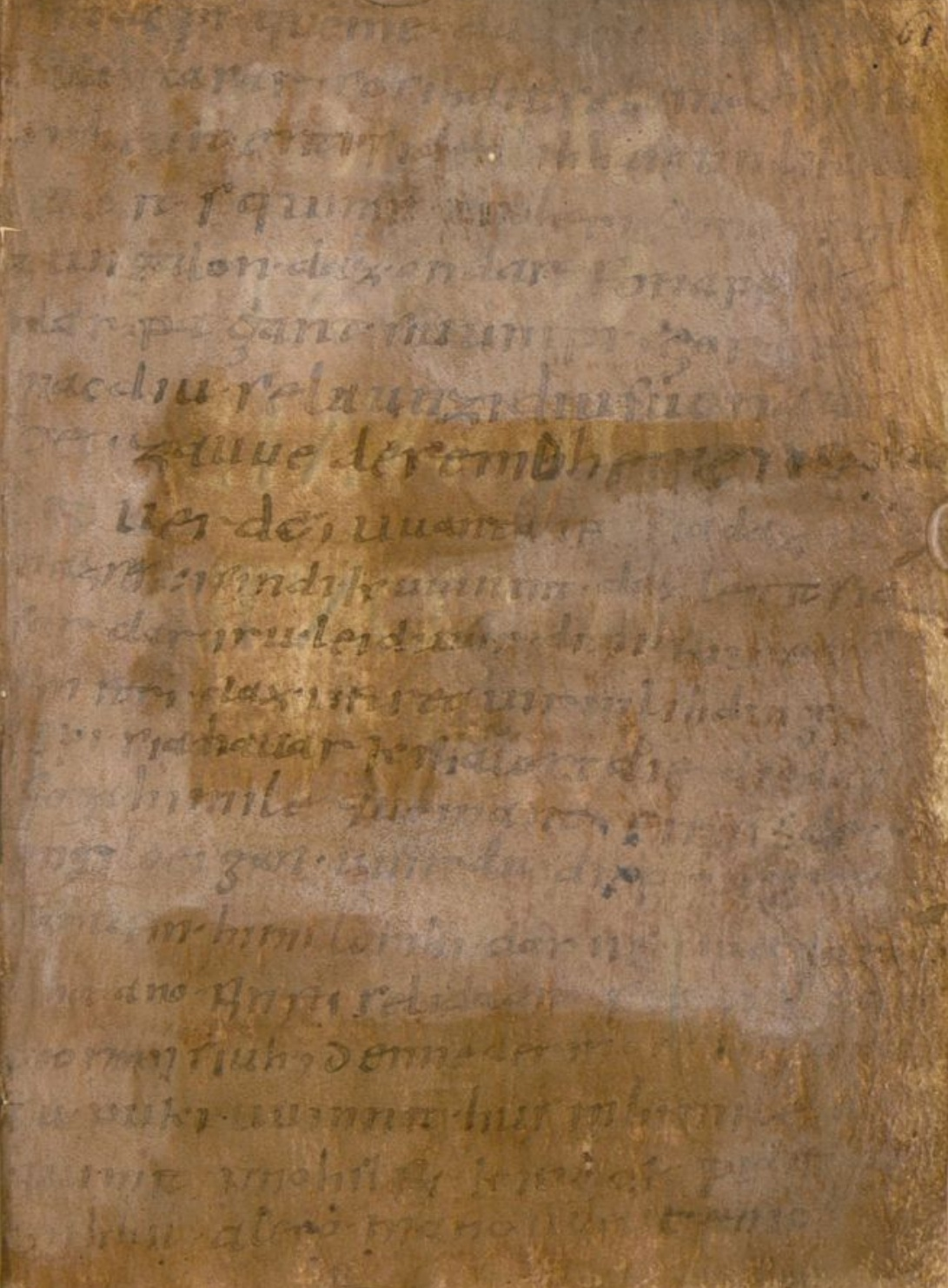
folio 61 recto

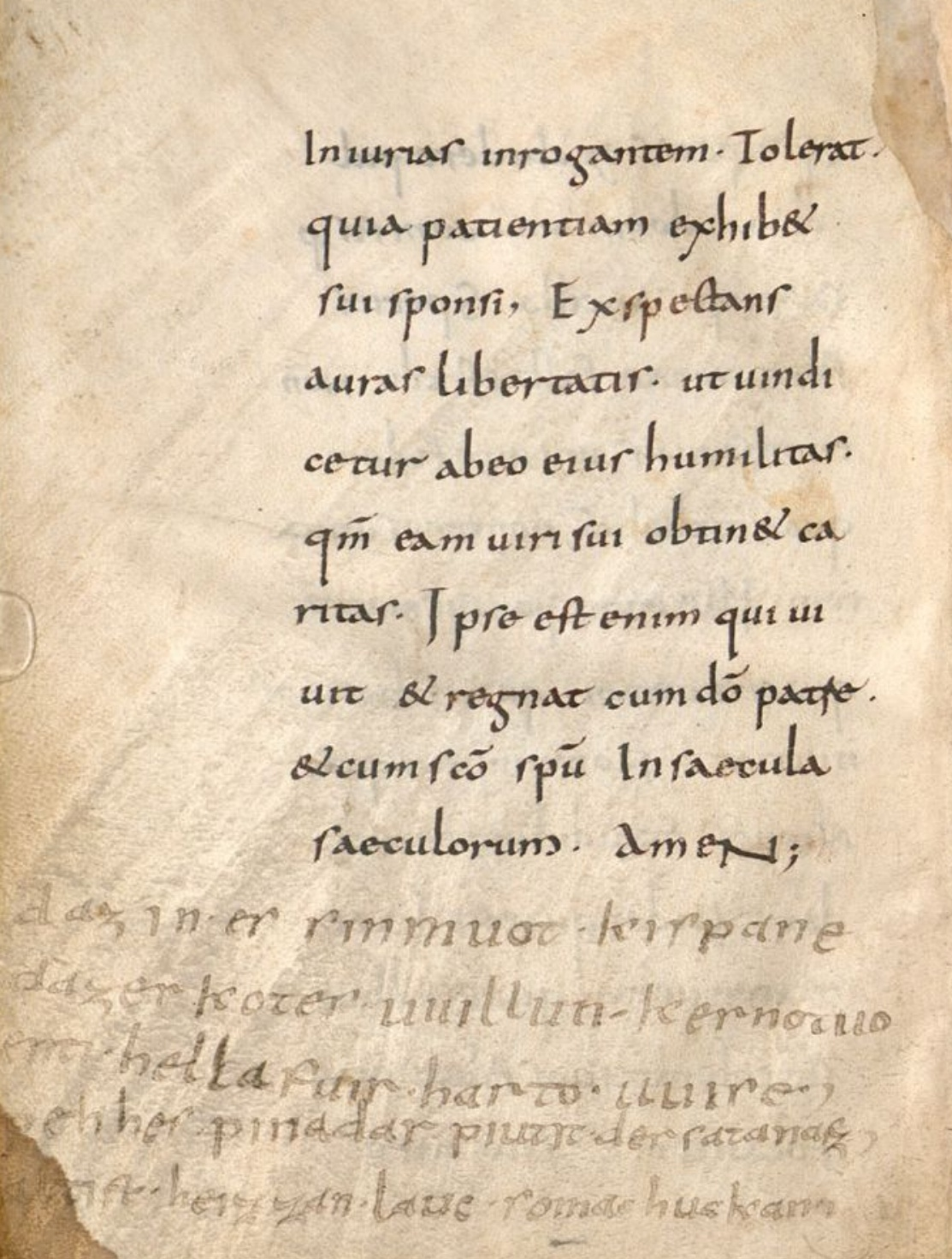
folio 119 verso

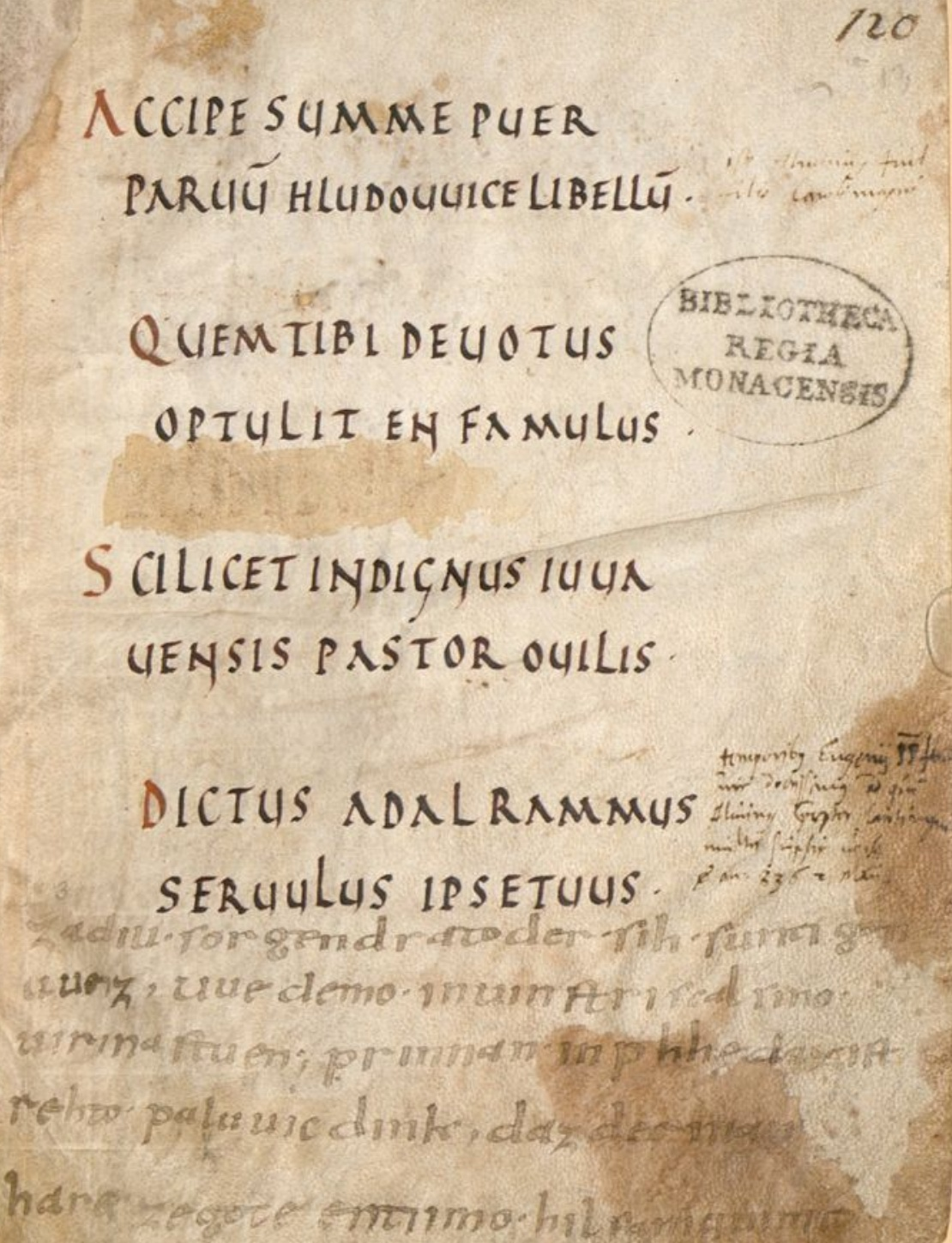
folio 120 recto

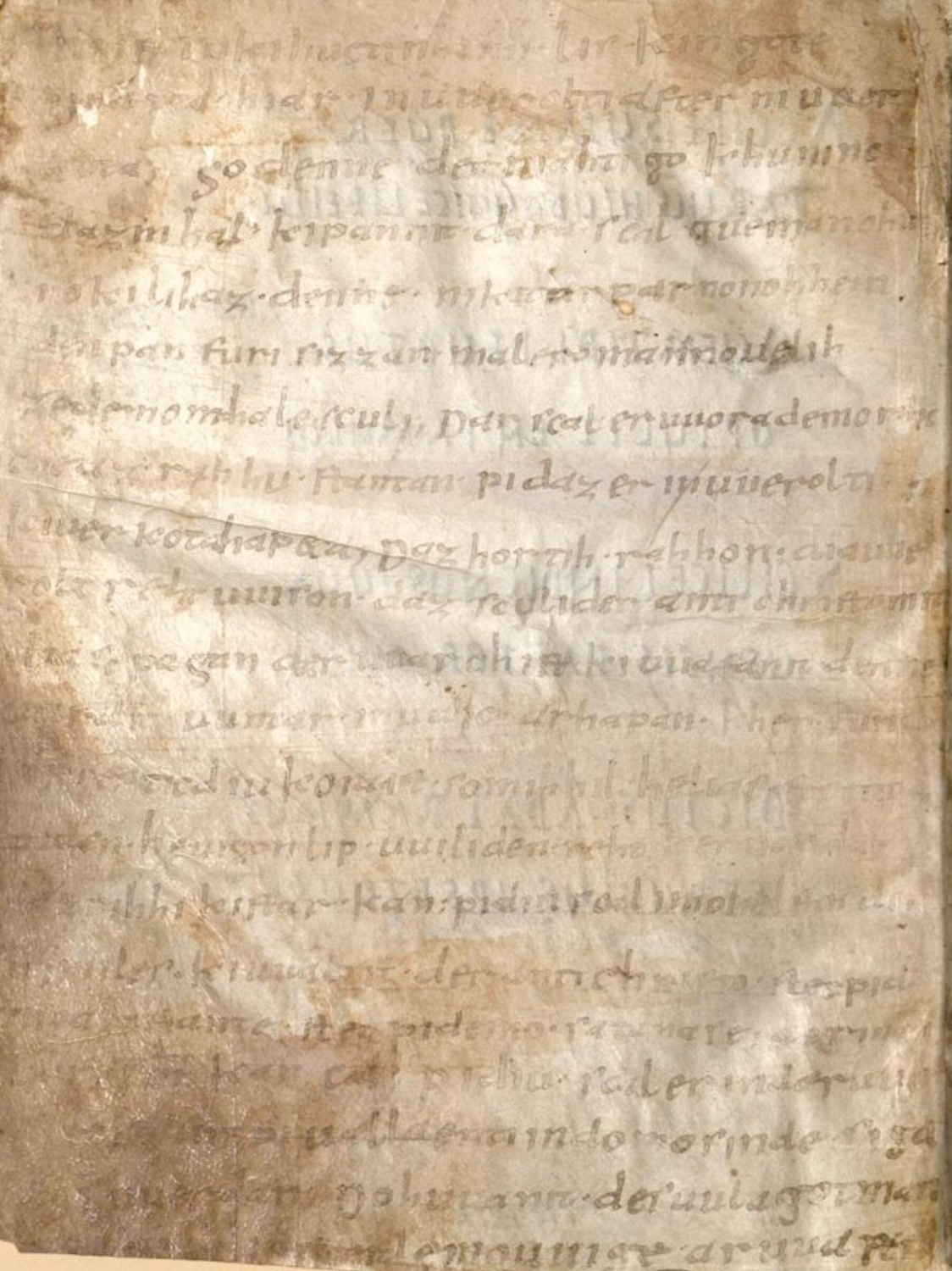
folio 120 verso

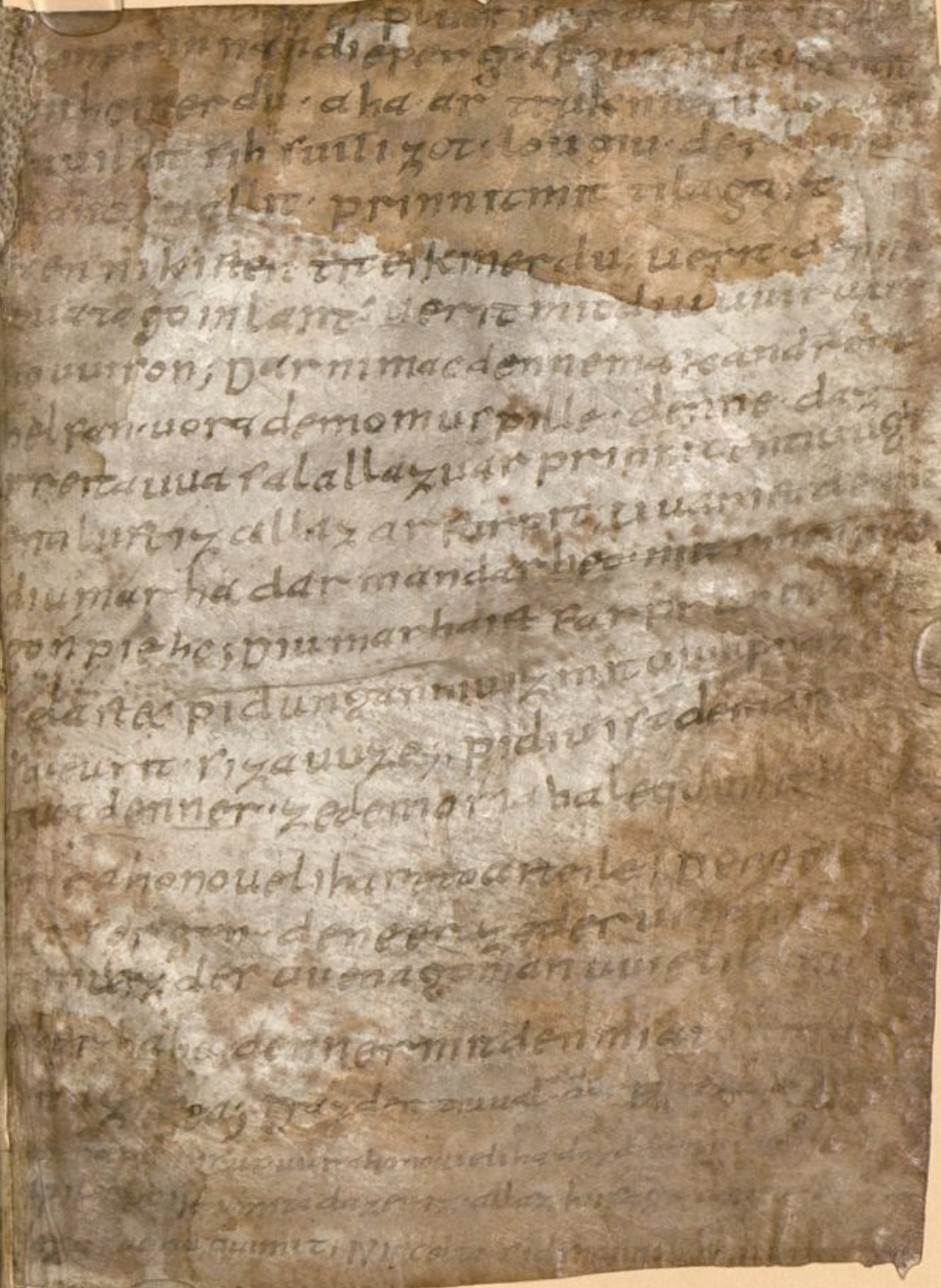
folio 121 recto

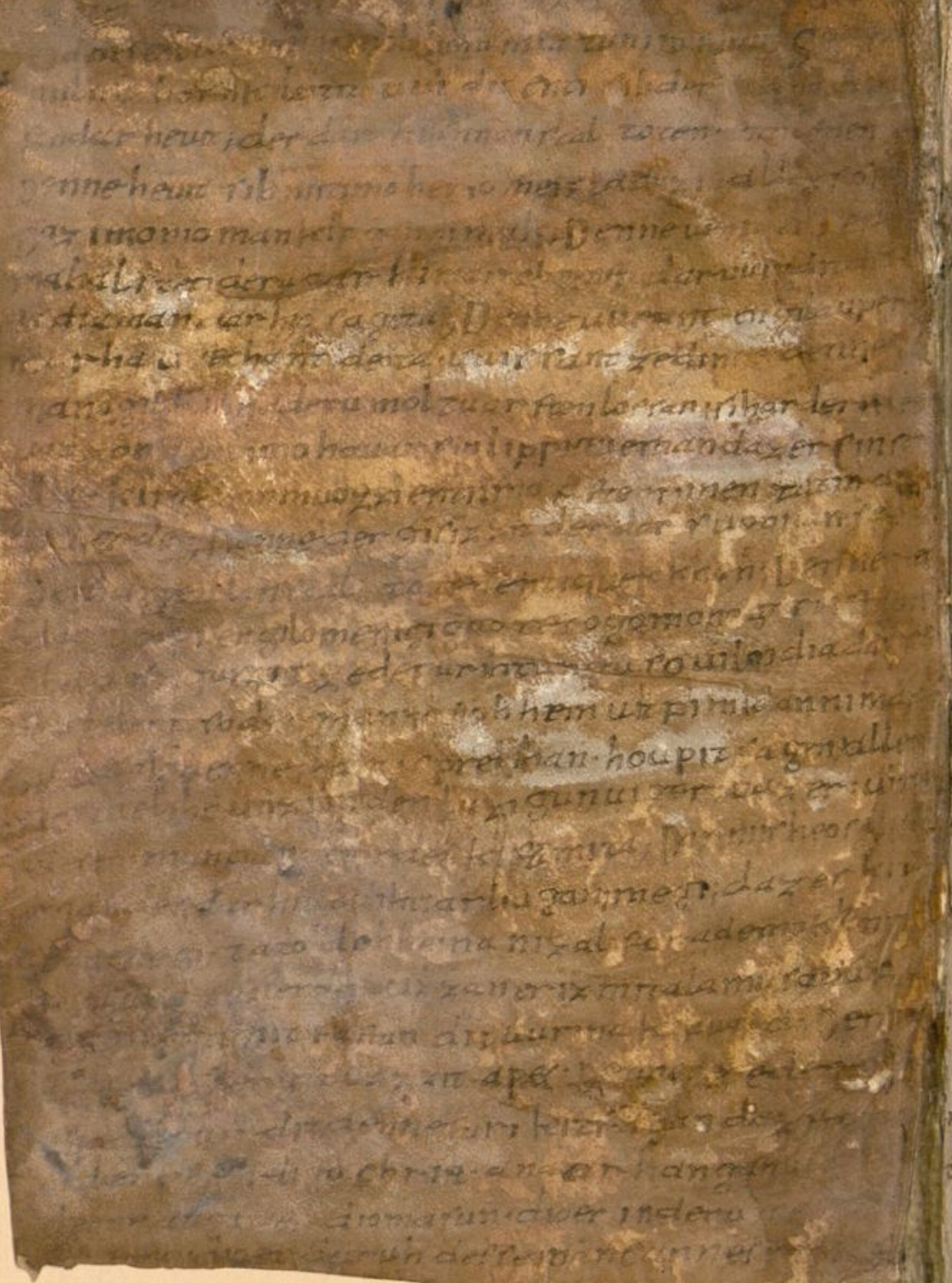
folio 121 verso

== Metrical form ==
Most of the poem is in alliterative verse of very uneven quality. (Note: Ideally, '[t]he long line is divided into two by a strong caesura, and the halves, each of which has two major stresses, are linked by alliteration – that is, by the identity of initial sounds – in some of these stresses. The most important stress is that on the first beat of the second half-line'. Though found elsewhere in Old High German and Old Saxon, this form is much better represented in Old English and Old Norse. See also Bostock, King & McLintock.) Some lines contain rhymes, using a poetic form pioneered in the ninth century by Otfrid of Weissenburg (c. 790–875). (Note: Otfrid still used the traditional long lines divided centrally at a caesura, but with rhymes or assonances at each half-line, and in general no attempt at alliteration. On Otfridian verse, see Bostock, King & McLintock.) This formal unevenness has often led scholars to regard the surviving text as a composite made up of older material and younger accretions – an impression reinforced by the poem's thematic and stylistic diversity. But it is also possible that a single poet deliberately chose to vary the verse forms in this way. (Note: Kolb (1964); Mohr & Haug (1977); Murdoch (1983).)

== Synopsis ==
- (Lines 1–17) Directly after death, armies of angels and devils will fight for a person's soul, and they will transport it immediately, either to the joys of an eternal dwelling in Heaven, or to the fire, darkness and torments of Hell.
- (18–30) Everyone must therefore do God's will in this world. Divine help can no longer be obtained, once a person lies suffering in Hell.
- (31–36) When the Mighty King issues His summons (daz mahal kipannit), all humans must attend and account for their actions on earth.
- (37–47) The poet has heard dia uueroltrehtuuîson (possibly: 'men wise in the laws of the world') saying that Elias (the Old Testament prophet Elijah) will fight with and defeat the Antichrist. Elias will be acting with God's help as a champion of those seeking righteousness, to secure for them a place in Heaven. The Antichrist will be supported by Satan. He will pull him down. He will therefore be denied a victory in the encounter. (Note: Some commentators (e.g.) found these pronouns confusing, but the simplest reading is that the Antichrist will be defeated precisely because he has Satan on his side. See Brennecke.)
- (48–62) But (many?) men of God (gotmann-) believe that in that battle Elias will be wounded (or killed?). (When?) Elias's blood drips onto the earth, (then?) mountains will burst into flame, trees will no longer stand, waters will dry up, the moon will fall, the sky will smoulder, middle-earth (mittilagart) will burn. (Note: This summary ignores the problematic half-line 55a (... en ni kisten titeikinerdu), sometimes read as '(When?) no stone is left standing on the earth'. For other suggestions see Mohr & Haug.) With the Day of Punishment or Penance (stuatago) (Note: Minis suggests tuatago 'Doomsday') at hand, no man is able to help a kinsman before the muspilli. Amidst this destruction, what is left of the borderlands where humans once fought alongside their kinsfolk? (Note: Partly following Kolb; sometimes misunderstood as '... fought against ...'.) Damned souls have no further chance of remorse and will be taken off to Hell.
- (63–72) A man should judge fairly on earth, because then he need not worry when standing before the Heavenly Judge. When a man disrupts the law by taking bribes, he is being secretly watched by the Devil, who will recall his misdeeds at the Final Judgment.
- (73–99a) When the Heavenly Horn is sounded, the Judge, accompanied by an unconquerable host of angels, sets out for the place marked out for judgment. Angels will wake the dead and guide them to the judicial assembly (ding). All human beings will rise from the earth, free themselves from the bondage of the grave-mounds (lossan sih ar dero leuuo vazzon) and receive back their bodies, so that they may speak fully to their case. All will be judged according to their deeds. Hands, heads and all the limbs, even the little finger, will testify to the crimes they have committed. Everything will be made known to the Heavenly King, unless a sinner has already done penance with alms and fasting.
- (100–103) The Cross is then brought forward, and Christ displays the wounds which He suffered because of His love for humankind.

== Etymology ==
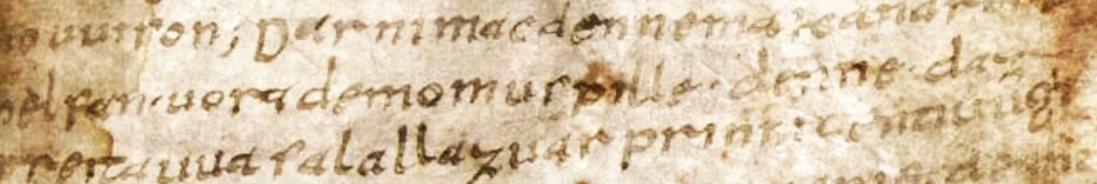
Muspilli line 57 "dar nimac denne mak andremo helfan uora demo muspille" contains Old High German hapax legomenon "muspille" that gave the poem its name (Bavarian State Library clm. 14098, folio 121 recto)

In 1832 the first editor, Johann Andreas Schmeller, proposed as the poem's provisional title what seemed to be a key word in line 57: dar nimac denne mak andremo helfan uora demo muspille ('there no kinsman is able to help another before the muspilli). (Note: demo muspille is dative singular, either masculine or neuter. Muspilli is a reconstructed nominative -ja-stem form.) This is the only known occurrence of this word in Old High German. Its immediate context is the destruction of the world by fire, but it is unclear whether the word denotes a person or some other entity. Distinctively, Kolb took uora as a local preposition ('in front of'), with muspilli signifying the Last Judgment itself, or perhaps its location or its presiding Judge. (Note: See also Finger (1977))

Related forms are found in two other Germanic languages. The Old Saxon Christian poem Heliand (early or mid 9th century) presents (and perhaps personifies) mudspelli (mutspelli) as a destructive force, coming as a thief in the night, and associated with the end of the world. In Old Norse, Muspellr occurs as a proper name, apparently that of the progenitor or leader of a band of fighters ('Muspellr's sons'), who are led by fiery Surtr against the gods at Ragnarök (a series of events heralding the death of major deities, including Odin, Thor, Týr, Freyr and Loki). The oldest known occurrences are in the Poetic Edda: Völuspá (51 Muspells lýþir) and Lokasenna (42 Muspells synir) (originals 10th century, manuscripts from about 1270). More elaborate detail on Ragnarök is supplied in the Prose Edda (attributed to Snorri Sturluson, compiled round 1220, manuscripts from about 1300), and here the section known as Gylfaginning (chapters 4, 13, and 51) has references to Muspell(i), Muspells megir, Muspells synir and Muspells heimr.

Muspilli is usually analysed as a two-part compound, with well over 20 different etymologies proposed, depending on whether the word is seen as a survival from old Germanic, pagan times, or as a newly coined Christian term originating within the German-speaking area. Only a few examples can be mentioned here. (Note: The main references are listed in the notes to section XXX of Braune & Ebbinghaus, Althochdeutsches Lesebuch. See also Laur (1987).) As possible meanings, Bostock, King and McLintock favoured 'pronouncement about (the fate of) the world' or 'destruction (or destroyer) of the earth'. Like Sperber and Krogmann, Finger argued that the word originated in Old Saxon as a synonym for Christ, 'He who slays with the word of His mouth' (as in 2 Thessalonians 2, 8 and Apocalypse 19, 15). Finger also contended that the word was imported into Norway (not Iceland) under Christian influence, and that the Old Norse texts (though themselves touched by Christianity) show no deeper understanding of its meaning. Jeske also regarded the word as a Christian coinage, deriving its first syllable from Latin mundus 'world' and -spill- (more conventionally) from a Germanic root meaning 'destruction'. (Note: Compare Old English spilð, also spillan, spildan 'to destroy' and Old Saxon spildian 'to kill'.)

Scholarly consensus on the word's origin and meaning is unsettled. There is, however, agreement that as a title, it fails to match the poem's principal theme: the fate of souls after death.

== Critical reception ==
Von Steinmeyer (1892) described the Muspilli as

this most exasperating piece of Old High German literature

a verdict frequently echoed in 20th century research. On many issues, agreement is still lacking. Its reception by scholars is significant in its own right, and as a study in evolving critical paradigms. Already by 1900, this (literally) marginal work had come to be monumentalised alongside other medieval texts against a background of German nation-building, but also in keeping with the powerful, European-wide interest in national antiquities and their philological investigation.

=== Genetic approaches: sources and parallels ===
Early researchers were keen to trace the work's theological and mythological sources, to reconstruct its antecedents and genesis, and to identify its oldest, pre-Christian elements. Apart from the Bible, no single work has come to light which could have functioned as a unique source for our poem. For Neckel Muspilli was patently a Christian poem, but with vestiges still of pagan culture. Seeking analogues, Neckel was struck, for example, by similarities between the role of Elias in our poem and the Norse god Freyr, killed by Surtr, who is linked with Muspellr and his sons.

Apocalyptic speculation was a common Hebrew-Christian heritage, and interesting parallels exist in some early Jewish pseudepigrapha. For the work's Christian elements, many correspondences have been cited from the Early Church Fathers (Greek and Latin), apocryphal writings, Sibylline Oracles, including in Book VIII the "Sibylline Acrostic" (3rd century?), (Note: This Christian acrostic, apocalyptic in content, also appears in the Pseudo-Augustinian Sermo contra Judaeos, paganos et Arianos, on folios 102r–103r of the very manuscript into which the Muspilli was entered.) and works by or attributed to Ephrem the Syrian, Bede, Adso of Montier-en-Der and others. Baesecke posited a firm relationship with the Old English Christ III. In Finger's view, the Muspilli poet probably knew and used the Old English poem.

Many of the correspondences proposed are too slight to carry conviction. Conceding that the 'hunt for parallels' was passing into discredit, Schneider was nonetheless insistent that, until all potential Christian sources had been exhausted, we should not assume that anything still left unexplained must be of pagan Germanic origin or the poet's own invention. Schneider himself saw the poem as solidly Christian, apart from the mysterious word muspille.

=== Multiple or single authorship? ===
Commentators have long been troubled by breaks in the poem's thematic sequence, especially between lines 36 and 37, where the Mighty King's summons to Final Judgment is followed by an episode in which Elias fights with the Antichrist. Guided by spelling, style and metre, Baesecke claimed that lines 37–62 (labelled by him as 'Muspilli II') had been adapted from an old poem on the destruction of the world and inserted into the main body of the work ('Muspilli I', which had another old poem as its source). Baesecke later (1948–50) linked 'Muspilli II' genetically in a highly conjectural stemma with Christ III, Heliand and other poems. Schneider rejected Baesecke's radical dissections, but still considered the work a composite, with its pristine poetic integrity repeatedly disrupted (in lines 18 ff, 63 ff, and 97 ff) by the 'mediocre' moralising of a 'garrulous preacher'.

In contrast, Gustav Ehrismann (1918) respected the work's integrity: he saw no need to assume interpolations, nor any pagan Germanic features apart from possible echoes in the word muspille. Von Steinmeyer also regarded the existing text as a unity. Though he found the transition from line 36 to 37 'hard and abrupt', he attributed it to the author's own limitations, which in his view also included poor vocabulary, monotonous phraseology, and incompetent alliterative technique.

Verdicts such as these left critics hovering somewhere between two extremes: a technically faltering composition by a single author, or a conglomerate of chronologically separate redactions of varying quality and diverse function.

The second of these approaches culminated in Minis' 1966 monograph.

Minis stripped away the sermonising passages, discarded lines containing rhymes and inferior alliteration, and assumed that small portions of text had been lost at the beginning and in the middle of the poem. These procedures left him with an 'Urtext' of 15 strophes, varying in length from 5 to 7 lines and forming a symmetrical pattern rich in number symbolism. The result of this drastic surgery was certainly a more unified work of art, alliterative in form and narrative or epic in content. But reviewers (e.g. Steinhoff, Seiffert) soon pointed out serious flaws in Minis's reasoning. Though it remains possible that the documented text was inept expansion of a well-formed, shorter original, later scholars have favoured a far more conservative treatment.

=== Identifying the work's intended purpose ===
Increasingly, the aim has been to approach the Muspilli as a complicated work that is functionally adequate, regardless of its ostensible stylistic flaws, and to interpret it in its 9th century Christian context, whilst also sharply questioning or rejecting its allegedly pagan elements. Kolb felt that to demand an unbroken narrative sequence is to misunderstand the work's pastoral function as an admonitory sermon. Publishing in 1977 views which he had formulated some 20 years earlier, Wolfgang Mohr saw older poetic material here being re-worked with interpolations, as a warning to all, but especially the rich and powerful. Haug analysed the surviving text using a new method. Characterising it as a 'montage' and a 'somewhat fortuitous' constellation, he focused on its discontinuities, its 'open form', viewing it as an expression of the fragmented order of its time, and as an invective, aimed at correcting some aspects of that fragmentation.

In a landmark dissertation of the same year, Finger saw no further need to search for survivals from pagan mythology, since even the most problematic portions of the Muspilli contain nothing that is alien to patristic thought. Equally illuminating was Finger's placement of the work against a differentiated legal background (see below).

Categorising the Muspilli as a sermon or homily, Murdoch saw in it these same two 'basic strains': theological and juridical. In recent decades the theological content has again been studied by Carola Gottzmann and Martin Kuhnert. There has also been renewed attention to sources, textual issues, and the word muspilli.

Looking back from 2009, Pakis reported on two 'peculiar trends'. Recent German literary histories either ignore the Muspilli altogether, or they 'reinstate the old bias towards mythological interpretations'. Pakis's personal plea is for a new recognition of the Muspilli in all its complexity, as 'a locus of polyvocality and interpretive tensions'

== Interpretation ==
=== Theological basis ===
As an exemplar of Christian eschatology, much of the Muspilli is theologically conventional, and remarkable mainly for its vivid presentation of Christian themes in a vernacular language at such an early date. With biblical support and backed by established dogma, the poet evidently saw no difficulty in juxtaposing the particular judgment (lines 1–30, with souls consigned immediately (sar) to Heaven or Hell) and the general judgment on the Last Day (31–36 and 50 ff). Most of the poem's Christian features are an amalgam of elements from the Bible. Key passages in the Gospels (particularly Matthew 24, 29 ff; 25, 31 ff; and Luke 21, 5 ff) predict calamities and signs, including a darkening of sun and moon, the stars falling from the heavens and a loud trumpet, followed by Christ's Second Coming and the Last Judgment. The Second Epistle of Peter, chapter 3, foretells the 'Day of the Lord' and its all-consuming fire. Many significant signs are described in 2(4) Esdras 5, and in non-canonical works such as the Apocalypse of Thomas, in a tradition later formalised as the Fifteen Signs before Doomsday.

=== Elias and the Antichrist ===
A further biblical source was the canonical Book of Revelation with its visions of monsters, battles, fire and blood. The Muspilli shows greater freedom in its handling of these elements. Chapter 11, 3ff. of the Apocalypse tells how two witnesses (Greek martyres, Latin testes), empowered by God, will be killed by a beast, but then revived by the Spirit of Life and taken up into Heaven. These witnesses were traditionally identified with Enoch (Genesis 5, 24) and Elijah (received into Heaven in 2 Kings 2, 11). The Antichrist is most closely identifiable with one or other of the beasts described in Apocalypse 13, though the term itself is used elsewhere (1 John 2, 18) to denote apostates, false Christs, whose coming will signal the 'last days'. The Muspilli makes no mention of Enoch, and so the Antichrist faces Elias in single combat. Both are presented as strong champions in a dispute of great importance(line 40). Comparisons have sometimes been made with the Old High German Hildebrandslied, which depicts in a secular setting a fatal encounter between two champions, father and son. But in the Muspilli the contest between Elias and the Antichrist is presented in much plainer terms. Opinions are divided as to whether our poet suppressed the role of Enoch in order to present the duel as a judicially significant ordeal by combat. (Note: Schneider (1936), Kolb (1964) Mohr & Haug, and Groos & Hill saw the contest in these terms. Arguments to the contrary were produced by Finger.)

=== Two opposing views? ===
Lines 37–49 are often understood as reflecting two opposing contemporary views. In this reading, the uueroltrehtuuîson ('men wise in worldly law'?) expect Elias to prevail in this judicial contest, since he has God's support. And unlike the beast of the biblical Apocalypse, which temporarily kills God's two witnesses, the Antichrist (with Satan at his side) will be brought down and denied victory. compared this outcome with a Christianised Coptic version of the Apocalypse of Elijah, in which Elijah and Enoch kill a figure posing as Christ ('the Shameless One', 'the Son of Lawlessness') in a second contest, following the Last Judgment. Different again is a reference in Tertullian's De anima (early 3rd century), where Enoch and Elijah are martyred by the Antichrist, who is then 'destroyed by their blood' However, our poet continues, (many?) gotmann- ('men of God', 'theologians'?) believe that Elias will be wounded (or slain?) (the verb aruuartit is ambiguous). In Kolb's interpretation, it is Elias's defeat which makes the final conflagration inevitable. preferred the reading 'wounded' and saw nothing contrary to apocalyptic tradition in this encounter, though references to Enoch and Elijah as victors are very unusual. Perhaps the poet was deliberately using ambiguity to accommodate a range of opinions. But the obscure three-part compound uueroltrehtuuîson has also been glossed as 'people of the right faith' or 'learned men' – in which case no polar opposition between them and the 'men of God' is implied here.

=== Elias's blood ===
Another troublesome issue was eventually resolved. The traditional reading of lines 48–51 was that Elias's blood, dripping down onto the earth, would directly set it aflame. For decades, scholars could only point to geographically and chronologically distant parallels in Russian texts and folklore; this evidence was re-examined by Kolb. As the manuscript is defective at this point, Bostock, King, & McLintock suggested a syntactic break between lines 50 and 51, which 'would remove the non-biblical notion that the fire is immediately consequent upon, or even caused by, the shedding of Elias' blood.' That causal connection was also dismissed by Kolb and Finger, but affirmed by Mohr & Haug. Good support for a firm linkage came at last in 1980 from Groos and Hill, who reported on a close Christian analogue, hitherto unknown, from an 8th century Spanish formulary, predicting that on Judgment Day an all-consuming flame will rise up from the blood of Enoch and Elijah.

=== Legal aspects ===
Describing Judgment Day, the poet used terms and concepts drawn from secular law. Some examples are highlighted in the Synopsis, above. Most strikingly, the King of Heaven issues His summons (kipannit daz mahal), using a technical expression rooted in Germanic law, but relevant also to contemporary politics. Comparisons have also been made with the roles of co-jurors and champions as laid down in the Lex Baiuwariorum, an 8th century collection of laws:

Et si maior pecunia furata fuerit, ... et negare voluerit, cum XII sacramentalibus iuret de leuda sua, vel duo campiones propter hoc pugnent

[And if a larger sum of money shall have been stolen, ... and if he wishes to deny the accusation, let him take an oath in company with twelve others from his people, or let two champions fight together on that account]

According to Kolb, the poet aimed to prevent listeners from approaching God's Judgment with expectations derived from secular law, informing them that the King of Heaven's summons cannot be ignored, that the Heavenly Judge is incorruptible, and that bribery is itself a sin which must be revealed on Judgment Day. In Kolb's view, the difference between earthly and Heavenly justice was most explicitly stated in line 57:

your kinsfolk may give you legal support as oath-helpers in this world, but they are powerless to help you before the muspilli

Rejecting this interpretation, Finger saw no legal implications whatever in this line: Bavarian legal sources offer no proof of regular oath-taking by kinsmen, and in the passage quoted above, leuda (a Frankish form) means 'tribe' or 'people' (not precisely 'kin').

Lines 63–72 are directly critical of the judiciary, specifically the taking of bribes. (Note: The wording here closely matches the Capitulare missorum generale (Charlemagne's instructions to his itinerant magistrates). iustum iudicium marrire = marrit daz rehta ≈ 'disrupts (impedes? falsifies?) the law' (Muspilli) On this parallel and its historical context, see Finger.) Corrupt judges were frequently censured, and there was much pressure for judicial reform. The Muspilli emerges from Finger's study as strongly partisan polemic, critical of popular law as practised in county courts (Grafsgerichte), and supportive of Carolingian legal reforms, to the extent of using concepts and terms typical of Frankish royal court procedures in its depiction of the Last Judgment. Finger concluded that the author was probably a cleric in Louis the German's entourage.

Murdoch placed the emphasis differently. Though the Muspilli seems to be 'directed toward the noblemen who would be entrusted with the business of law', the work's legal significance should not be exaggerated. A corrupt judiciary was not the author's main target, despite his pointed criticism. His true concerns lay elsewhere, in warning all mortals of the 'absolute necessity of right behavior on earth'.

=== The lost ending ===
The poem is starkly dualistic, dominated by antagonisms: God and Satan, angels and devils, Heaven and Hell, Elias and the Antichrist. Our text breaks off in narrative mode, on a seemingly conciliatory note: Preceded by the Cross, Christ displays at this Second Coming His stigmata, the bodily wounds which He suffered for love of humankind. For Minis, renaming his reconstructed 'original' as 'The Way to Eternal Salvation', this climactic vision was closure enough. Through Christ's sacrifice, Divine justice gives penitents hope for mercy. But in many accounts the sight of the Cross and of Christ's wounds also had a negative effect, as a terrible reminder to sinners of their ingratitude. In any case, the outcome of the Final Judgment has yet to be depicted. The 'tension between the roles of Christ as Judge and as Saviour has surely reached its climax, but not yet its dénouement and resolution'. We should not assume that in the lost ending the poet moderated his awesome narrative, nor that the moralising commentator withheld an uncompromisingly didactic conclusion.

== Muspilli in literature, music and film ==
Muspilli was used for the title of a 1900 novel. Muspilli is here invoked as a destructive fire, along with motifs from Germanic mythology such as Loki and the Midgard serpent.

Since the 1970s, the Muspilli has been set to music as a sacred work. Its apocalyptic theme and mythological associations have also won it something of a following in modern popular culture.

=== Musical compositions ===
- Muspilli (1978) for baritone and instrumental accompaniment, by the German composer Wilfried Hiller (born 1941).
- Muspilli (1994) for mixed choir and organ, by Dietmar Bonnen (born 1958).
- Muspilli (2002), oratorio for solo voices, instruments, choir, orchestra and tape, by Leopold Hurt, commissioned by the Regensburg Philharmonic Orchestra.
- Muspilli Spezial. 9 Versionen des Weltuntergangs.
- Fragments for the End of Time – Endzeitfragmente, performed by Sequentia: Ensemble for Medieval Music, directed by Benjamin Bagby. Together with other apocalyptic fragments, this work uses most of the extant text of Muspilli, translated into English by Benjamin Bagby (Schola Cantorum Basiliensis) based on Koch's edition. A recording was made on CD in 2007 in the Klosterkirche Walberberg (with Bagby as vocalist & harper and Norbert Rodenkirchen as flautist); it was released in 2008 by Raumklang (RK 2803) in co-production with WDR Köln.
- Mathias Monrad Møller's Fünf Muspilli-räume (2009) is an experimental work for 5 voices, by a young composer from Schleswig-Holstein.

=== Other arts ===
- 1977: Early in his 7-hour film, Hitler: a film from Germany, Hans-Jürgen Syberberg's narrator quotes from the text, punctuating a lengthy lead in to an early recording of Hitler holding forth. After the words "Muspilli. World's end, in the ancient way", a brief passage is quoted in Old High German, followed by a loose translation.
- Kulturverein Muspilli Tanztheater & Musik in Merano, South Tirol, active since 1992.
- 'Muspilli', a track in the album by the German folk-rock band Nachtgeschrei.
- Muspilli II, translated and dramatized by Tokarski is described as 'a sort of Christian yet heathen-toned Dark Age storymyth embedded into the body of the Old High German alliterative lay 'The Muspilli'.'

== Critical editions ==
- Schmeller, Johann Andreas (ed.) (1832). Muspilli. Bruchstück einer alliterierenden Dichtung vom Ende der Welt. Munich: Jaquet
- Müllenhoff, Karl & Wilhelm Scherer (eds.) (1892/1964). Denkmäler deutscher Poesie und Prosa aus dem VIII–XII Jahrhundert. 3rd edition (revised by Elias Steinmeyer). Berlin: Weidmann, 1892. 4th edition. Berlin, Zürich: Weidmann, 1964. Vol. I, pp. 7–15; vol. II, pp. 30–41
- Steinmeyer, Elias von (ed.) (1916). Die kleineren althochdeutschen Sprachdenkmäler. Berlin: Weidmann, 1916. 2nd edition. Berlin, Zürich: Weidmann, 1963. pp. 66–81
- Braune, Wilhelm (1994). Althochdeutsches Lesebuch. 17th edition revised by Ernst A. Ebbinghaus. Tübingen: Niemeyer. ISBN 3-484-10708-1. Section XXX, pp. 86–89

== Bibliography ==
- Baesecke, Georg (1948–1950). 'Muspilli II', Zeitschrift für deutsches Altertum 82, 199–239
- Bergmann, Rolf (1971). 'Zum Problem der Sprache des Muspilli ', Frühmittelalterliche Studien 5, 304–315
- Bostock, J. Knight (1976). A Handbook on Old High German Literature. 2nd edition revised by K. C. King and D. R. McLintock. Oxford: Clarendon Press. ISBN 0-19-815392-9. pp. 135–154
- Finger, Heinz (1977). Untersuchungen zum "Muspilli". (Göppinger Arbeiten zur Germanistik, 244.) Göppingen: Kümmerle. ISBN 3-87452-400-0
- Geuenich, Dieter (2008). 'Bemerkungen zum althochdeutschen "Muspilli"', in Siegfried Schmidt (ed.). Rheinisch, Kölnisch, Katholisch. Beiträge zur Kirchen- und Landesgeschichte sowie zur Geschichte des Buch- und Bibliothekswesens der Rheinlande. Festschrift für Heinz Finger zum 60. Geburtstag. Cologne: Erzbischöfliche Diözesan- und Dombibliothek. ISBN 978-3-939160-13-7. pp. 443–450
- Groos, Arthur & Thomas D. Hill (1980). 'The blood of Elias and the Fire of Doom. A New Analogue for Muspilli, vss. 52ff.', Neuphilologische Mitteilungen 81, 439–442
- Hellgardt, Ernst (2013). 'Muspilli', in Rolf Bergmann (ed.). Althochdeutsche und altsächsische Literatur. Berlin, Boston: De Gruyter. ISBN 978-3-11-024549-3. pp. 288–292
- Jeske, Hans (2006). 'Zur Etymologie des Wortes muspilli ', Zeitschrift für deutsches Altertum 135, 425–434
- Kolb, Herbert (1962). ' dia weroltrehtwîson ', Zeitschrift für deutsche Wortforschung 18, Neue Folge 3, 88–95
- Kolb, Herbert (1964). ' Vora demo muspille. Versuch einer Interpretation', Zeitschrift für deutsche Philologie 83, 2–33
- Minis, Cola (1966). Handschrift, Form und Sprache des Muspilli. (Philologische Studien und Quellen, 35.) Berlin: Erich Schmidt
- Mohr, Wolfgang & Walter Haug (1977). Zweimal 'Muspilli'. Tübingen: Niemeyer. ISBN 3-484-10283-7 (with text and translation into modern German)
- Murdoch, Brian O. (1983). Old High German Literature. Boston: Twayne. ISBN 0-8057-6535-2. pp. 68–72
- Pakis, Valentine A. (2009). 'The literary status of Muspilli in the history of scholarship: two peculiar trends', Amsterdamer Beiträge zur älteren Germanistik 65, 41–60
- Schneider, Hermann (1936). 'Muspilli', Zeitschrift für deutsches Altertum 73, 1–32
- Schützeichel, Rudolf (1988). 'Zum Muspilli', in Peter K. Stein et al. (eds.). Festschrift für Ingo Reiffenstein zum 60. Geburtstag. (Göppinger Arbeiten zur Germanistik, 478.) Göppingen, Kümmerle. ISBN 3-87452-714-X. pp. 15–30
- Seiffert, Leslie (1969). Review of Minis (1966), Modern Language Review 64, 206–208
- Staiti, Chiara (2002). 'Muspilli', in Johannes Hoops (ed.). Reallexikon der Germanischen Altertumskunde. 2nd edition. Edited by Heinrich Beck et al. Vol. 20. Berlin, New York: Walter de Gruyter. ISBN 3-11-017164-3. pp. 433–438
- Steinhoff, Hans-Hugo (1968). Review of Minis (1966), Zeitschrift für deutsches Altertum 97, 5–12
- Steinhoff, Hans-Hugo (1987). 'Muspilli', in Kurt Ruh et al. (eds.). Die deutsche Literatur des Mittelalters. Verfasserlexikon. 2nd edition. Vol. 6. Berlin, New York: Walter de Gruyter. ISBN 978-3-11-022248-7. cols. 821–828
