= Bernhard Seuffert =

German-Austrian philologist

Bernhard Seuffert (23 May 1853, in Würzburg – 15 May 1938, in Graz) was a German-Austrian philologist, specializing in German studies.

From 1871 he studied classical philology, history and German studies at the University of Würzburg, and afterwards continued his education at Strasbourg as a student of Wilhelm Scherer, Elias von Steinmeyer and Wilhelm Studemund. In 1877 he obtained his habilitation, and subsequently replaced Erich Schmidt as a lecturer at Würzburg. In 1886, he became an associate professor at the University of Graz, where from 1892 to 1924 he worked as a full professor of German philology. In 1913/14 he served as university rector.

In collaboration with Erich Schmidt and Bernhard Ludwig Suphan, he was editor of the Vierteljahrschrift für litteraturgeschichte ("Quarterly edition for literary history"; 1888–93).

== Selected works ==
- Maler Müller, 1877 – On the painter Friedrich Müller.
- Die Legende von der Pfalzgräfin Genovefa, 1877 – The legend of the Palatinate countess Genevieve.
- Wielands Abderiten, 1878 – Christoph Martin Wieland's Abderites.
- Deutsche Litteraturdenkmale des 18. und 19. Jahrhunderts (with August Sauer; multi-volume, 1881–1924) – German literature monuments of the 18th and 19th centuries.
- Frankfurter gelehrte Anzeigen vom Jahr 1772 (with Wilhelm Scherer; 2 volumes 1882–83) – Frankfurt scholarly notices from the year 1772.
- Voltaire am abend seiner apotheose, 1881 – Voltaire in the evening of his apotheosis.
- Der Dichter des Oberon, 1900 – The writer of Oberon.
- Philologische Betrachtungen im Anschluss an Goethes Werther, 1900 – Philological considerations on Goethe's Werther.
- Prolegomena zu einer Wieland Ausgabe (4 volumes, 1904–09) – Prolegomena to a Christoph Martin Wieland edition.
