= Der Busant =

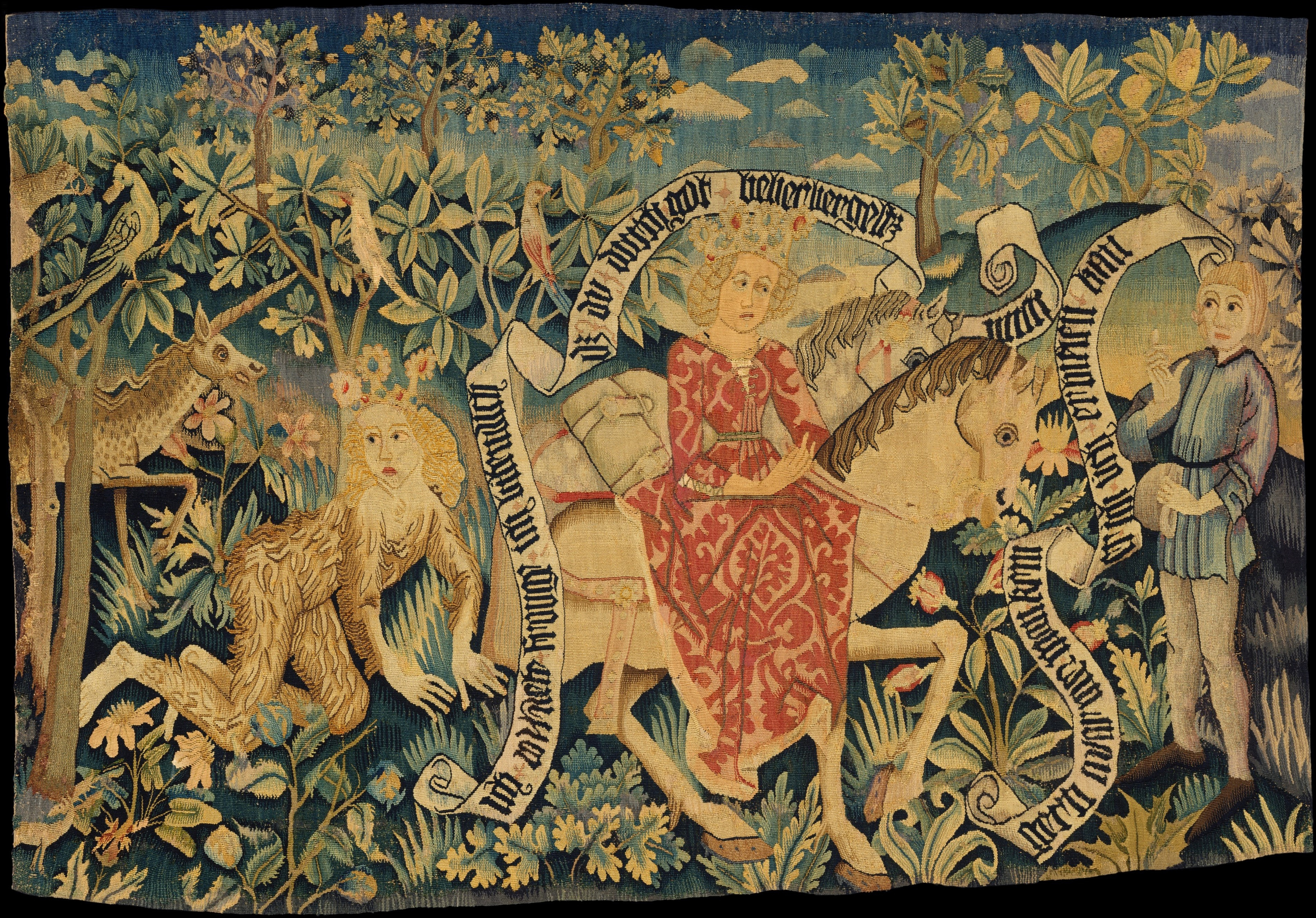
Tapestry from Alsace depicting two scenes from the poem (1480–90)

Der Busant, also known as Der Bussard (both German names for the common buzzard), is a Middle High German verse narrative, containing 1074 lines of rhyming couplets. The story tells of a love affair between the Princess of France and the Prince of England, who elope but are separated after a buzzard steals one of the princess's rings. After more than a year of separation, with the prince having gone mad and living as a wild man, they are reunited.

Known from a single fifteenth-century manuscript and three fragments, Der Busant emerged from a thematic tradition of wild men, thieving birds, and adventures of separated lovers. It is close to several other contemporary stories, such that a common origin has been hypothesised. The work has been described as a novel-like example of the Märe style of poetry. Cultural impact of the poem is visible in several surviving tapestries, as well as a possible influence in William Shakespeare's A Midsummer Night's Dream.

== Contents ==
The Princess of France is engaged to the King of Morocco in an unwanted political marriage. To rescue her, the Prince of England (then studying in Paris) disguises himself, sneaks into the castle, and finds her. The two then elope. While she is sleeping in a forest, he admires two of her rings. Suddenly, a buzzard flies by and steals one of them. The prince follows the bird but gets lost in the woods and loses his mind from grief.

The prince lives for a year as a wild man. In the meantime, the princess has taken refuge in a mill and makes a living sewing, waiting all the time for her lover's return. She is taken in, unrecognized, by the prince's uncle (a duke) and aunt, who had become interested in the origin of the fine needlework and, after taking one look at the princess, recognizes her nobility. One day the duke is out hunting and captures the wild prince, whom he takes back to the castle and attempts for six weeks to cure.

When the prince is about to prove his noble upbringing during a hunt for falcons, he captures a buzzard and to everyone's surprise bites its head off. When he explains his actions, he recounts his story, and the princess is able to recognise him. (Note: A common method: "narration by a character of her life story as a device to bring about a recognition".) The two then live happily ever after.

== Manuscript and fragments ==
The poem survives in its entirety in one fifteenth-century manuscript, and there are three additional fragments. The manuscript is preserved in the State and University Library of Bremen, MS B.42^{b}, which, according to Hans-Friedrich Rosenfeld, is "poorly and randomly corrected" (schlecht und willkürlich korrigiert). The three fragments are in State Archive of the Russian Federation, cod. 1432; Baden State Library cod. St. Georg 86; and in the private collection of August Closs, formerly owned by Baden State Library.

Sandra Linden, following Rosenfeld and Reinhold Köhler, dates the work to the early fourteenth century. The manuscript contains 172 double-sided sheets of cotton paper; a copy of the work of the thirteenth-century Swabian poet Freidank takes up most of the first half of the manuscript. Each page contains 24 lines; initials such as chapter titles and initial capitals are in red. The manuscript is bound with two parchment deeds serving as covers (one of them dated to 1403; the heavily damaged other, a deed of sale pertaining to a house in Basel, is older); the deeds prove that the manuscript was bound and held for a long time in Switzerland.

Meyer and Mooyer, who published the contents of the manuscript in 1833, comment that the copier and compiler seemed to have organized his materials haphazardly and all-too freely (even carelessly) adapted spelling to his own taste; a sixteenth-century editor corrected many errors in the manuscript's margins. Still, many lines appear to be missing and others make little sense. The manuscript was long thought lost, until it was rediscovered in the city library of Bremen. How it got there from Switzerland is unknown. A page is retained in the fragment of a collection c. 1380, written on paper in the Alsace and edited by Robert Priebsch; the fragment was in the collection of August Closs, which was bequeathed to the Institute of Germanic and Romance Studies. Modern scholars of the poem cite it from Friedrich Heinrich von der Hagen's Hundert altdeutsche Erzählungen (1850; republished 1961); a new edition was announced as part of a project by the Deutsche Forschungsgemeinschaft, Edition und Kommentierung der deutschen Versnovellistik des 13. und 14. Jahrhunderts.

== Thematic background ==
Central to the plot of the poem is the theme of the buzzard (or other bird of prey) who swoops down from the skies to steal a lady's ring, prompting her knight to go and find the ring again. The lovers are thus separated for a while, and the knight is given the opportunity for adventure before they are reunited. A popular theme in literature probably deriving from the One Thousand and One Nights material, it first appears in Western literature in Guillaume d'Angleterre and is in use still, as evidenced in Peter Bichsel's "Der Busant" (1998), a story also involving loss of identity. This theme is to be distinguished from what folklorist Gordon Hall Gerould called "the motive of the man tried by fate", since the main character in such stories (Gerould categorizes them as following the Saint Eustace motif) experiences separation from society for different (usually religious) reasons.

Among contemporary texts, Der Busant shares the theme of a treasure being stolen by a bird with several other works. This includes L'Escoufle by Jean Renart (twelfth or thirteenth century), a chivalric romance 1902 lines long in which a kite performs the same action, as well as the Italian La storia di Ottinello e Giulia, the French La belle histoire d'amour de Pierre de Provence et de la belle Maguelonne, fille du roi de Naples, and a story from the One Thousand and One Nights, "Tale of Kamar al-Zaman". Paul Meyer compared Der Busant and L'Escoufle and suggests that the two were derived from a single source, yet to be found; the comparison was first made by Köhler, and according to Rosenfeld, later cited by Linden, that original is a French text. Ph. Aug. Becker, however, in a 1937 review of a study of Renart, denies such a source text and claims the theme as Renart's own invention. According to Rosenfeld, style and individual motifs suggest that the fourteenth-century original of the poem was influenced by Konrad von Würzburg (he singles out his Partonopier); the elopement is, he says, influenced by Rudolf von Ems's Wilhelm von Orlens, and the depiction of the Prince's madness by Hartmann von Aue's Iwein.

The general theme of a man becoming wild, evident in the Prince's transformations, is likewise an old one: it dates back to the eleventh century, with twelfth-century figures such as Merlin, Tristan, Renaud de Montauban, and Orson also undergoing such a temporary transformation.

The prince's descent into madness is conventional in many ways. Typical for this kind of narrative poem, according to Linden, is the opposition between culture and nature, and the prince's madness follows a conventional plot: he moves away from culture and into the moral and physical wilderness (Gewilde) of the forest, where chaos reigns; as he does so, he loses, one by one, the qualities which characterize him as a human of high birth—by scratching and hitting himself he destroys his beauty, he tears his clothes off, and finally he begins walking on all fours. He shares this particular development toward insanity with such characters as Ywain and Lancelot. According to John Twyning, this descent into madness in Der Busant inspired the plot in which four lovers are lost in the woods in William Shakespeare's A Midsummer Night's Dream; he describes the latter as an intended "riff" on the German poem.

The poem used to be considered a novel-like example of the Märe (in German), which is a German style of narrative poem, typically between 150 and 2000 lines, usually dealing with profane matters such as love; some critics discern three different types—farcical, courtly, and didactic. Der Busant partakes of the French tradition of Die schöne Magelone (in German), but also shows affinity with the work of Konrad von Würzburg and the Iwein.

== Tapestries ==
Numerous depictions of the poem were produced, including a long piece of tapestry with fragments now held in the Metropolitan Museum of Art in New York, Museum für Angewandte Kunst in Cologne, the Victoria and Albert Museum in London, the Germanisches Nationalmuseum in Nuremberg, and in Paris. The Metropolitan piece shows the Prince of England as a wild man, whilst the Princess of France, mounted on her palfrey, finds refuge with a poor man. According to Jennifer Eileen Floyd, the existence of such tapestries is evidence of a bourgeois market for hangings and tapestries that depicted, amongst other things, the hunt; such hangings were not only within the reach of nobles, but also rich merchants and gentry.

== See also ==
- Bal des Ardents
