= List of kennings =

A kenning (Old English kenning [cʰɛnːiŋɡ], Modern Icelandic [cʰɛnːiŋk]) is a circumlocution, an ambiguous or roundabout figure of speech, used instead of an ordinary noun in Old Norse, Old English, and later Icelandic poetry.

This list is not intended to be comprehensive. Kennings for a particular character are listed in that character's article. For example, the Odin article links to a list of names of Odin, which include kennings. A few examples of Odin's kennings are given here. For a scholarly list of kennings see Rudolf Meissner's Die Kenningar der Skalden (1921) below or some editions of Snorri Sturluson's Skáldskaparmál.

== Source language abbreviations ==
- OE – Old English
- D – Danish
- G – Germanic
- Ic – Old Icelandic
- N – Norse
- ON – Old Norse
- S – Swedish

== List of kennings ==
Primary meaning	Kenning translated	Original kenning	Explanation	Source language	Example
axe	blood-ember	Blóðeisu		N	Einarr Skúlason, Øxarflokkr 7
battle	spear-din			N	Snorri Sturluson, Skaldskaparmal
blood	dead-slave			N	
blood	battle-sweat		One reference for this kenning comes from the epic poem, Beowulf. As Beowulf is in fierce combat with Grendel's mother, he makes mention of shedding much battle-sweat.	N	Beowulf
blood	wound-sea	svarraði sárgymir		N	Eyvindr Skillir, Hákonarmál 7.
chieftain or king	breaker of rings		Alludes to a ruler breaking the golden rings upon his arm and using them to reward his followers.	OE	Beowulf
death	sleep of the sword			OE	Beowulf
death	flame-farewelled		An implicitly honorable death.	N	
fire	bane of wood	grand viðar		ON	Snorri Sturluson, Skáldskaparmál 36
fire	sun of the houses	sól húsanna		ON	Snorri Sturluson, Skáldskaparmál 36
gold	seeds of the Fyris Wolds	Fýrisvalla fræ	Hrólf Kraki spread gold on the Fyris Wolds to distract the men of the Swedish king.	N	Eyvindr Skáldaspillir, Lausavísa 8
gold	serpent's lair		Serpents (and dragons) were reputed to lie upon gold in their nests.	N	Skáldskaparmál
gold	Sif's hair		Derived from the story of when Loki cut off Sif's hair. In order to make amends for his crime, Loki had the dwarf Dvalin make new hair for Sif, a wig of gold that grew like normal hair.	N	Skáldskaparmál
gold	Kraki's seed		Hrólf Kraki spread gold on the Fyris Wolds to distract the men of the Swedish king. Can also be used to imply generosity; q.v. Hrólf Kraki.	N	Skáldskaparmál
gold, sometimes amber	Freyja's tears		Derived from the story of when Freyja could not find Óðr, her husband, the tears she shed were gold, and the trees which her tears fell upon were transmuted into amber.	N	
Harald Fairhair	lord of the northmen	dróttin Norðmanna		ON	Þorbjörn Hornklofi, Hrafnsmál
honour	mind's worth	weorðmyndum		OE	Beowulf
hook	bait-gallows			Ic	Flateyjarbók
kill enemies	Feed the eagle		Killing enemies left food for the eagles.	S	Gripsholm Runestone
Loki	wolf's father		An allusion to Loki's fathering of Fenrir.	N	Lokasenna
Loki	father of the sea thread		Loki was the father of Jörmungandr, the Midgard serpent.	N	Þórsdrápa
mistletoe	Baldr's bane		The kenning derives from the story in which all plants and creatures swore never to harm Baldr save mistletoe, which, when it was overlooked, Loki used to bring about Baldr's death by tricking Hodur.	N	
Mjollnir, Thor's hammer	Hrungnir's slayer		Hrungnir was a giant whose head was smashed by a blow from Mjollnir.	N	Lokasenna
Odin	Lord of the gallows		See the separate page List of names of Odin for more Odin kennings.	N	
Odin	Hanged god		Odin hung on the Tree of Knowledge for nine days in order to gain wisdom.	N	
person	voice-bearer	reordberend		OE	Dream of the Rood
poetry	Grímnir's lip-streams		Grímnir is one of the names of Odin.	N	Þórsdrápa
raven	swan of blood		Ravens ate the dead at battlefields.	N	
the sea	whale-road	hron-rād		N,OE	Beowulf 10: "In the end, each clan on the outlying coasts beyond the whale-road had to yield to him and begin to pay tribute"
the sea	sail road	seġl-rād		OE	Beowulf 1429 b
the sea	whale's way	hwæl-weġ		N,OE	The Seafarer 63 a; Beowulf
serpent	valley-trout			N	Skaldskaparmal
shield	headland of swords	sverða nesi	There is a connection to the word nesa meaning subject to public ridicule/failure/shame, i.e. "the failure/shame of swords", not only "where the sword first hits/ headland of swords" Kennings can sometimes be a triple entendre.	N	Þorbjörn Hornklofi, Glymdrápa 3
shield	battle-linden		Shields were often constructed from this sturdy wood		
ship	wave-swine	unnsvín		N	
ship	sea-steed	gjálfr-marr		N	Hervararkviða 27; Skáldskaparmál
sky	Ymir's skull	Ymis haus	According to one of the creation accounts, sky was created from the skull of Ymir, the ancestor of all jötnar.	N	Arnórr jarlaskáld, Magnúsdrápa 19
the sun	heaven-candle	heofon-candel		OE	Exodus 115 b
the sun	heaven's jewel	heofones ġim		OE	The Phoenix 183
the sun	glory of elves	álf röðull	álf röðull (alfrodull), meaning "glory-of-elves" refers both to the chariot of the sun goddess Sól and to the rider (the sun herself).	N	Skírnismál, Vafþrúðnismál
sword	blood-worm			N	
sword	icicle of blood			N	
sword	wound-hoe	ben-grefill		N	Egill Skallagrímsson, Höfuðlausn 8
sword	leek of battle	ímun-laukr		N	Eyvindr Skáldaspillir, Lausavísa 8
Thor	slayer of giants	felli fjörnets goða flugstalla	felli fjörnets goða flugstalla is a compound kenning. Literally feller of the life webs (fjörnets) of the gods of the flight-edges, i.e. slayer of giants, life webs (fjörnets) is a kenning in its own right since it refers directly to the operations of the Norns in severing lives, flight-edges (flugstalla) being the high and dangerous places inhabited by eagles and hawks, i.e. the icy mountains of Jotunheim.	N	Þórsdrápa
war	weather of weapons			N	Skaldskaparmal
warrior	feeder of ravens	grennir gunn-más	"feeder of war-gull" = "feeder of raven" = "warrior" Ravens feed on dead bodies left after a battle.	N	Þorbjörn Hornklofi, Glymdrápa
warrior	destroyers of eagle's hunger	eyðendr arnar hungrs	"destroyers of eagle's hunger" = "feeders of eagle" = "warrior" Eagles, also, feed on dead bodies left after a battle.	N	Þorbjörn Þakkaskáld, Erlingsdrápa 1
waves	Ægir's daughters		Ægir had nine daughters called billow maidens who were personifications of the waves.	N	
wind	breaker of trees			N	
wolf	Gunnr's horse		Gunnr is a valkyrie.	S	Rök Stone

== Sources on kennings ==
- Rankin, James Walter (1909). A study of the kennings in Anglo-Saxon poetry. The Journal of English and Germanic Philology, 8(3), 357–422.
- Marold, E. (2012). The aesthetic function of the kenning. Skaldic Poetry of the Scandinavian Middle Ages, 1, lxxv-lxxxv.
- Lindow, J. (1975). Riddles, kennings, and the complexity of skaldic poetry. Scandinavian Studies, 47(3), 311–327.
- Wills, T. (2021). Kennings and variability: Corpus and structural views. European Journal of Scandinavian Studies, 51(1), 11–25.
- Fulk, R. D. (2021). Kennings in Old English verse and in the poetic edda. European Journal of Scandinavian Studies, 51(1), 69–91.
- Scholtz, M. (1927). The Kenning in Anglo-Saxon and Old Norse Poetry. NV Dekker & Van de Vegt en JW Van Leeuwen.
- Mohr, Wolfgang (1933). Kenningstudien. Beiträge zur Stilgeschichte der altgermanischen Dichtung. Stuttgart: W. Kohlhammer.
- Meissner, Rudolf (1921). Die Kenningar der Skalden: Ein Beitrag zur skaldischen Poetik. Rheinische Beiträge und Hülfsbücher zur germanischen Philologie und Volkskunde 1. Bonn and Leipzig: Schroeder. Rpt. 1984. Hildesheim etc.: Olms.
- Bode, W. (1886). Die Kenningar in der angelsächsischen Dichtung. Mit Ausblicken auf andere Litteraturen. Darmstadt and Leipzig: Eduard Zernin.
- Malone, Kemp (1928) “The Kenning in ‘Beowulf’ 2220.” The Journal of English and Germanic Philology, vol. 27, no. 3, pp. 318–24.

== External sources ==
- Meissner, Rudolf (1921). Die Kenningar der Skalden: Ein Beitrag zur skaldischen Poetik. Rheinische Beiträge und Hülfsbücher zur germanischen Philologie und Volkskunde 1. Bonn and Leipzig: Schroeder. Rpt. 1984. https://rafhladan.is/bitstream/handle/10802/4985/kenningar.pdf
