= Milan Ćurčin =

Serbian writer (1880–1960)

Milan Ćurčin (Serbian Cyrillic: Милан Ћурчин, 14 November 1880, Pančevo – 20 January 1960, Zagreb) was a Serbian poet, essayist, editor of the well-known Nova Evropa magazine and one of the founders of the Yugoslav PEN center in 1926.

== Biography ==
Milan Ćurčin was the son of a prosperous merchant's family from Pančevo, Austria-Hungary. He attended the primary school in Pančevo and continued his education at the gymnasium in Novi Sad, where he graduated with maturity diploma. In 1899, he began studying German studies at the Viennese University under Richard Heinzel and Jakob Minor. In Vienna he met Ivan Meštrović for the first time, who became the most important friend of his life. Ćurčin was the author of one of the first monographs on the sculptor, published in 1919 (English edition) and in 1933 (Serbo-Croatian edition). In 1904, he finished his studies with the doctoral thesis Das serbische Volkslied in der deutschen Literatur (The Serbian Folk Ballad in German Literature) which has been published a year later as a book edition. Since more than a hundred years, this publication of German studies is still regarded as basic work on the reciprocal relations between Serbian and German literary history. In 1906, he lectured on German language and literature at the University of Belgrade. One year later, the young lecturer was appointed associate professor who taught at the university until 1914. After the outbreak of War in Serbia, he became an officer in the medical corps of the Royal Serbian Army and organized the facilities for the care of wounded soldiers. During the war he was sent to London to coordinate the medical aid for Serbia with the Yugoslav Committee and some organizations such as Scottish Women's Hospitals for Foreign Service. After the war, he lived in Zagreb and edited the periodical Nova Evropa (New Europe) since 1920. In 1941, the publication of the magazine had to be discontinued by order of the Ustaše authorities of the Independent State of Croatia. Ćurčin left Zagreb and went to Split. He lived there in Meštrović's house until 1947. In the 1950s he was a temporary member of the editorial-staff of the Yugoslav Encyclopedia, edited by the Yugoslav Lexicographical Institute (Jugoslavenski leksikografski zavod) of the SFR Yugoslavia. He died in Zagreb and was buried in Pančevo.

== Nova Evropa Magazine (1920–1941) ==
The first issue of the magazine was published by Milan Ćurčin in 1920. He was the editor-in-chief and the owner of the same named publishing house. The model of the periodical was the British magazine The New Europe which was founded by Robert William Seton-Watson. Ćurćin's editorial programme was the promotion of European cosmopolitanism and liberalism as fundamental principles of the idea of integrative Yugoslavism. The magazine contained articles on European and Yugoslav policy, economy, history, literature, art and education. Among the authors were national and international personalities such as Juraj Andrassy, Victor Bérard, Miloš Crnjanski, Slobodan Jovanović, Miroslav Krleža, Tomáš Garrigue Masaryk, Ivo Pilar, Isidora Sekulić, Robert William Seton-Watson, Dinko Šimunović, Savić Marković Štedimlija, Milan Stojadinović, Josef Strzygowski and Dušan Vuksan as well as many other intellectuals and artists of that time. The publication of the magazine had to be discontinued in 1941 due to political changes in the Balkans. The magazine was one of the most important periodicals of its kind in Yugoslavia during the interwar period.

== Bibliography (selection) ==
Poetry

- Pesme (Poems), Belgrade 1906.
- Druge pesme (Other Poems), Belgrade 1912.
- Sabrane pesme (Collected Poems), Pančevo 1991.

Scientific publications

- Das serbische Volkslied in der deutschen Literatur, Leipzig 1905.
- Nemačka romantika (German Romanticism), Belgrade 1906.
- Gete i gospođa Stajn (Goethe and Madam Stein), Belgrade 1908.
- British Women in Serbia and the War, London 1919.
- Ivan Mestrović - A Monograph, London 1919.
- Pančevo kao kulturno sedište (Pančevo as a Cultural Place), Pančevo 1938.

Translation

- Friedrich Nietzsche, Tako je govorio Zaratustra. Knjiga za svakog, i ni za koga (Thus Spoke Zarathustra. A Book for All and None), Belgrade 1914.

Essays

- Jugoslovenska umetnička izložba u Londonu (The Yugoslav Art Exhibition in London), Nova Evropa, Zagreb 1931.
- Proslava Geteove stogodišnjice, u Nemačkoj i u ostalo Evropi (The Centenary of Goethe's Death, in Germany and the Rest of Europe), Nova Evropa, Zagreb 1932.
- Mladi Gete kao prevodila Hasanaginice (The young Goethe as Translator of the Hasanaginica), Nova Evropa, Zagreb 1932.
