= Rudolf Henning =

German philologist (1852–1930)

- Born: 30 May 1852; Kirchdorf, Germany
- Died: 7 October 1930 (aged 78); Heidelberg, Germany

Academic background
- Education: University of Strasbourg
- Doctoral advisor: Wilhelm Scherer
- Other advisors: Bernhard Egidius Konrad ten Brink; Karl Müllenhoff

Academic work
- Discipline: Germanic philology
- Sub-discipline: German philology; Old Norse philology
- Institutions: University of Strasbourg
- Main interests: Early Germanic literature; German literature

Rudolf Henning (30 May 1852 – 7 October 1930) was a German philologist who specialized in Germanic studies.

== Biography ==
Rudolf Henning was born in Kirchdorf, Germany on 30 May 1852. Since 1870, Henning studied classical and German philology at the universities of Bonn, Vienna and Strasbourg. At Strasbourg, Henning studied English philology under Bernhard Egidius Konrad ten Brink. Henning received his Ph.D. in German philology at Strasbourg in 1874 under the supervision of Wilhelm Scherer.

Henning habilitated at the University of Berlin in 1877 under the supervision of Karl Müllenhoff and Julius Zupitza with a thesis on the Nibelungenlied. He subsequently lectured on German philology at the University of Berlin from 1877 to 1881. From 1881 to 1895, Henning was Professor of Modern German Literature at the University of Strasbourg, succeeding Erich Schmidt. From 1895 to 1918, Henning was Chair of German Philology and Director of the German Department at the University of Strasbourg. He served as Dean of the Faculty for Philosophy at the University of Strasbourg from 1898 to 1899 and 1907 to 1908.

Henning specialized in Germanic philology. His subject areas included Medieval German literature, modern German literature, early Germanic literature (including Old Norse and Gothic literature, and Germanic religion. He contributed much to the study of the ancient culture of Germanic peoples.

Henning was fired from the University of Strasbourg after the French annexation of Alsace-Lorraine. He subsequently lectured at the University of Heidelberg. He died in Heidelberg on 7 October 1930. Henning was married to Adele, a daughter of Rudolf Virchow.

== Selected works ==
- Das deutsche Haus in seiner historischen Entwicklung (Straßburg/London, K. Trübner, 1882)
- Nibelungenstudien (Straßburg/London, K. Trübner, 1883)
- Die deutschen Haustypen. Nachträgliche Bemerkungen (Straßburg/London, K. Trübner, 1886)
- Die deutschen Runendenkmäler (Straßburg, K. Trübner, 1889)
- Untersuchungen zur deutschen Sprachgeschichte Bde. 1–5 (Hersg.) (1908–1914)
- Der Helm von Baldenheim und die verwandten Helme des frühen Mittelalters (Straßburg, K. Trübner, 1907)
- Denkmäler der Elsässischen Altertums-Sammlung zu Strassburg in Elsas. Von der neolithischen bis zur karolingischen Zeit (Straßburg, K. Trübner, 1912)
- Wettu Irmingot und das Hildebrandslied (ZfdA 58 (1921) S. 141–151)

== Sources ==
- Christoph König (Hrsg.), unter Mitarbeit von Birgit Wägenbaur u. a.: Internationales Germanistenlexikon 1800–1950. Band 2: H–Q. De Gruyter, Berlin/New York 2003, ISBN 3-11-015485-4, S. 720–721 (p. 720, at Google Books).
