= Sunday letter =

Sunday letter or Sunday Letter may refer to:

- Carta dominica or Sunday Letter, an apocryphal letter about Sunday observance
- Dominical letter, a means of calculating the day of the week
