= Karl Müllenhoff =

German philologist

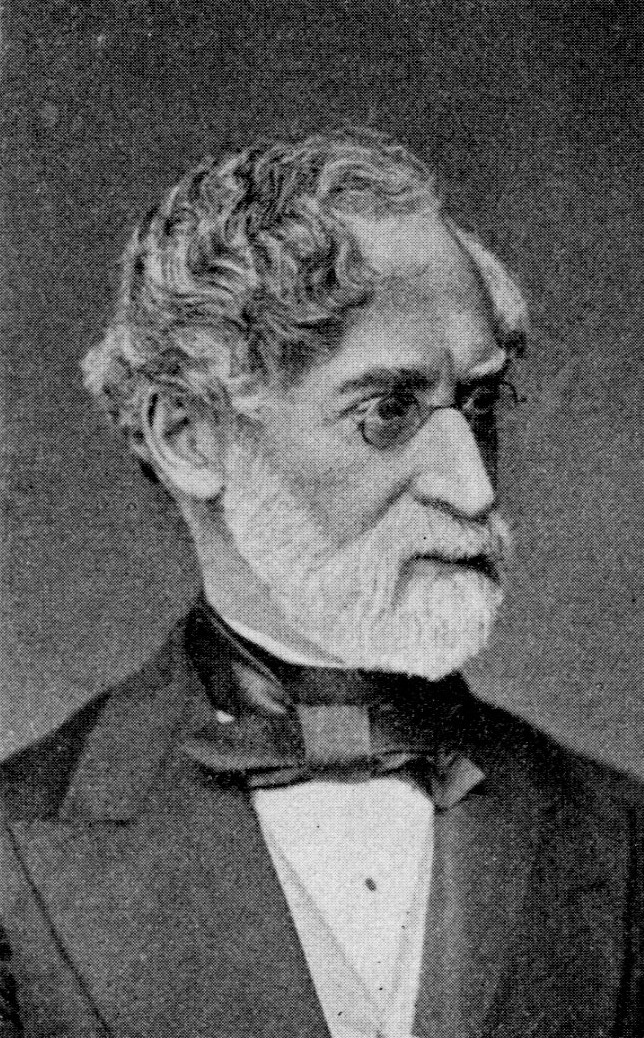
- Born: 8 September 1818; Marne, Duchy of Holstein
- Died: 19 February 1884 (aged 65); Berlin, Germany

Academic background
- Education: University of Kiel
- Academic advisors: Karl Lachmann; Wilhelm Grimm
- Influences: Jacob Grimm

Academic work
- Discipline: Germanic studies
- Sub-discipline: German philology
- Institutions: University of Kiel; University of Berlin
- Notable students: Wilhelm Scherer; Gustaf Kossinna; Oskar Seyffert; Jakob Minor; August Sauer; Rudolf Meissner; Rudolf Henning
- Main interests: Early Germanic literature; German folklore; Germanic Antiquity; Germanic linguistics

Karl Viktor Müllenhoff (born 8 September 1818 in Marne, Duchy of Holstein; died 19 February 1884 in Berlin) was a German philologist who specialized in Germanic studies.

== Biography ==
He was born in Marne, Holstein as the second son of merchant Johann Anton Müllenhoff. In his youth, he received his education in the town of Meldorf (1830–1837). He later studied under Gregor Wilhelm Nitzsch at the University of Kiel, then continued his education at Leipzig (1839, under Gottfried Hermann and Moriz Haupt) and then in Berlin (1839-1841), where his instructors included Karl Lachmann and Wilhelm Grimm. In 1841 he received his PhD at Kiel with a dissertation on Sophocles.

He taught classes in German language, literature and mythology at the University of Kiel, where in 1854 he became a full professor of German literature and history. Afterwards, he returned to Berlin as a professor of German philology (1858-1884). In 1861 he became a member of the Gesetzlose Gesellschaft zu Berlin. Two of his well-known students in Berlin were Wilhelm Scherer and Elias von Steinmeyer.

In 1863 he introduced a theory involving the continuity of written language dating from the era of Old High German.

From around 1875, he resided at Schellingstraße 7 (Berlin-Tiergarten), a few years later, moving to a house on Lützowufer in the same district. He was buried in the Alter St.-Matthäus-Kirchhof in Berlin-Schöneberg. In 1896, a thoroughfare called Müllenhoffstraße (Berlin-Kreuzberg) was named in his honor.

== Publications ==
- Sagen, Märchen und Lieder der herzogthümer Schleswig, Holstein und Lauenburg, 1845 – Collection of sagas, fairy tales and songs from the Duchies of Schleswig, Holstein and Lauenburg.
- De Antiquissima Germanorum Poesi Chorica, a treatise; cited as one of his greatest works (1847).
- Altdeutsche Sprachproben, 1864 (4th edition, 1885. 5th edition, 1963).
- Denkmäler deutscher Poesie und Prosa aus dem 8. bis 12. Jahrhundert, with Wilhelm Scherer (Berlin, 1864) – Monuments of German poetry and prose from the 8th-12th century.
- Deutsche Alterthumskunde, left unfinished; cited as one of his greatest works (1870–99); five volumes.
  - Vol. 1. Die Phoenizier. Pytheas von Massalia.
  - Vol. 2. Die Nord- und Ostnachbaren der Germanen. Die Gallier und Germanen.
  - Vol. 3. Der Ursprung der Germanen.
  - Vol. 4. Die Germania des Tacitus.
  - Vol. 5. Über die Voluspa. Über die ältere Edda.
