= Institute of Modern Languages Research =

English research institution

- Former names: Institute of Germanic and Romance Studies
- Type: Graduate school
- Established: 2004
- Parent institution: School of Advanced Study, University of London
- Director: Charles Burdett
- Location: London, England, United Kingdom
- Campus: Urban
- Nickname: IMLR
- Website: modernlanguages.sas.ac.uk

The Institute of Modern Languages Research is a research institution associated with the University of London. A constituent institute of the School of Advanced Study based on the second floor of the Senate House, the Institute of Modern Languages Research promotes and facilitates national and international collaborative, cross-disciplinary and cross-cultural research by means of seminars, lectures, workshops, colloquia, conferences, a fellowships programme, and its various research centres. In October 2022, it changed its name to Institute of Languages, Cultures and Societies.

== History ==
The Institute of Germanic Studies was founded in 1950 to promote and facilitate the study of German-speaking cultures. It was joined in 1989 by the Institute of Romance Studies, which was founded to promote and facilitate the study of Romance language-speaking cultures. The two institutes were merged in 2004 to form the new Institute of Germanic & Romance Studies. It became the Institute of Modern Languages Research in 2013, when its Euro-centric focus began broadening significantly to encompass the study of all languages currently spoken around the world. The institute has since also come to engage directly in emerging interlingual and inter-disciplinary topics such as translingualism and translation.

From April 2021 it has further broadened its scope as it has included Latin American Studies through the establishment of the Centre for Latin American and Caribbean Studies (CLACS), formerly the Institute of Latin American Studies (ILAS).

=== Degrees ===
As well as offering doctoral supervision, and co-supervision as a member of the London Arts & Humanities Partnership (LAHP), the institute currently offers a Masters by Research postgraduate degree MRes in Modern Languages.

Research degrees are offered in the modern languages, broadly conceived. The institute has significant expertise, archival strengths and student funding in its historical focus:

- Germanic Studies (German language, literature and cultural studies)
- Romance Studies (French, Italian, Spanish and Portuguese language, literature and cultural studies)
- Comparative and interdisciplinary studies (the city-especially Berlin or Trieste, the virtual or imagined city, borders, the body, psychoanalysis, German philosophy and history of ideas, women's writing, Jewish writing, exile writing, children's literature and feminism).
- Latin American studies

However, along with the new, broader remit of the institute, the range and fluidity of its expertise have also increased significantly in recent years.

=== Affiliated research centres ===
Several research centres are affiliated with the institute, including

- Centre for the Study of Cultural Memory
- Centre for the Study of Contemporary Women's Writing
- Ingeborg Bachmann Centre for Austrian Literature
- Research Centre for German and Austrian Exile Studies
- Centre for Quebec and French-Canadian Studies
- Ernst Bloch Centre for German Thought
- Centre for Latin American and Caribbean Studies (CLACS)

=== Events and activities ===
The institute organises and hosts a large number of events around the year, promoting and facilitating research into a very broad range of modern languages and Latin American studies topics. The vast majority of these events are free of charge and open to everyone, from scholars and students of London colleges and universities, to interested members of the public. These events draw leading scholars in Modern Languages and Latin American Studies from around the United Kingdom and world to London to share their findings.

=== Fellowships ===
The institute is also host to a large number of stipendiary and non-stipendiary fellowships, which allow leaders in modern languages and Latin American studies research fields at various stages of their careers to spend time at the institute, undertaking advanced research production, promotion, and facilitation activities.

=== Archives ===
- Archive of the Anglo-Austrian Society [AAS]
- Berthold Auerbach Collection and Archive of Germanic Drama
- Mary Beare Papers [MBE]
- Jethro Bithell Papers [JBI]
- Karl H. Breul Papers [KHB]
- E. M. Butler Papers
- August Closs Papers
- Elizabeth Closs-Traugott Papers
- Hannah Closs Papers
- Archive of the English Goethe Society
- Exile Archive
- Leonard W. Forster Papers
- H. F. Garten Papers
- History and Development of German Studies [HGS]
- Friedrich Gundolf Archive (Printed Catalogues only) [FGU]
- Sylvia Harris Papers
- Ida Herz Papers
- Archives of the Institute of Germanic Studies [IGS]
- James Blair Leishman Correspondence and Diaries
- Herbert Löwit Papers
- Rudolf Majut Papers
- Martin Miller and Hannah Norbert-Miller Archive
- Margaret Mynatt / Yvonne Kapp Papers
- Robert Priebsch Papers
- William Rose Papers
- J. P. Stern Papers
- Herbert Thoma Papers
- Gilbert Waterhouse Papers
- Marianne Wynn Papers

Collections that have so far only undergone initial sorting and listing include:

- The papers of Dr P. V. Brady
- Norman McCann Collection (German and Austrian theatre programmes)
- Papers of Professor L. A. Willoughby and Professor E. M. Wilkinson

=== Resources in Latin American Studies ===
Through its Centre for Latin American and Caribbean Studies (CLACS), the IMLR hosts and curates a range of digital, open access resources that seek to facilitate research in the field of Latin American studies. These include:

- Research Portal
- Library and E-Resources
- The Caribbean Studies Collection
- The Legal Cultures of the Subsoil Database
