= Euphorion (journal) =

Euphorion is a German-language academic journal for history of literature. It was established in 1894 by August Sauer. From 1934 until 1944 it appeared under the title Dichtung und Volkstum.
