= Rudolf Meissner =

German philologist

- Born: 3 February 1862; Glogau, Kingdom of Prussia
- Died: 27 October 1948 (aged 86); Bonn, Germany

Academic background
- Education: University of Göttingen
- Doctoral advisor: Moritz Heyne
- Other advisor: Gustav Roethe

Academic work
- Discipline: Germanic philology
- Sub-discipline: German philology; Old Norse philology
- Institutions: University of Königsberg; University of Bonn
- Main interests: Medieval German literature; Old Norse literature

Georg Paul Rudolf Meissner or Meißner or Meiszner (14 September 1863 – 14 July 1941) was a German philologist who specialized in Germanic studies.

== Biography ==
Rudolf Meissner was born in Glogau, Kingdom of Prussia, the son of distiller C. Augustin Meissner and Minna Meissner. Meissner married Eleonore (1880-1948), who was a daughter of Robert Vischer and granddaughter of Friedrich Theodor Vischer. By marriage, Meissner was a relative of the fellow philologist Dietrich Kralik.

After gaining his abitur in Glogau, Meissner studied classical and German philology at the University of Göttingen under Friedrich Bechtel, Wilhelm Dilthey, Karl Goedeke, Moritz Heyne and others. From 1881 to 1882 he studied at the University of Berlin under Karl Müllenhoff and Wilhelm Scherer. He gained his Ph.D. at Göttingen in 1886 under the supervision of Heyne with a thesis on Medieval German literature. He completed his habilitation at Göttingen in 1896 under the supervision of Gustav Roethe with a thesis on the Strengleikar.

From 1896 to 1906, Meissner lectured at Göttingen. During this time he assisted Heyne with the editing of the Deutsches Wörterbuch. In 1906, Meissner transferred to the University of Königsberg, where he served as Professor of German and Nordic Philology (1906-1913) and Dean of the Philosophical Faculty (1913). In 1913 Meissner transferred to the University of Bonn, where he served as Chair of Germanic Philology (1913-1931) and Rector (1928-1929).

Although retiring from his duties at Bonn in 1931, Meissner continued to lecture there. He returned to the University in the aftermath of World War II, serving as a full professor since 1946. He died in Bonn on 27 October 1948.

Meissner specialized in the study of early Germanic literature, particularly Medieval German and Old Norse literature, and Medieval Scandinavian law. He was the author of numerous works on these subjects. Meissner was a member of many learned societies, including the Royal Nordic Society of Antiquaries, the Norwegian Academy of Science and Letters, the Göttingen Academy of Sciences and Humanities and the Bavarian Academy of Sciences and Humanities. He was Knight 4th Class of the Order of the Red Eagle and a recipient of the Goethe-Medaille für Kunst und Wissenschaft.

== Selected works ==
- Bertold Steinmar von Klingnau und seine Lieder (= Göttinger Beiträge zur deutschen Philologie, Band 1), Schöning, Paderborn / Münster 1866 OCLC 248542737 (Dissertation Universität Göttingen 1886, 31 Seiten).
- Deutsches Wörterbuch, Band 9: Schiefeln - Seele, als Bearbeiter mit Moritz Heyne. (Leipzig, 1899)
- Die Strengleikar, ein Beitrag zur Geschichte der altnordischen Prosaliteratur, M. Niemeyer, Halle (Saale) 1902.
- Skaldenpoesie. Ein Vortrag (Halle/S., M. Niemeyer, 1904)
- Die Geschichte von den Leuten aus dem Lachswassertal (Übersetzung) (Jena, E. Diedrichs, Sammlung Thule Bd. 6, 1913)
- Die Kenningar der Skalden. Ein Beitrag zur skaldischen Poetik (Bonn/Leipzig, K. Schroeder, 1921)
- Eysteinn Ásgrimsson: Die Lilie. Dichtung (Übersetzung) (Bonn/Leipzig, K. Schroeder, 1922)
- Die Nordgermanen und das Christentum. Rede beim Antritt des Rektorats 1927–28 (Bonn, Bonner akademische Reden 1., 1929)
- Skaldisches Lesebuch (Hersg. mit E. A. Kock) (Halle/S., M. Niemeyer, 1931)
- Übersetzungen Altnorwegischer Rechtstexte in der Reihe: „Germanenrechte“ (Weimar, Böhlau, 1935–1950)
  - Norwegisches Recht. Das Rechtsbuch des Gulathings(Weimar, Germanenrechte Bd. 6, 1935)
  - Norwegisches Recht. Das Gefolgschaftsrecht (Weimar, Germanenrechte Bd. 5, 1938)
  - Norwegisches Recht. Das Gesetzbuch des Frostothings (Weimar, Germanenrechte Bd. 4, 1939)
  - Landrecht des Königs Magnus Hakonarson (Weimar, Germanenrechte Neue Folge (N.F.), Nordgermanisches Recht 1., 1941)
  - Bruchstücke der Rechtsbücher des Borgarthings und des Eidsivathings (Weimar, Germanenrechte N.F. Nordgermanisches Recht 2., 1942)
  - Stadtrecht des Königs Magnus Hakonarson für Bergen. Bruchstücke des Birkinselrechts und Seefahrerrecht der Jonsbok (Weimar, Germanenrechte N.F. Nordgermanisches Recht 3., Post mortem 1950)
- Der Königspiegel. Konungsskuggsjä (Übersetzung) (Halle/S., M. Niemeyer, 1944)

== Sources ==
- Christoph König (Hrsg.), unter Mitarbeit von Birgit Wägenbaur u. a.: Internationales Germanistenlexikon 1800–1950. Band 2: H–Q. De Gruyter, Berlin/New York 2003, ISBN 3-11-015485-4, S. 1195–1196 (p. 1195, at Google Books).
