= Hannah Margaret Mary Closs =

British critic and novelist

Hannah Margaret Mary Closs (1905-1953) was an art critic and novelist. She wrote three novels and a book on aesthetics.

== Biography ==
Hannah Margaret Mary Closs (née Priebsch) was born in Hampstead, London, the daughter of German scholar Robert Priebsch (1866–1935). She wrote a book on aesthetics, Her Art and Life (1936), and a re-working of the Tristan story (1940). Her three novels, republished as the Tarn Trilogy, treat Catharism.

She married August Closs, an Austrian-born professor of German Studies, in 1931. They had one daughter, Elizabeth Closs Traugott, who was a professor of linguistics and English at Stanford University, from 1970 to 2003. She fell ill with toxaemia and died in Bristol General Hospital.

== Bibliography ==
=== Novels ===
- High are the Mountains (1945)
- And Sombre are the Valleys (1949, republished as Deep are the Valleys, 1960)
- The Silent Tarn (1955)
