= Friedrich Heinrich von der Hagen =

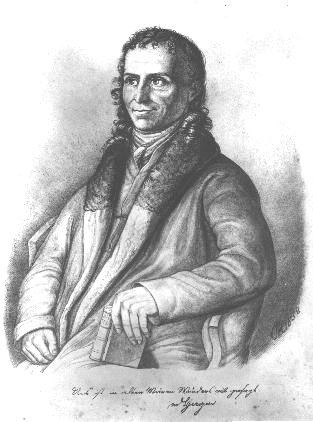
Friedrich Heinrich von der Hagen

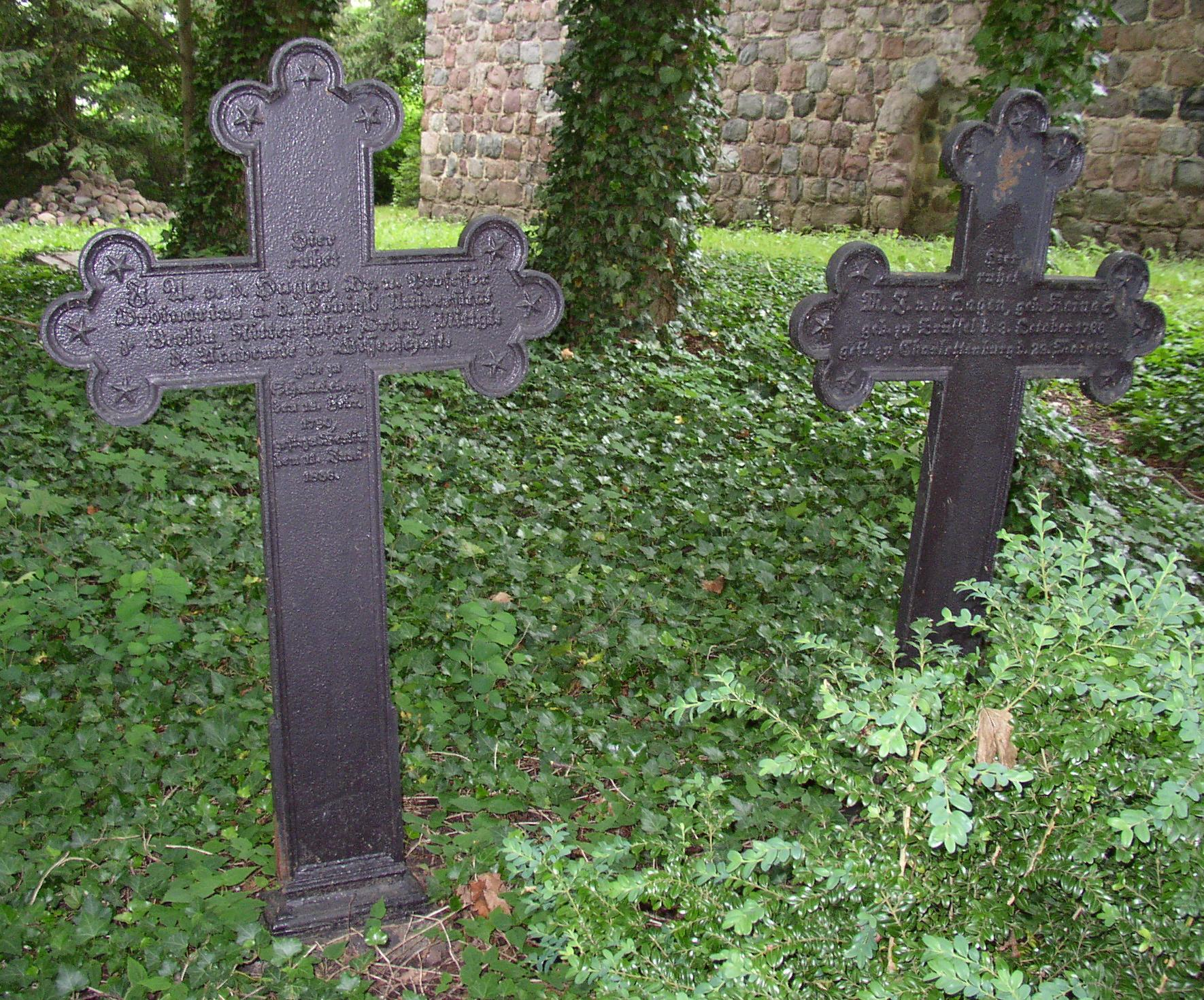
Grave in Angermünde-Schmiedeberg

Friedrich Heinrich von der Hagen (19 February 1780 – 11 June 1856) was a German philologist, chiefly distinguished for his researches in Old German literature.

He was born at Angermünde-Schmiedeberg in the Uckermark region of the Margraviate of Brandenburg. After studying law at the University of Halle, he obtained a legal appointment in the state service at Berlin, but in 1806 resigned in order to devote himself exclusively to letters. In 1810 he was appointed professor extraordinarius of German literature at the University of Berlin. In the following year he was transferred in a similar capacity to the University of Breslau, and in 1821 returned to Berlin as professor ordinarius. Although von der Hagen's critical work is now entirely out of date, he is credited with awakening an interest in old German poetry.

Principal publications:

- the Nibelungenlied, of which he issued four editions, the first in 1810 and the last in 1842
- the Minnesinger (Leipzig, 1838–1856, 4 vols. in 5 parts)
- Lieder der altern Edda (Berlin, 1812)
- Gottfried von Strassburg (Berlin, 1823)
- a collection of Old German tales under the title Gesammtabenteuer (Stuttgart, 1850, 3 vol.)
- Das Heldenbuch (Leipzig, 1855).
- Die Thidrekssaga.
- Hundert Deutsche Erzählungen (includes Der Busant, 1850; republished 1961)

He also published Über die ältesten Darstellungen der Faustsage (Berlin, 1844); and from 1835 he edited Das neue Jahrbuch der Berlinischen Gesellschaft der deutsche Sprache und Altertumskunde. His correspondence with Christian Gottlob Heyne and Georg Friedrich Benecke was published by K. Dziatzko (Leipzig, 1893).
