= August Closs =

Professor of German studies

August Max Closs (9 August 1898 – 21 June 1990) was a professor of German studies. Born in Austria, he studied German and English language and literature, and in 1929 moved to London. There he taught at University College, and became friends with the German scholar Robert Priebsch, whose daughter Hannah he married. In 1931 he began teaching at the University of Bristol, where he stayed until his retirement in 1964. He was a prolific author on and editor and anthologizer of German poetry. In addition, he was a dedicated collector of manuscripts and books; part of his collection was sold to Princeton University, and the rest forms the Priebsch-Closs Collection Institute of Germanic and Romance Studies. He is remembered also for his efforts to bring about German-English reconciliation after the Second World War, especially between the cities of Bristol and Hannover.

== Biography ==
Closs was born in Neumarkt in Steiermark, Austria, the child of a law official, Alois Closs, and his wife, Rosa (born Halm). From 1906 to 1916 he attended the Fürstbischöfliches Gymnasium in Graz, then served in the Austrian army. The Italians imprisoned him in 1918, and upon his release, in 1919, he enrolled at the University of Graz where he studied German and English and received his doctorate with a thesis on Arno Holz, directed by Bernhard Seuffert. At the University of Vienna he got a teaching qualification in 1924, then taught school.

He moved to England in 1929 and lectured at the University of Sheffield before he moved to London and taught at University College London. There he met Robert Priebsch, a German professor (author of Handschriften in England, Erlangen 1896-1901), whose daughter Hannah he married in 1931. They had one daughter, Elizabeth Closs Traugott, who was a professor of linguistics and English at Stanford University, from 1970 to 2003. Closs admired Priebsch greatly, and edited of some of his unpublished work, including Letter from Heaven (1936) and Christi Leiden in einer Vision geschaut (1936), as well as his correspondence with the linguist Elias von Steinmeyer.

That same year, 1931, Closs moved his family to Bristol, where he began a long career at the University of Bristol. He was hired as a lecturer and head of the German department, was promoted to reader in 1936, and professor in 1948; he retired in 1964. By that time he had been visiting professor all over Europe and the US and Canada, and had advised Jawaharlal Nehru on reforming universities in India.

Closs published monographs, edited anthologies of German literature, and wrote many articles and reviews. He was both praised and criticized for an idiosyncrasy considered unorthodox, belonging to a different age; a reviewer of the second edition of his The Genius of the German Lyric (the fact that a book of literary criticism appeared in a second edition is remarked as notable) criticizes the book for historical confusion and easy generalities, but remarks, "Of course it would be wrong to ignore the very positive aspects of this book. It stands in a tradition of writing which has by now largely died out, being a highly subjective, idiosyncratic study, the product of a civilized outlook, wide reading and a real love of the subject. As such it inevitably demands to be judged by standards other than those of orthodox present-day academic scholarship". The Dictionary of National Biography describes him thusly:

A gracious, charming man in an old-fashioned Austrian manner, he seemed in later life almost the archetypal professor of popular imagination, with straggly white hair, wayward handwriting, and an infectious enthusiasm for anything that caught his attention. Like Goethe he believed that literature could have an effect on individuals and mould them into world citizens. As a teacher he had a rare ability to bring poetry alive, and published on it prolifically.

After World War II, Closs played an important part in the reestablishment of cultural relations between Germany and England, especially between the war-damaged cities of Bristol and Hannover. He led an "expedition" of five men representing educational, governmental, and commercial organizations from Bristol on a visit to Hannover to investigate possible aid projects. In the end, a committee was formed to "support and develop contacts" with Hannover in various areas, efforts for which Closs was rewarded in 1987 with honorary citizenship of the city of Hannover. He died of heart failure in hospital in Bristol on 21 June 1990. His memorial service, on 2 November 1990 at St Mary Redcliffe, was described as "magnificent...framed with the music of Mozart", with the burgomaster of Hannover as one of the participants.

== Books ==
From his father-in-law Closs and his wife inherited an extensive collection of manuscripts that he augmented significantly. He sold 273 16th-century books to Princeton University in 1969. The 2300 volumes of his 17th to 19th-century books comprise the Priebsch-Closs collection of the Institute of Germanic and Romance Studies in London, and after his death the rest of his collection, including 20th-century first editions, manuscripts, and correspondences were donated to the Institute.

== Awards ==
- Order of Merit of the Federal Republic of Germany, grand cross
- Austrian Decoration for Science and Art
- Honorary doctorate, Leibniz University Hannover
- Honorary doctorate, University of Bristol

== Bibliography ==
- The Genius of the German Lyric: An Historical Survey of Its Formal and Metaphysical Values (1938, rev. 1962)
- Tristan and Isolt (Oxford: Basil Blackwell, 1944)
- Die freien Rhythmen in der deutschen Lyrik (1947), dedicated to Priebsch
- Die neuere deutsche Lyrik vom Barock bis zur Gegenwart (Berlin: Erich Schmidt, 1952)
- Medusa's Mirror: Studies in German Literature (London: Cresset, 1957), a collection of essays dedicated to his wife
- Reality and Creative Vision in German Lyric Poetry (London: Butterworth, 1963), edited collection
- German Literature series, editor:
  - German Literature in the Sixteenth and Seventeenth Centuries
  - Twentieth-century German Literature (London: Cresset, 1969; New York: Barnes and Noble, 1969)
- Robert Priebsch-Elias von Steinmeyer: Briefwechsel. Ausgewahlt und herausgegeben von August Closs (Berlin: Erich Schmidt, 1979)
