= Robert Priebsch =

German professor and philologist

Robert Priebsch

Robert Priebsch (11 June 1866 – 25 May 1935) was a Bohemian-German philologist, paleographer, and expert on medieval literature in both Anglo-Saxon and other Germanic languages. He moved to the United Kingdom in 1895 or 1896, and embarked on a successful academic career, teaching first at the University of Liverpool and then acquiring a full professorship at University College, London, where he worked from 1898–1931 and served as chair of the German department from 1902–1931.

== Biography ==
Robert Priebsch was born in Tannwald on 11 June 1866 in the Kingdom of Bohemia, then part of the Austrian Empire (modern Tanvald in the Czech Republic). He was the second of four sons, and his family were Sudeten Germans. He was afflicted by foot problems from an early age, an ailment that never left him, with the sole comfort that his difficulty in moving about lead to a lifetime love of reading books. He studied at the Realgymnasium of Reichenberg (Liberec) from 1879–1886, with the exception of 1882 where he studied at a German gymnasium in Neustadt-Prag. He proceeded to various German-speaking universities in the years afterward, studying German literature, Germanic mythology, philosophy, and the Anglo-Saxon language. He completed his doctoral thesis under Anton Schönbach at the University of Graz.

Priebsch married in 1898. The couple had a daughter, Hannah, together.

Priebsch moved to the United Kingdom in 1895 or 1896 to inspect and catalogue medieval manuscripts in both public and private collections. His work impressed others as to his skill in German paleography, and he soon acquired a lecturer position at the University of Liverpool with the support of Kuno Meyer. Friedrich Althaus, a professor of German at University College London, died in 1897. Priebsch was hired to replace him; his tenure as professor would last from 1898 to 1931. He became chair of the German department in 1902, a position he held until retirement. With one of his students, W. E. Collinson, he published The German Language (1934). His two-volume Deutsche Handschriften in England (Erlangen 1896–1901) is a standard in the field.

His extensive collection of books and manuscripts was left to his daughter Hannah and his son-in-law August Closs; augmented significantly by Closs, the collection included 2300 volumes of 17th to 19th-century books which now comprise the Priebsch-Closs collection of the Institute of Germanic and Romance Studies in London.

His correspondence with Elias von Steinmeyer was edited and published by Closs.

Priebsch died on 25 May 1935 in a Waldsanatorium near Vienna. In his study, an incomplete work on the Letter from Heaven (Himmelsbrief) was found; it was published posthumously in 1936, including a full Bibliography of Priebsch's work.

== Select bibliography ==
- Robert Priebsch-Elias von Steinmeyer: Briefwechsel. Ausgewahlt und herausgegeben von August Closs (Berlin: Erich Schmidt, 1979)
- The German language / by R. Priebsch and W. E. Collinson. – 1. publ. – London : Faber & Faber, 1934
- Christi Leiden, in einer Vision geschaut. Heidelberg : Winter, 1936. Digital Version
- Die heilige Regel für ein vollkommenes Leben : eine Cisterzienserarbeit des XIII. Jahrhunderts; aus der Handschrift Additional 9048 des British Museum. Berlin : Weidmann, 1909. Digital Version
- Bruder Rausch : Facsimile-Ausgabe des aeltesten niederdeutschen Druckes (A) nebst den Holzschnitten des niederlaendischen Druckes (J) vom Jahre 1596. Zwickau : Ullmann, 1919. Digital Version
- Deutsche Handschriften in England. 2 Volumes, Erlangen 1896–1901; Neudruck Olms, Hildesheim/New York 1979.
- Deutsche Prosafragmente des XII. Jahrhunderts. I: Bruchstücke des sog. Bamberger Arzneibuchs vermischt mit anderen medicinischen Traktaten. In: Modern Language Review 10, 1915, pp. 203–221; II: Bruchstücke der sogenannten Practica des Meister Bartholomaeus. In: Modern Language Review 11, 1916, pp. 321–334.
- Johan uz dem virgiere : eine spätmittelhochdeutsche Ritterdichtung nach flämischer Quelle. Heidelberg : Winter, 1931. Digital Version
