= Bernhard Ludwig Suphan =

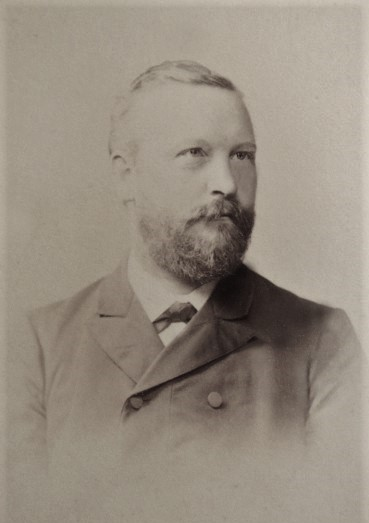
Bernhard Ludwig Suphan

Bernhard Ludwig Suphan (18 January 1845, in Nordhausen – 9 February 1911, in Weimar) was a German philologist, known for his historical-critical edition of the complete works of Johann Gottfried Herder (33 volumes).

He studied classical and German philology at the universities of Halle and Berlin, and from 1868 worked as a gymnasium teacher in Berlin. In 1887 he was appointed director of the Goethe Archives in Weimar (from 1889 onward, known as the Goethe-Schiller Archives).

== Selected works ==
- Herders sämmtliche Werke, (33 volumes, 1877–1913; with Otto Hoffmann, Reinhold Steig and others) – Herder's collected works.
- Friedrichs des Grossen Schrift über die Deutsche Litterature, (1888) – Frederick the Great's writings on German literature.
- Friedrich Rückert; Vortrag gehalten in Weimar am 16.Mai 1888, (1888) – On Friedrich Rückert; a lecture held in Weimar on 16 May 1888.
- Xenien 1796. Nach den Handschriften des Goethe- und Schiller- Archivs, (with Erich Schmidt, 1893) – Xenien 1796: according to manuscripts of the Goethe-Schiller archives.
- Fritz Reuter und Klaus Groth im Goethe- und Schiller-Archiv, (1906) – On Fritz Reuter and Klaus Groth in the Goethe-Schiller archives.
