= James Blair Leishman =

British scholar

James Blair Leishman, FBA (8 May 1902 – 14 August 1963) was a British scholar of English literature and a translator of German poetry.

The son of a merchant, Leishman was schooled at Earnseal School and at Rydal Mount in Colwyn Bay before studying classics at St John's College, Oxford; he completed a BLitt in English in 1929. In 1928, he was appointed to an assistant lectureship at the University College, Southampton. He remained there until 1946, when he moved to the University of Oxford to be a full lecturer; he was promoted to a senior lectureship two years later. He was also a lecturer (1948–60) and senior research fellow (from 1960) at St John's College, Oxford.

He published on seventeenth-century English poetry, and also translated Germany poetry, mostly by Rilke and Hölderlin. He died after falling during a walk in Switzerland in 1963, the same year that he had been elected a fellow of the British Academy.
