= Elias von Steinmeyer =

German philologist (1848-1922)

Elias von Steinmeyer (8 February 1848, in Nowawes, near Potsdam – 8 March 1922, in Erlangen) was a German philologist.

He studied philology at the University of Berlin, and from 1870 worked as an assistant in the private state archives in Berlin. In 1873 he was named an associate professor at the University of Strasbourg, and in 1877 became a full professor of German philology at the University of Erlangen. From 1874 to 1890 he was the editor of the Zeitschrift für deutsches Altertum. He is best known for Die kleineren althochdeutschen Sprachdenkmaler (1916) and the Althochdeutsche Glossen (five volumes, 1879-1922, with Eduard Sievers).

His correspondence with Robert Priebsch was edited and published by Priebsch's son-in-law August Closs. He was the author of numerous biographies in the Allgemeine Deutsche Biographie.

== Selected published works ==
- Die Althochdeutschen Glossen, with Eduard Sievers.
  - Volume 1: Glossen zu biblischen Schriften (1879).
  - Volume 2: Glossen zu nichtbiblischen Schriften (1882).
  - Volume 3: Sachlich geordnete Glossare (1895).
  - Volume 4: Alphabetisch geordnete Glossare. Adespota. Addenda to vols 1–3. Handschriftenverzeichnis (index of manuscripts) (1898).
  - Volume 5: Ergänzungen und Untersuchungen (1922).
- Denkmäler deutscher Poesie und Prosa aus dem VIII–XII. Jahrhundert 2 vols., ed. Karl Müllenhoff and Wilhelm Scherer; 3rd ed. Berlin: Weidmann, 1892.
- Die kleineren althochdeutschen Sprachdenkmäler Berlin: Weidmann, 1916.
