= Johann Friedrich von Cronegk =

German poet

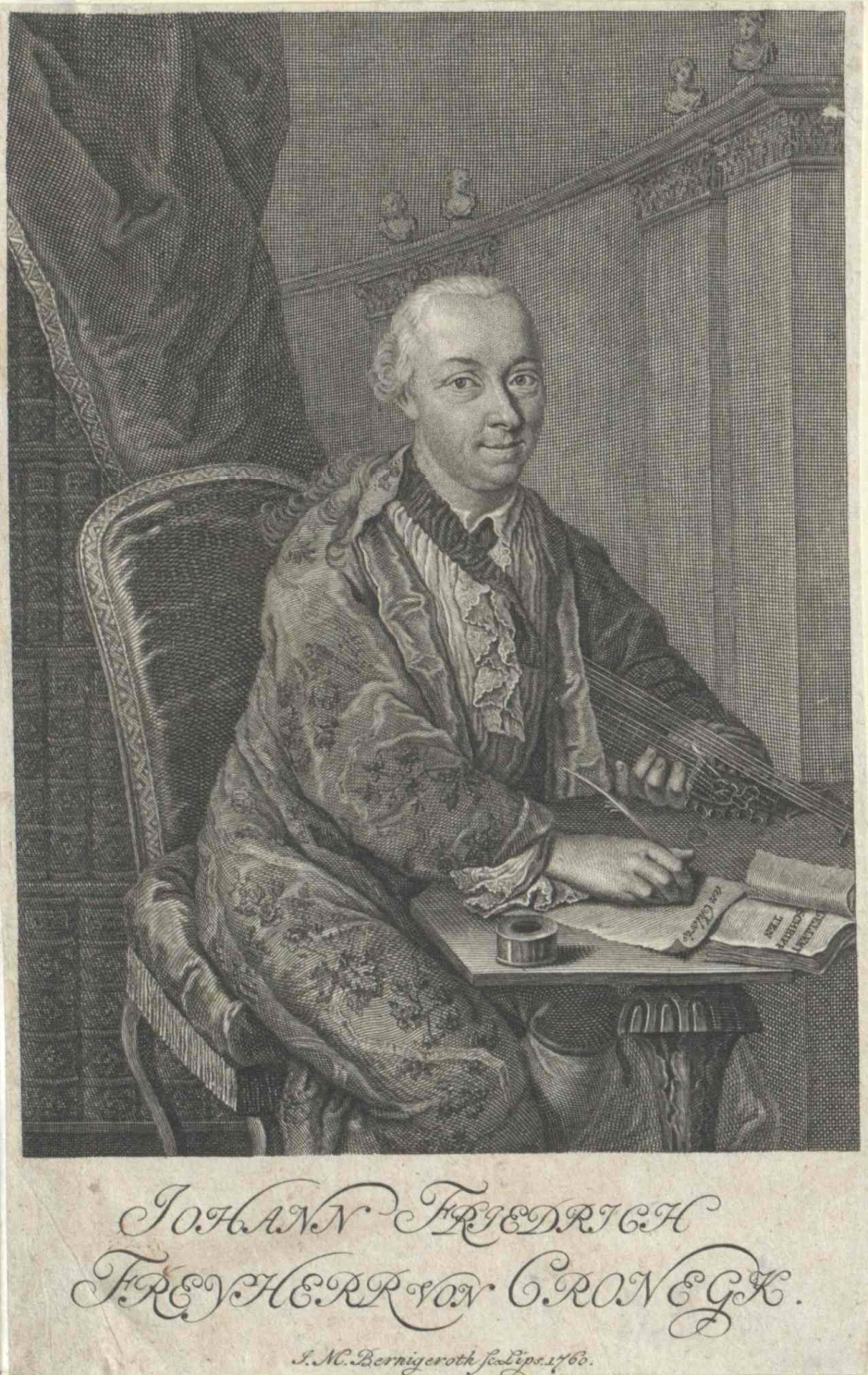
Johann Friedrich von Cronegk.

Johann Friedrich von Cronegk (2 September 1731 – 1 January 1758) was a German poet. He was born in Ansbach Principality of Ansbach.

== Biography ==
Cronegk studied law in Halle and Leipzig and visited Italy and France before returning to his hometown to be a court councilor.

He acquired some rank among the noble authors of Germany, and wrote plays which had a temporary success, among them "Codrus" and "Olint and Sophronia."

== Bibliography ==
- Des Freyherrn Johann Friedrich von Cronegk Schriften. Ansbach: Verlag Alte Post 2003. ISBN 3-936938-01-6.
