= Sunday Letter =

Christian apocrypha

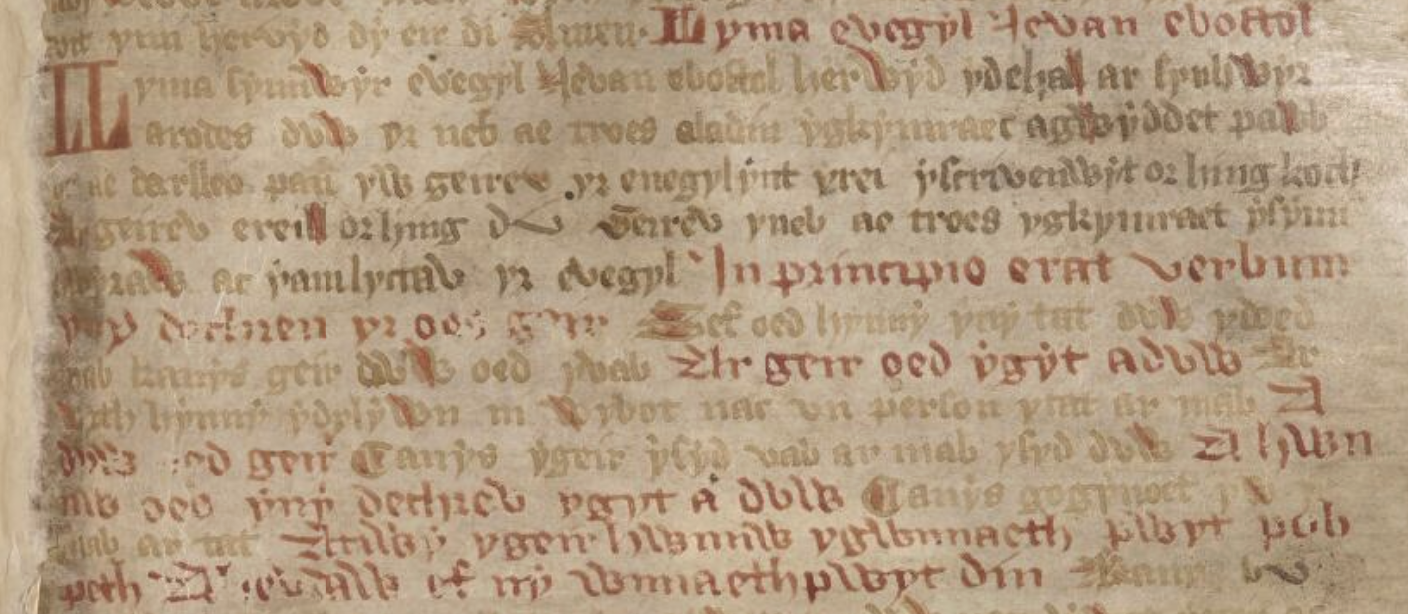
A Welsh manuscript of the Sunday Letter, 14th or 15th century

The Sunday Letter, also known as the Carta Dominica, Epistle of Christ from Heaven, and other titles, (Note: Other names include the Letter from Heaven, Letter on the Observance of the Lord's Day, Heavenly Letter, and variants such as Scrolls / Leaflets from Heaven. In French, the Lettre du Christ tombée du ciel; in Irish, the Epistil Ísu.) is an apocryphal text of the New Testament purportedly written by the heavenly Jesus directly and sent to Earth. The text emphasises the importance of Sunday as the day of Sabbath for Christians. It was probably written before 600 CE, but a more specific date is not known. Both the identity of the original author and the original language of the letter are unknown as well.

The work was widely copied as a kind of chain letter, perhaps the first letter to qualify as one, due to claims within that failing to spread the letter to everyone would bring disaster and punishment, but having a copy of the letter on hand would bring good fortune. Due to its wide copying, many versions exist, and details change between individual manuscripts.

== Background ==
Sabbatarianism, the observance of the Sabbath and specifically Sunday as the day of the Sabbath, does not appear to have been common in early Christianity of the first two centuries. Rather, Jewish Christians observed Saturday, and converted pagans interpreted the commandments about the Lord's Day metaphorically or theologically, and not as necessarily constraining personal activity on any day. Emperor Constantine established Sunday as a day of rest in 321 CE, but did not attach a particular theological rationale to it. The first known advocate of transferring the Sabbath from Saturday to Sunday was Eusebius of Caesarea, writing at some point after 330 CE. Even still, Sunday was often treated more as a festival day off such that it was easy to attend services, especially in Eastern Christianity. It seems that Sabbatarianism that insisted on the special holiness of Sunday gained strength in the 5th, 6th, and 7th centuries, being more of an early medieval development.

The Sunday Letter is a text of New Testament apocrypha, stories of New Testament figures that circulated among Christians that were not canonized as scripture. Other somewhat similar works existed in the era of the late Roman Empire, such as "Sunday Lists" that sought to demonstrate the special importance of Sunday via listing momentous and amazing events said to have happened on a Sunday, although it is unclear how much they inspired or affected the original authors and copyists.

== Contents ==
The wide circulation of the Sunday Letter has led to many variants in the text. (Note: Including an account of monstrous locusts and the text's travel to Ireland in the Irish version of the text.) Sometimes the letter opens with an introduction which usually recounts a discovery narrative of the letter falling from the sky to some appropriately holy location such as Jerusalem, Bethlehem, or Rome. It largely recounts the role of Jesus in forming Adam, him giving spiritual commandments to Moses, the text being found or delivered after Jesus's resurrection, and the importance of Sunday as the Sabbath. The Sunday teachings are especially prominent in the text, and Jesus warns readers of mortal and spiritual dangers for not respecting the Sabbath. Those who neglect it may face punishments such as being burned alive and facing a harsh judgment by God, while the text promises blessings to those who devoutly observe the Sabbath on Sunday.

Some versions of the Sunday Letter specify that the Sabbath begins at 3:00 PM on Saturday and continues until dawn on Monday.

== Authorship, date, and spread ==
Woe to the priest who does not receive and
read this epistle in front of the people!

— Sunday Letter, Paris Gr. 929 version, 2:34

The Sunday Letter has been widely copied and translated into many languages and scripts, including Medieval Greek, Syriac, Armenian, the Garšūnī script for Arabic, Coptic, Ethiopic, Latin, Russian, modern Greek, French, German, English, Italian, Spanish, and more. The original language of the text is unknown, but it may have been written in Greek. It was written before 600 CE, as bishop Licianus of Cartagena in Spain wrote a letter condemning the text around 584. A more precise date is not known. All variants of the text descend from one original, which has not been preserved.

It has circulated widely due to its chain letter-like qualities; the letter requests its readers to circulate the text and always possess a copy. If they do not, the letter claims, they will face various hardships in their lives. Use of the text was challenged as heretical by a Lateran Council in the mid-700s, Saint Boniface condemned the letter as "the bungling work of a madman or the devil himself" in the 700s as well, and it was condemned in Charlemagne's Admonitio generalis in 789. The work seems to have spread to Ireland and Iceland by the 8th century (and possibly as early as the 6th century), and spread from Ireland to England by the 830s CE.

Various forms of the letter circulated in modern times. Voltaire reproduced a booklet, printed in Bourges in 1771, giving a version which purportedly descended from the sky at Paimpol. The distribution of variants of the Letter persisted in France until around 1852, when book peddling disappeared. Hippolyte Delehaye, president of the Bollandist Society, saw in the words attributed to Our Lady of La Salette an avatar of the Letter of Jesus Christ on Sunday. Robert Priebsch compiled an attempt at organizing versions of the letter into different major recensions, which was published posthumously in 1936.

== Theology ==
While versions of the letter vary, in general, the letter is closer to a Christianized version of Mosaic law that insists on keeping God's commandments than it is to a Pauline or proto-Lutheran understanding of justification by faith. Obedience to God's law is rewarded, and neglecting it is punished. The offered rewards are generally spiritual ones; versions of the letter do not generally suggest material wealth or power as God's reward, but rather a favorable judgment in the afterlife. It is not just keeping the Sabbath; care of orphans, widows, beggars, laborers, the poor, and so on, are also commanded, in keeping with the gospels which are "my Law" as well.

The text is one of very few that claim direct authorship from Jesus, albeit post-resurrection. (Note: Others that also claim direct authorship by Jesus include the Doctrine of Addai (containing the Abgar correspondence), the Narrative of Joseph of Arimathea, and parts of the Epistle of the Apostles.)

== Bibliography ==
- Borsje, Jacqueline (1994). "The bruch in the Irish version of the Sunday Letter". Ériu. 45: 83–98. JSTOR 30007713.
- Laansma, Jon C. (2022). "Sunday Letter". In Edwards, J. Christopher (ed.). Early New Testament Apocrypha. Ancient Literature for New Testament Studies 9. Zondervan Academic. pp. 416–424. ISBN 9780310099710.
- Lees, Clare A. (1985). "The 'Sunday Letter' and the 'Sunday Lists'". Anglo-Saxon England. 14: 129–151. doi:10.1017/S0263675100001319.
- Miceli, Calogero A. (2016). "The Epistle of Christ from Heaven: A new translation and introduction". In Burke, Tony; Landau, Brent (eds.). New Testament Apocrypha: More Noncanonical Scriptures. Vol. 1. Eerdmans. ISBN 9780802872890.
- Priebsch, Robert (1936). Letter from Heaven on the Observance of the Lord's Day. Oxford: Basil Blackwell & Mott.
