= Wolfgang Mohr =

Wolfgang Mohr (1907–1991) was a noted German medievalist and Scandinavian scholar. He was Professor of Ancient German Language and Literature at the University of Tübingen. In 1972 Hundsnurscher & Müller edited a festschrift to honour his 65th birthday.

Along with Werner Kohlschmidt and others, he was from 1955 on, an editor of Reallexikon der deutschen Literaturgeschichte (Encyclopaedia of German Literary History).

== Selected publications ==
- Mohr, Wolfgang (1977) Zweimal 'Muspilli'. (Untersuchungen zur deutsch (1977) Literaturgeschichte XVIII), Walter Haug
- Mohr, Wolfgang. (1971) “Iweins Wahnsinn: Die Aventüre Und Ihr ‘Sinn.’” Zeitschrift Für Deutsches Altertum Und Deutsche Literatur 100, no. 1/2: 73–94. http://www.jstor.org/stable/20655674.
- Mohr, Wolfgang (1933). Kenningstudien. Beiträge zur Stilgeschichte der altgermanischen Dichtung. Stuttgart: W. Kohlhammer.
