= Karl Tomaschek =

Austrian literary historian (1828–1878)

Karl Tomaschek (28 September 1828 – 9 September 1878) was an Austrian literary historian, best known for his writings on Friedrich Schiller.

== Biography ==
Tomaschek was born on 28 September 1828 in Jihlava. He studied law at the University of Olomouc, and from 1851 attended lectures on history and philosophy at Vienna, where his instructors included Hermann Bonitz and Heinrich Wilhelm Grauert. In 1855 he obtained his habilitation and subsequently became a professor of German language and literature at the University of Graz. In 1858 he returned to the University of Vienna, where in 1871–72 he served as dean. In 1874 he became a full member of the Vienna Academy of Sciences.

Tomaschek died on 9 September 1878 in Bukovno (today integral part of Jihlava), at the age of 49.

== Selected works ==
- Schiller und Kant, 1857 – Friedrich Schiller and Immanuel Kant.
- Schiller's Wallenstein, (1858, 2nd edition 1886) – Schiller's Wallenstein.
- Schiller in seinem Verhältnisse zur Wissenschaft, 1862 – Schiller and his relationship to science.
- Die neuhochdeutsche classische Dichtung und die Literaturgeschichte, 1875 – Modern High German classical poetry and literary history.
- Johann Anton Leisewitz; ein beitrag zur geschichte der deutschen literatur im XVIII. jahrhundert (with Gregor Kutschera von Aichbergen, 1876) – Johann Anton Leisewitz, a contribution to the history of German literature in the 18th century.
