= Richard Heinzel =

German philologist (1838–1905)

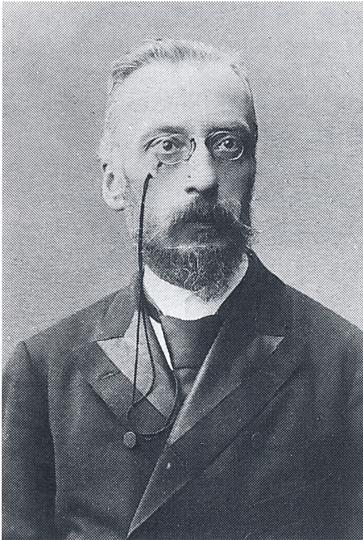
- Born: 17 January 1878; Capodistria, Austria-Hungary
- Died: 3 November 1938 (aged 33); Vienna, Austria-Hungary

Academic background
- Education: University of Vienna
- Academic advisors: Franz Pfeiffer; Johannes Vahlen

Academic work
- Discipline: Germanic studies
- Sub-discipline: German philology
- Institutions: University Vienna
- Notable students: Theodor von Grienberger; Max Hermann Jellinek; Carl von Kraus; Primus Lessiak; Karl Luick; Rudolf Much; Joseph Seemüller; Samuel Singer; Oskar Walzel; Richard Maria Werner
- Main interests: Early Germanic literature; Germanic linguistics

Richard Heinzel (3 November 1838, in Capodistira – 4 April 1905, in Vienna) was an Austrian philologist who specialized in Germanic studies.

== Biography ==
Richard Heinzel studied classical and German philology at the University of Vienna, where his instructors were Franz Pfeiffer and Johannes Vahlen. From 1860 to 1864 he worked as a school teacher at gymnasiums in Trieste, Linz and Vienna, and in 1868 became a professor at the University of Graz. In 1873 he succeeded Wilhelm Scherer as professor of German language and literature at the University of Vienna. In 1874 he became a member of the Vienna Academy of Sciences.

== Selected works ==
- Heinrich von Melk (as editor, 1867) – On Heinrich von Melk.
- Geschichte der niederfränkischen geschäftssprache, 1874 – History of the Lower Franconian language.
- Wortschatz und Sprachformen der wiener Notker-Handschrift, 1875 – Vocabulary and language forms of the Viennese Notker manuscript.
- Über den stil der altgermanischen poesie, 1875 – On the style of Old German poetry.
- Notkers Psalmen nach der Wiener handschrift, with Wilhelm Scherer, 1876 – Notker's psalms; according to the Viennese manuscript.
- Über die endsilben der altnordsichen sprache, 1877 – On the final syllables of Old Norse language.
- Ueber die Hervararsaga, 1877 – On the Hervarar saga.
- Beschreibung der isländischen Saga, 1881 – Description of the Icelandic saga.
- Ueber die Walthersage, 1889 – On the Walther saga.
- Über die ostgothische Heldensage, 1889 – On the East Gothic hero saga.
- Deutsche studien. I. und II, with Wilhelm Scherer (2nd edition, 1891) – German studies.
- Über die französischen Gralromane, 1891 – On the French grail novel.
- Über Wolframs von Eschenbach Parzival, 1893 – On Wolfram von Eschenbach's Parzival.
- Beschreibung des geistlichen Schauspiels im deutschen Mittelalter, 1898 – Description of the spiritual drama in the German Middle Ages.

== See also ==
- Theodor Möbius
- Hugo Gering
- Wolfgang Golther
- Andreas Heusler
- Otto Höfler
