= Sunshine Days =

- The X-Files episode
- Oliver Martin manages to telepathically turn his house into an outdoor landscape. The shot required elaborate effects and green-screening.
- Episode no.: Season 9 Episode 18
- Directed by: Vince Gilligan
- Written by: Vince Gilligan
- Production code: 9ABX18
- Original air date: May 12, 2002
- Running time: 44 minutes

Guest appearances
- David Faustino as Mike Daley; Michael Emerson as Oliver Martin; John Aylward as John Rietz; Tyson Turrou as Blake McCormick; Stephen W. Bridgewater as Henry Jacocks; Arlene Pileggi as Arlene; Damon Kaylor as Orderly; Eric Don as Young Anthony Fogelman; Robbie Troy as "Carol Brady"; Keith Forster as "Mike Brady"; Marice Lynn Rossas "Alice"; Danielle Savre as "Marcia Brady"; Nick Campisano as "Greg Brady"; Stephanie M. Herrera as "Jan Brady"; Nolan Irwin as "Peter Brady"; Sharayah Montgomery as "Cindy Brady"; Jack Bensinger as "Bobby Brady"

Episode chronology
← Previous "Release"	Next → "The Truth"
- The X-Files season 9

"Sunshine Days" is the eighteenth and penultimate episode of the ninth season of the American science fiction television series The X-Files, and the series' 200th episode overall. It originally aired on the Fox network on May 12, 2002. The entry was written and directed by executive producer Vince Gilligan, his thirtieth and last episode as writer for the series. The episode is a "monster-of-the-week" episode, a stand-alone plot which is unconnected to the mythology, or overarching fictional history, of The X-Files. "Sunshine Days" earned a Nielsen household rating of 6.2, was viewed by 6.5 million households, and 10.4 million viewers in its initial broadcast. It received mixed reviews from television critics.

The show centers on FBI special agents who work on cases linked to the paranormal, called X-Files; this season focuses on the investigations of John Doggett (Robert Patrick), Monica Reyes (Annabeth Gish), and Dana Scully (Gillian Anderson).

In this episode, Doggett, Reyes, Walter Skinner (Mitch Pileggi) and Scully stumble on to a bizarre murder case where the main suspect is a man with an unusual obsession for The Brady Bunch. Despite their initial differences—both in investigative style and love of The Brady Bunch—the four of them soon learn that the man's telekinetic ability is the ultimate, undeniable proof of an X-File.

The episode marked Gilligan's second directorial effort, after season seven's "Je Souhaite". The Brady Bunch house set featured in the episode was completely rebuilt. According to Anderson, people came "from all over Los Angeles" to get their pictures taken on the set. In addition, it contained several elaborate effects.

== Plot ==
In Van Nuys, California, two men in their early twenties named Blake and Mike (Tyson Turrou and David Faustino) sneak into a house that Blake claims was where the television sitcom The Brady Bunch was filmed. Inside, they find a perfect recreation of the house from the series; Mike, unsettled, gets worried and leaves, but Blake plods on. Blake is subsequently sent hurtling through the air and falling dead on Mike's car.

John Doggett (Robert Patrick) and Monica Reyes (Annabeth Gish) are called in to investigate. They interview Mike, who claims that Blake died after visiting "the Brady Bunch House". The three speak to the owner, Oliver Martin (Michael Emerson), but upon entering discover that the house looks nothing like the one featured in the teaser. Doggett, feeling something is not right, checks Martin's trashcan and finds asphalt shingles; earlier, on top of Mike's car, Doggett had found a piece of a shingle. He deduces that Blake was thrown through Martin's roof. Later that night, Mike looks into Martin's house and sees the whole Brady family eating dinner. He storms into the house, only to find that the family has disappeared. Suddenly, he is confronted by Martin, who tells him to leave. When he refuses, Mike is thrown through the roof and is embedded in the yard.

Dana Scully (Gillian Anderson) looks through various X-Files and discovers one about a young boy named Anthony Fogelman, who possessed psychokinesis. She learns that Fogelman later changed his name to Oliver Martin. Scully meets with Dr. John Rietz (John Aylward), a parapsychologist who worked with the young Fogelman. Rietz claims that, despite being extremely lonely, Martin was not dangerous and that his power faded as he grew up. Reyes makes the connection that Fogelman changed his name to Oliver based on Cousin Oliver from The Brady Bunch. Scully notes that, in the show, Oliver was portrayed as a "jinx", and the three agents deduce that Fogelman must see himself as one, too.

Doggett and Rietz decide to talk to Fogelman. Initially, he is apprehensive and nearly sends Doggett hurtling through the roof. It is revealed that his powers are temperamental and sometimes he cannot control them, as was the case with the deaths of Mike and Blake. Reyes and Scully show up and convince him that his powers could positively impact the world. The agents take him to Washington, D.C., and demonstrate his powers to Walter Skinner (Mitch Pileggi) by making him float in midair. Suddenly, however, Fogelman collapses. Scully later reports that his body is destroying itself. Doggett realizes that Fogelman must stop using his powers; he notes that his power had faded earlier when Rietz was studying him as a boy. Doggett tells Rietz that his power faded because, with Rietz around, Fogelman did not feel lonely. Rietz visits Fogelman in the hospital, and the two rekindle their friendship, saving Fogelman's life. Scully laments the fact that there may not be any vindication for the X-Files, but that cases like Fogelman's might show that there is proof of "more important things."

== Production ==
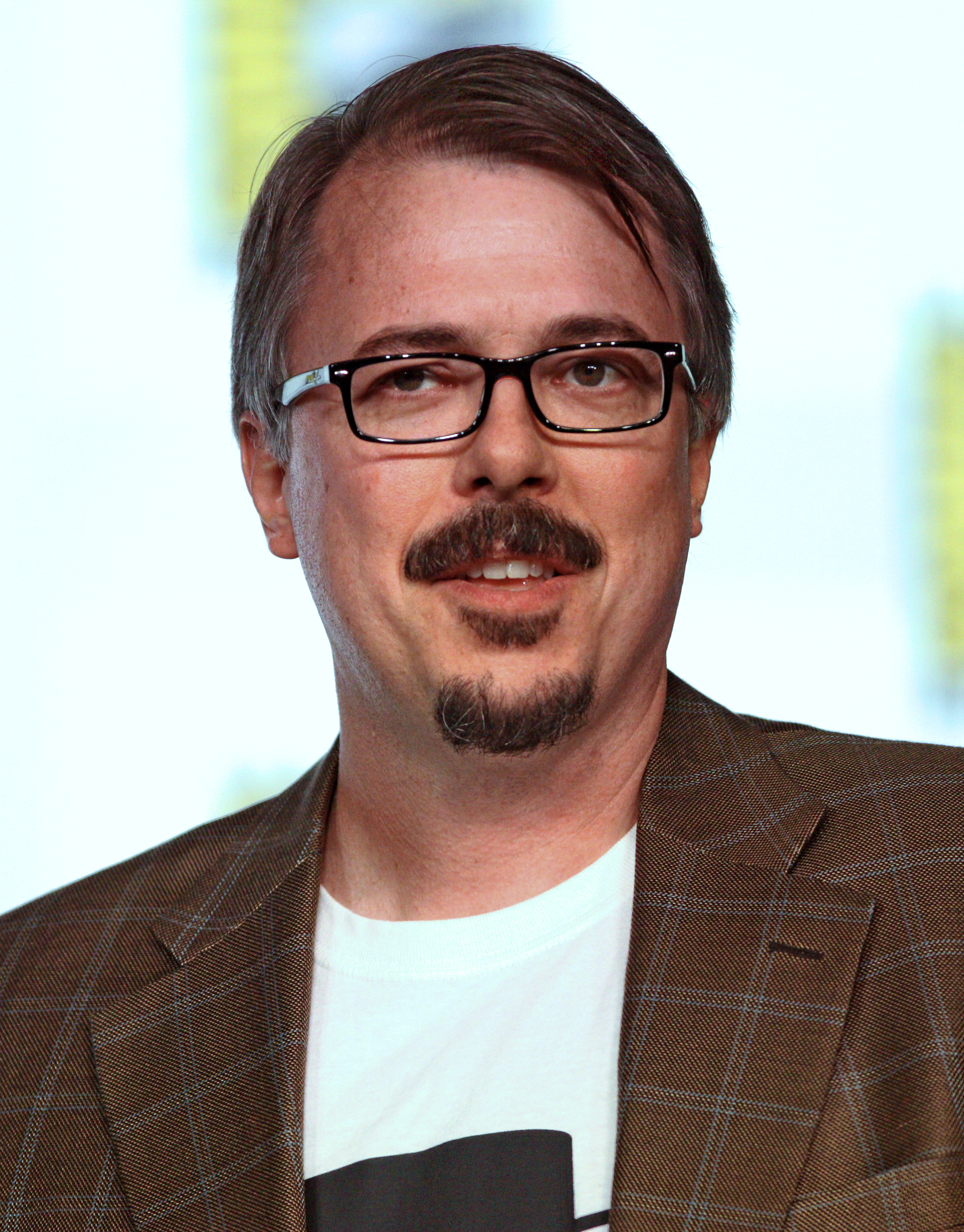
"Sunshine Days" was Vince Gilligan's last writing and directing credit for The X-Files.

"Sunshine Days" was written and directed by executive producer Vince Gilligan. The episode marked Gilligan's second directorial effort, after season seven's "Je Souhaite". Gilligan called the episode his "goodbye to the audience, and goodbye to the characters" because he realized that "would be the last time I'd ever be writing from them." Prior to the show's 2016 revival, "Sunshine Days" was planned to be the final "monster-of-the-week" entry in the series; the show's original finale, "The Truth" would deal with the series' overarching alien colonization mythology.

The elaborate Brady Bunch house set featured in the episode was built completely by the production crew, according to series co-star Gillian Anderson. She recounts the fact that, due to the original set having been long ago disassembled, people came "from all over Los Angeles" to get their pictures taken on the set. Anderson, who was a fan of popular sitcoms made by Sherwood Schwartz, like Gilligan's Island and The Brady Bunch, called the experience "wild".

The scene in which Fogelman's house turns into an outside field was created using Chroma Keying. A shot of both The Brady Bunch house and an outside field were filmed. Then, the actors were filmed against a blue screen. A matte of the scenes was cut and the scenes were composited. Because the shot was an extended scene, Paul Rabwin later noted that the effects were "a little tricky" to get right; Rabwin noted that the shots' mattes had to cover the "little strands of hair" on Anderson's head, because missing the strands is what "gives [the effect] away".

== Broadcast and reception ==
"Sunshine Days" originally aired on the Fox network on May 12, 2002, and was first broadcast in the United Kingdom on BBC Two on March 16, 2003. The episode's initial broadcast was viewed by approximately 6.5 million households (Note: At the time of airing, the estimated number of households was 105.5 million. Thus, 5.8 percent of 105.5 million is 6.1 million households.) and by 10.4 million viewers. "Sunshine Days" earned a Nielsen household rating of 6.2, meaning that roughly 6.2 percent of all television-equipped households were tuned in to the episode. It was the forty-sixth most watched episode of television that aired during the week ending May 12. Fox promoted the episode with the promise that it was the "most bizarre" episode of The X-Files to ever have been shown.

Critical reception to "Sunshine Days" was mixed. Aaron Kinney from Salon magazine was critical of the producers' idea to air the entry as the penultimate episode leading up to the heavily-promoted series finale. Kinney pointed out that the episode had little to do with the show's overarching storyline, but it was nevertheless touted as part of The X-Files "Endgame" promotion strategy. Jessica Morgan from Television Without Pity gave the episode a mixed review and awarded it a "C" grade. She sarcastically wrote, "nine years of mytharc to start to wrap up. And so the penultimate episode of The X-Files, naturally, is devoted to The Brady Bunch." Robert Shearman and Lars Pearson, in their book Wanting to Believe: A Critical Guide to The X-Files, Millennium & The Lone Gunmen, rated the episode three-and-a-half stars out of five. The two noted that the episode "is not one of Gilligan's very best stories", citing issues with its tone and its characterization of Oliver Martin. The two, however, did praise Gilligan's humanized style, writing, "he gives Scully the proof of the paranormal she's been needing" but shows that the most important "things to care about in life" are "humans". M.A. Crang, in his book Denying the Truth: Revisiting The X-Files after 9/11, said that "the central story falls a bit flat", but the episode worked well as a "paean to medium of television itself" and he felt it was an appropriate vehicle for the series' penultimate installment. In 2016 Ira Madison III of Vulture ranked all the episodes in the series' original run. He placed Sunshine Days at number 9, writing, "Ultimately, The X-Files is a show about finding whatever you believe your family is. The series’ mission statement is never as beautifully summed up as in this episode written and directed by Vince Gilligan...If the series had ended on this episode, canceled before it could reach a “proper” conclusion, it would have been one the best series finales in television. As it stands, this penultimate episode of The X-Files is simply just one of the series’ finest big-picture moments."

== Bibliography ==
- Fraga, Erica (2010). LAX-Files: Behind the Scenes with the Los Angeles Cast and Crew. CreateSpace. ISBN 9781451503418.
- Hurwitz, Matt; Knowles, Chris (2008). The Complete X-Files. Insight Editions. ISBN 978-1933784809.
- Kessenich, Tom (2002). Examination: An Unauthorized Look at Seasons 6–9 of the X-Files. Trafford Publishing. ISBN 1553698126.
- Shearman, Robert; Pearson, Lars (2009). Wanting to Believe: A Critical Guide to The X-Files, Millennium & The Lone Gunmen. Mad Norwegian Press. ISBN 978-0975944691.

This article incorporates material derived from the "Sunshine Days" article on the X-Files wiki at Fandom (formerly Wikia) and is licensed under the Creative Commons Attribution-Share Alike 3.0 License (July 21, 2012).
