= All things =

"all things"
- The X-Files episode
- During a mystical reverie, Scully is able to diagnose Daniel Waterston's heart condition. The scene required footage of Nicolas Surovy to be superimposed with video of a prosthetic beating heart.
- Episode no.: Season 7 Episode 17
- Directed by: Gillian Anderson
- Written by: Gillian Anderson
- Production code: 7ABX17
- Original air date: April 9, 2000
- Running time: 45 minutes

Guest appearances
- Colleen Flynn as Colleen Azar; Stacy Haiduk as Maggie Waterston; Stephen Hornyak as Dr. Paul Kopeikan; Victoria Faerber as First Nurse; Nicolas Surovy as Dr. Daniel Waterston; Carol Banker as Carol; Elayn Taylor as Second Nurse; Cheryl White as Third Nurse; Scott Vance as Healer

Episode chronology
← Previous "Chimera"	Next → "Brand X"
- The X-Files season 7

"all things" is the seventeenth episode of the seventh season of the American science fiction television series The X-Files. Written and directed by lead actress Gillian Anderson, it first aired on April 9, 2000, on the Fox network. The episode is unconnected to the wider mythology of The X-Files and functions as a "Monster-of-the-Week" story. Watched by 12.18 million people, the initial broadcast had a Nielsen household rating of 7.1. The episode received mixed reviews from critics; many called the dialogue pretentious and criticized the characterization of Scully. However, viewer response was generally positive.

The series centers on Federal Bureau of Investigation (FBI) special agents Fox Mulder (David Duchovny) and Dana Scully (Anderson) who work on cases linked to the paranormal, called "X-Files". Mulder is a believer in the paranormal. The skeptical Scully was initially assigned to debunk his work, but the two have developed a deep friendship. In this episode, a series of coincidences lead Scully to meet Dr. Daniel Waterston (Nicolas Surovy), a married man with whom she had an affair while at medical school. After Waterston slips into a coma, Scully puts aside her skepticism and seeks out alternative medicine to save Waterston.

"all things" is the only episode of the series written and directed by Anderson, as well as the first episode of The X-Files to be directed by a woman. The episode makes heavy use of "The Sky Is Broken", a song from Moby's 1999 album Play, as well as a gong. The episode has been analyzed for its themes of pragmatism and feminist philosophy.

== Plot ==
FBI special agent Dana Scully (Gillian Anderson) is getting dressed in front of a mirror. As she leaves, her colleague Fox Mulder (David Duchovny) lies in his bed, half of his body covered by bedsheets. The narrative flashes back to a few days earlier: Scully arrives at a hospital and, after a series of coincidences, meets her former professor, Daniel Waterston (Nicolas Surovy), with whom she had an affair while attending medical school. He is ill and suffering from an undiagnosed heart condition. She questions whether she made the right decision to leave him and abandon her medical career to pursue a career in the FBI. She meets Waterston's daughter, Maggie (Stacy Haiduk), who is extremely resentful of Scully for the effect she had on Waterston's family.

Mulder—on his way to England investigating heart chakra-shaped crop circles—calls Scully and asks her to meet a contact of his, Colleen Azar (Colleen Flynn), to obtain some information. As Scully speaks to Mulder on her cellphone while driving her car, a woman appears on a crosswalk. Scully brakes hard to avoid hitting the woman. As she does so, she narrowly avoids colliding with a semi-truck. She realizes that, had the woman not stepped in her path, the truck would have killed her. When she later arrives at the house of Azar, she observes that Scully is going through a personal crisis and tries to offer her guidance, but Scully is dismissive.

Later, Scully returns to apologize to Azar and agrees to listen to her ideas. Azar shares her knowledge of Buddhism, the concept of the collective unconscious, and the idea of personal auras. Azar believes these concepts might explain these strange occurrences. While visiting Waterston, he nearly dies but Scully saves him using a defibrillator; however, this also puts him in a coma. After a confrontation with Maggie at the hospital over what happened to her father, Scully walks through Chinatown. Seeing the woman who appeared earlier at the crosswalk, she follows her to a small Buddhist temple before the mysterious woman seemingly vanishes. Inside the temple, Scully has a vision of what is ailing Waterston. She returns to the hospital with Azar to visit Waterston.

Azar and a healer provide alternative treatment for Waterston, who fully recovers. He announces that he still wants a relationship with Scully, but she realizes she is no longer the same person she was those many years ago and rejects him. As she sits outside the hospital on a bench, Scully thinks that she sees the mysterious woman again, but it turns out to be Mulder. Later, the two agents sit in Mulder's apartment talking about the events of the last few days. Mulder begins to speak more existentially about what transpired, implying that fate has brought them together but, when he turns to look at Scully, he sees that she has fallen asleep.

== Production ==
=== Conception and writing ===
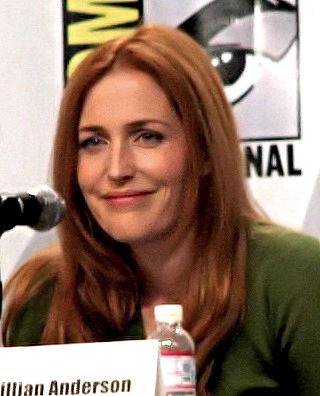
"all things" marked the first and only time Gillian Anderson directed and wrote an episode of The X-Files.

Sometime during the sixth season of The X-Files, Anderson approached series creator Chris Carter and asked if she could write a script for an episode that explored her own interest in "Buddhism and the power of spiritual healing"; ultimately, she wanted to write a script in which Scully pursued a "deeply personal X-File, one in which [she] is taken down a spiritual path when logic fails her". She wrote the basic outline of what became "all things" in one sitting, which Carter approved due to the "personal and quiet" nature of the story. Anderson's first draft of "all things" was 15 pages too long, and it did not feature a concluding fourth act. Carter and executive producer Frank Spotnitz thus began to work with Anderson to finish the episode, although Carter and Spotnitz later acknowledged that the majority of the script "was all Gillian".

Despite her satisfaction with the final version, Anderson regrets a handful of the "necessary" script changes, most notably, the addition that Scully and Waterston's affair was intimate. In the original script, the two came "close to having an affair", but Scully ended the relationship when she discovered that Waterston was married. In the commentary for the episode, Anderson elaborated on Scully and Waterston's original backstory: after Scully and Waterston came close to having an affair, Scully left to study at Quantico to become an FBI agent. After she left, Waterston became depressed, and his family began to suspect the affair. The emotional turmoil was too much for Waterston's wife, who killed herself, which made Waterston's daughter, Maggie, resent Scully, as shown in the finished episode. Anderson believed that the removal of this backstory made it hard for the audience to understand Maggie's disgust with Scully.

When Anderson first wrote the episode, she did not intend to imply that Mulder and Scully had had sex; Spotnitz and the production crew, however, felt it was natural to suggest that their relationship had evolved into a romantic one. The idea of heart chakra crop circles was included because Anderson wanted "whatever Mulder was involved in that took him away from me, away from Washington, to somehow tie into what it was that I was going through—the journey that I was going through". As such, Anderson dedicated much of her time researching both crop circles and heart chakras, but she later gave additional credit to Spotnitz, who aided her in the research process.

=== Directing and music ===
I was happy that it had an essence of what I was intending. ... It veered quite a bit from what my original intention for it was ... but the overall experience was a good one.

— Gillian Anderson, expressing her satisfaction with the episode

Around the same time that she approached Carter about writing an episode, Anderson was being solicited by television networks, who were interested in having her direct shows. She, however, had never directed before and decided that she would first helm an episode of The X-Files before working on other series. Consequently, when Anderson pitched her initial script idea, she also expressed her desire to direct the episode. Carter accepted her story, but did not appoint her as director until all the revisions and rewrites had been completed. Anderson worked with series director Kim Manners for the majority of the episode, and he assigned Anderson directing exercises—such as making a list of shots for every scene—to get her familiar with the demands of directing. This episode of The X-Files was the first to be directed by a woman.

Anderson's directing helped to energize the production, and the crew worked harder than usual to ensure that everything was in order for her: Production designer Corey Kaplan went out of his way to find a Buddhist temple at Anderson's request, and casting director Rick Millikan helped Anderson choose the appropriate actors. Millikan later said that he particularly enjoyed working with Anderson, because "it was fun for [him] to watch her go through the casting process because it was all new to her." On set, Anderson's directing style was described as "right on the money" by Marc Shapiro in his book all things: The Official Guide to The X-Files, Volume 6. He later wrote that "Anderson wielded a deft hand in her directorial debut, prodding the actors to her will, making decisions on the fly, and handling the complex special effects sequences". Fans of the show later wrote to express their appreciation of Anderson's directing abilities. Anderson was also involved in post-production editing, during which she was forced to cut the final conversation scene between Scully and Daniel Waterston down by about 10 minutes.

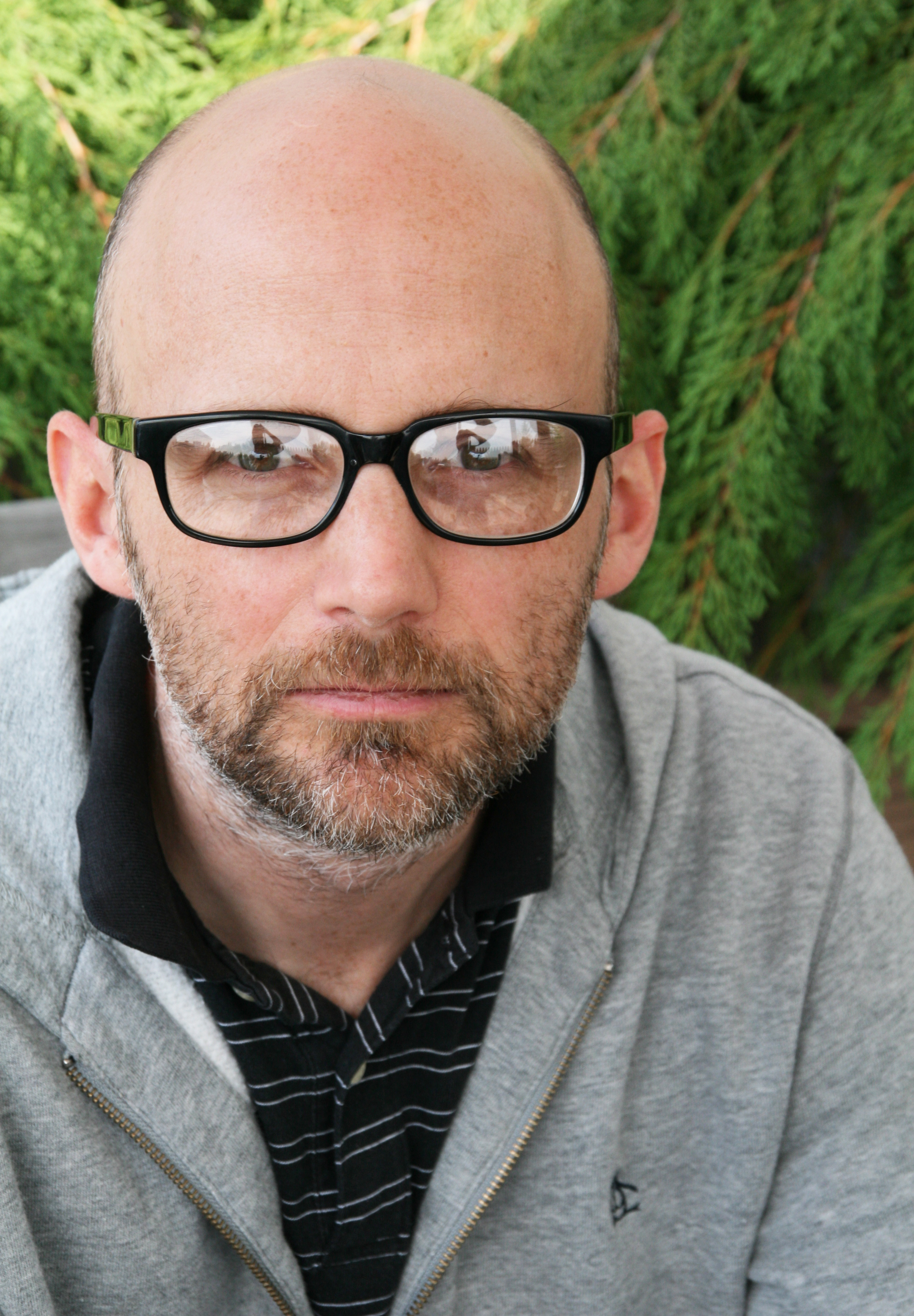
"all things" featured the song "The Sky Is Broken" from electronica musician Moby's 1999 album Play.

The meditation scene required clips from previous episodes to appear in flashback. Initially, Paul Rabwin and the special effects crew arranged the necessary scenes and placed them in animated bubbles. However, the crew was unhappy with the bubbles and felt that they were too "hokey", so they adopted a more standard slit-scan effect. In order to create the sequence of Scully visualizing Waterston's heart condition, Nicolas Surovy had to lie naked on a platform surrounded by a blue screen. A shot of a prosthetic beating heart was then crafted and filmed separately, and via motion control, the two shots were combined into a composite whole.

Anderson wanted to include "The Sky Is Broken", a song from Moby's 1999 album Play in the episode, as she felt that the song's lyrics "fit with [the] idea that was unfolding for the script". Anderson crafted the first shot after the opening credits, which involved Scully getting ready while water dripped from a sink, to create a "continuation of sound, rhythmic sound", because it was important to the show's musical aspect. Anderson and series composer Mark Snow worked together in post-production; after filming, she sent Snow several CDs of music and asked him for compositions that were similar in style and feel. A certain melody that the two worked on later became "Scully's Theme", which was not broadcast until the eighth season episode "Within". "all things" also featured the use of the gong, an instrument that Anderson called "very Tibetan" and "appropriate for this episode".

== Themes ==
In the chapter "Scully as a Pragmatist Feminist" of the book The Philosophy of The X-Files, Erin McKenna argues that "all things" represents an "important shift" in Scully's approach to science, knowledge acquisition, and the pursuit of the truth. She reasons that the events of the episode open Scully's mind to new ways of knowing, specifically citing "auras, chakras, visions ... and the importance of coincidence". McKenna notes that Scully's shift in perspective is a shift to American pragmatism, a belief that reality is ever-changing. Pragmatists believe "the truth is out there"—the motto of the series—in a manner similar to Mulder's. In "all things", Scully begins to embrace pragmatism, although she still clings to her skeptic roots. Mixing the two, Scully evolves from a mere skeptic who demands proof to validate a truth, to an empiricist who wants proof, but is open to other perspectives.

In addition, McKenna reasons that "all things" is heavily influenced by feminist philosophy and epistemology, schools of thought that try to criticize or re-evaluate the ideas of traditional philosophy and epistemology from within a feminist framework. According to McKenna, feminism rejects dualistic ways of thinking, especially "typical male/female dualism". Feminist philosophy, instead, calls for a pluralistic way of thinking, noting that there are many consistent sets of truths about the world. In the episode, Scully starts out "sure of her more rational scientific view and approach". As the episode progresses, however, she decides to branch out. Eventually, she brings in a spirit healer to "corroborate or nullify the new beliefs she is encountering". Despite dabbling in mysticism, a field generally stereotyped as feminine by the patriarchy, Scully engages in "protracted inquiry", examining all sides of the issue, in order to return Waterston to health.

When Mulder and Scully talk at the end of the episode, Mulder questions the fact that he left "town for two days and [Scully] spoke to God in a Buddhist temple and God spoke back". Scully retorts that, "I didn't say God spoke back". McKenna proposes that this is an example of Scully's rational scientific approach meshing with her newer, feministic pragmatism. The two modes of understanding are not "to be seen ... as competing systems, but as complementary, as are Scully and Mulder themselves". McKenna concludes that this is represented in the opening scene, in which Mulder and Scully are implied to have had sex. This is meant as a metaphor, showing the full merging of Scully's and Mulder's different philosophies into pragmatic feminism.

In her academic monograph on the series, Theresa L. Geller considers "all things" at length while discussing the show's sexual politics. Geller contends that Anderson uses her directorial debut to make a feminist intervention into the character of Scully, noting that the episode's title is "possibly a comment on the earlier Scully episode, 'All Souls' that cast Scully yet again as self-sacrificing mother" while "all things" "allowed Anderson to create a story that shifted Scully's arc from the immaterial religiosity of Catholicism to a more material, embodied spirituality, from souls to things". Geller analyzes the episode in the context of Anderson's long-standing engagement with female fans, arguing that it "offers a narrative that acknowledges shippers identification with Scully not as an object of seduction, but as a figure directly impacted by women and changed by what she learns when she listens to them".

Geller sees this intervention as directly tied to the episode's narrative peculiarity: "Although neither FBI-related nor paranormal, 'all things' suggests—and models—ways we can learn from women's knowledge, even when it is intuitive, 'irrational', and embodied. To do so, however, meant a shift in form, in genre." "all things" expands the generic vocabulary of The X-Files by including a scene from Vittorio De Sica's 1953 woman-centered melodrama Indiscretion of an American Wife, a reference that "underscores the generic conventions to the 'pathetic impulses behind this bargaining' women do in the romance", but does so only to highlight that, "in this episode, Scully's desires are catalyzed, ultimately, not by men in her life, but by women she does not know—much like the women fans of The X-Files that have shaped the show".

== Broadcast and reception ==
The episode originally aired in the United States on the Fox network on April 9, 2000, and was first broadcast in the United Kingdom on Sky1 on July 9, 2000. In the U.S., "all things" was watched by 12.18 million viewers. It earned a Nielsen household rating of 7.5, with an 11 share, meaning that roughly 7.5 percent of all television-equipped households, and 11 percent of households watching television, tuned into the episode. In the U.K., "all things" was seen by 580,000 viewers, making it the seventh-most watched program on Sky1 for that week. On May 13, 2003, the episode was released on DVD as part of the complete seventh season.

Emily St. James of The A.V. Club awarded the episode a "C" and called it "a curious failure". She felt that the writing was "pretentious" and composed of "some weird, weird bullshit". St. James wrote that, although the episode was unsuccessful, there was something so "pure and unadorned at its center that I can't outright hate it". Furthermore, she admired the show and Anderson for "making the attempt". Kevin Silber of Space.com gave the episode a negative review, critical of the script and characterization. He said, "nothing much seems to happen, and what does occur is substantially driven by coincidence and arbitrariness". He did not like Azar and disapproved of Scully's philosophical "reverie", calling it "facile, and hard to reconcile with the determined rationalism she's displayed over the years in the face of events no less strange than those that occur here".

In their book Wanting to Believe: A Critical Guide to The X-Files, Millennium & The Lone Gunmen, Robert Shearman rated the episode one star out of five, calling the premise and characters dull. The author criticized Anderson for looking at the "minutiae of life too intensely", which made many of the actors and actresses come off as ciphers. Furthermore, Shearman was critical of Anderson's directing style, calling it "pretentious", noting that the plot's significance was drowned out by unnecessary artistic flourishes and needless pizzazz. Paula Vitaris from CFQ gave the episode a negative review, awarding it one star out of four. She called Anderson's directing "heavy-handed" and bemoaned the storyline because it "plays havoc with Scully's motivations and character as established in the past seven years".

Not all reviews were negative. Kinney Littlefield of the Orange County Register wrote that the "wistful, meditative episode" was "not bad for Anderson's first directing effort". He did, however, comment that it was not as "sly as the episode about an alien baseball player that Duchovny directed". The Michigan Daily writer Melissa Runstrom, in a review of the seventh season, called the episode "interesting".

While the episode received lukewarm reviews from critics, fans of the show reacted generally positively to "all things", and the show's producers received calls and letters from viewers stating that they "loved the vulnerability and quiet determination that Scully revealed in the unusual episode".

== Works cited ==
- Anderson, Gillian (2003). "'all things': Commentary". The X-Files: The Complete Seventh Season (DVD feature). Los Angeles: 20th Century Fox.
- Gatens, Moira (1991). Feminism and Philosophy: Perspectives on Difference and Equality. Bloomington, IN: Indiana University Press. ISBN 978-0253281906.
- Geller, Theresa (2016). The X-Files. Detroit: Wayne State University Press. ISBN 978-0814339428.
- McKenna, Erin (2007). "Scully as a Pragmatist Feminist". In Kowalski, Dean A (ed.). The Philosophy of The X-Files. Lexington, KY: University Press of Kentucky. ISBN 978-0813124544.
- Shapiro, Marc (2000). all things: The Official Guide to the X-Files Volume 6. New York City: Harper Prism. ISBN 978-0061076114.
- Shearman, Robert (2009). Wanting to Believe: A Critical Guide to The X-Files, Millennium & The Lone Gunmen. Des Moines, IA: Mad Norwegian Press. ISBN 978-0975944691.
