= Hollywood A.D. =

- The X-Files episode
- Mulder and Scully, aghast, watch the finished film, The Lazarus Bowl. Many critics commented on the "self-referential" tone of the episode, facilitated by use of the movie.
- Episode no.: Season 7 Episode 19
- Directed by: David Duchovny
- Written by: David Duchovny
- Production code: 7ABX18
- Original air date: April 30, 2000
- Running time: 44 minutes

Guest appearances
- Mitch Pileggi as Walter Skinner; Garry Shandling as himself; Téa Leoni as herself; Wayne Federman as Wayne Federman; Harris Yulin as Cardinal O'Fallon; Tony Amendola as Cigarette Smoking Pontiff (uncredited); Paul Lieber as Micah Hoffman; Bill Dow as Chuck Burks; Tim Roe as Zombie; Barry K. Thomas as Sugar Bear; Tina M. Ameduri as Tina the Craft Service Woman; Bill Millar as Director; Minnie Driver as Audience member; David Alan Grier as Audience member

Episode chronology
← Previous "Brand X"	Next → "Fight Club"
- The X-Files season 7

"Hollywood A.D." is the nineteenth episode of the seventh season of the American science fiction television series The X-Files. It premiered on the Fox network in the United States on April 30, 2000. The episode is a "Monster-of-the-Week" story, unconnected to the series' wider mythology. "Hollywood A.D." earned a Nielsen household rating of 7.7, being watched by 12.88 million people in its initial broadcast. The episode was met with largely positive reviews, with many critics approving of the episode's humorous nature.

The show centers on FBI special agents Fox Mulder (David Duchovny) and Dana Scully (Gillian Anderson) who work on cases linked to the paranormal, called X-Files. Mulder is a believer in the paranormal, while the skeptical Scully has been assigned to debunk his work. In this episode, Wayne Federman, an entrepreneurial Hollywood producer and college friend of Walter Skinner (Mitch Pileggi) picks up the idea for a film based on the X-Files, however Mulder and Scully find that the level of realism in their fictional portrayal is somewhat questionable. Meanwhile, during the filming of the movie, Mulder and Scully research the mysterious "Lazarus Bowl", an artifact that supposedly has the exact words that Jesus Christ spoke to raise Lazarus from the dead recorded on its surface.

"Hollywood A.D." was written and directed by series star David Duchovny, his second writing and directing credit after the sixth season episode "The Unnatural." The episode—written with a "self-referential" tone—features myriad guest stars, including, most notably, Garry Shandling and Téa Leoni, who portray Mulder and Scully, respectively, in the episode's fictional movie. Leoni herself was also Duchovny's then-wife. The episode itself contains several in-jokes and references deliberately placed by Duchovny.

== Plot ==
Walter Skinner's college friend, Hollywood producer Wayne Federman, is involved in a film project about the FBI. During Federman's research phase, Skinner gives him access to Fox Mulder and Dana Scully, who are investigating the attempted murder of Cardinal O'Fallon. Federman tags along and constantly interrupts the agents. While searching the catacombs of O'Fallon's church, Mulder finds the remains of Micah Hoffman, a missing 1960s counter-culturalist. Searching Hoffman's apartment, they find bombs and counterfeiting tools, as well as a forged gospel of Mary Magdalene. Mulder and Federman return to the catacombs, finding several skeletons and pieces of the forged gospel. Federman wanders off and stumbles upon animated bones, who attempt to assemble a shattered piece of pottery. He panics and leaves the scene.

As they examine the pottery, Scully tells Mulder the story of the "Lazarus Bowl", in which the aunt of Lazarus had been making a clay bowl when Jesus Christ resurrected him. The words of Christ were then recorded in the grooves of the bowl, much like a phonograph record. Mulder brings the relic to Chuck Burks, who, after performing a sonic analysis, discovers voices in Aramaic: In one portion part of the audio, one man commands another to rise from the dead. The other contains lyrics from "I am the Walrus" by The Beatles plus an allusion to the Paul is dead urban legend.

Mulder visits O'Fallon, who admits he bought the forged gospel from Hoffman, believing it was real. Meanwhile, during Hoffman's autopsy, Scully experiences a hallucination wherein he comes back to life on the operating table and begins talking. Later, at the church, Scully has a hallucination of Hoffman in Jesus' place on a large crucifix. Mulder arrests O'Fallon for Hoffman's murder, but Hoffman walks in, unscathed. He tells the agents that while he initially created the forgeries to make money, he came to believe he was the reincarnation of Christ, and bombed the church to get rid of the "blasphemous" forgeries. Skinner suspends Scully and Mulder for four weeks because of the mix-up. Sixteen months later, O'Fallon kills Hoffman in a murder-suicide. As such, the X-File is never truly solved.

During their suspension, Mulder and Scully venture to Hollywood to view the production of Federman's film. It is revealed that Federman's movie was called The Lazarus Bowl, with Garry Shandling playing Mulder and Téa Leoni playing Scully. After filming is done, Mulder and Scully attend a screening of the film with Skinner, but are disappointed with how the movie portrays them and the case. The agents leave the set holding hands, presumably on their way to dinner with the FBI credit card Skinner gave them after watching the movie, hinting at the continued romantic relationship between them. As they leave, the dead who were resting underneath the film set are revived and begin to dance passionately, reinforcing a theory Mulder made earlier in the episode.

== Production ==
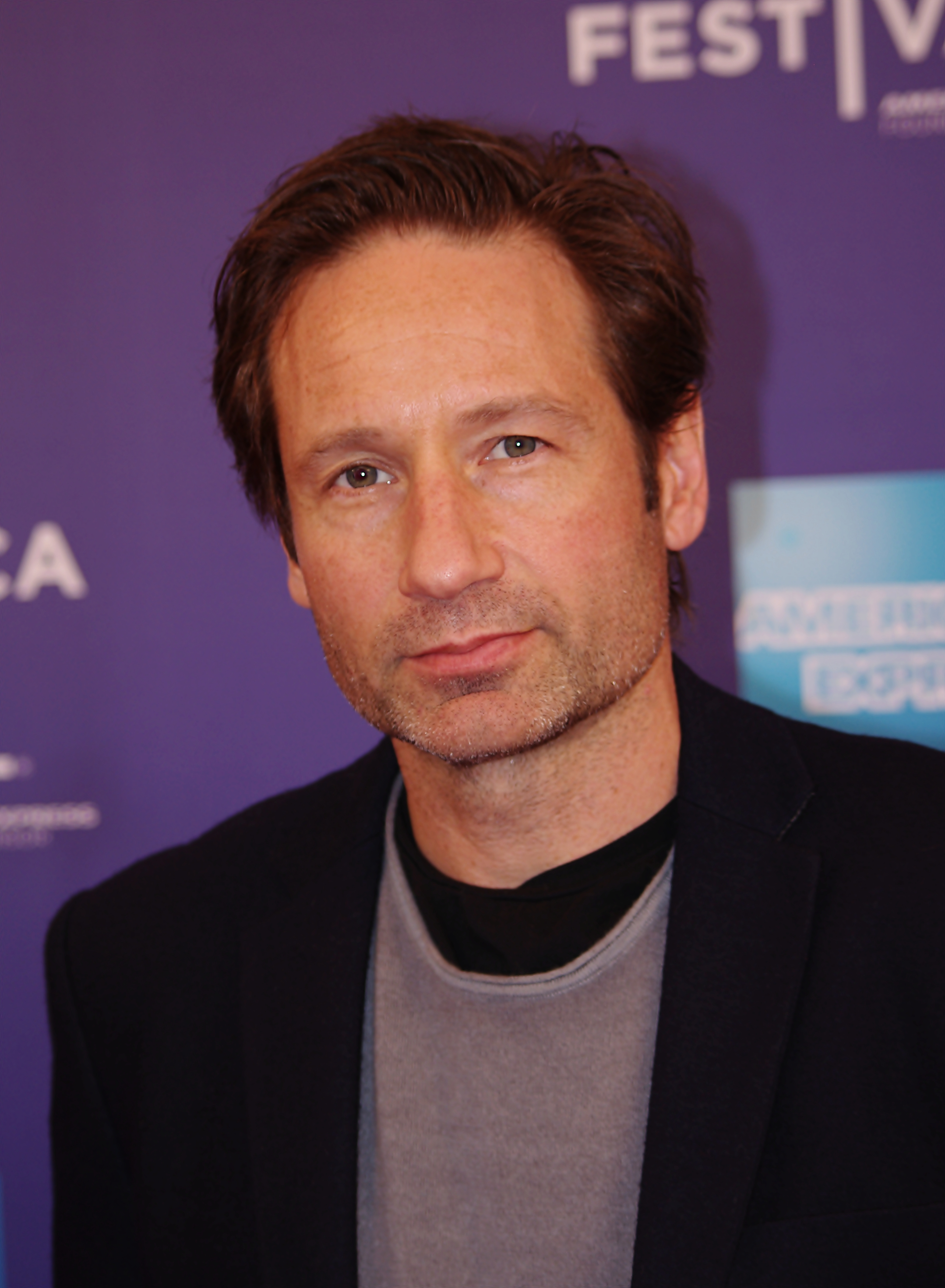
"Hollywood A.D." was written and directed by series star David Duchovny.

=== Writing and filming ===
"Hollywood A.D." was written and directed by series co-star David Duchovny. After receiving largely positive feedback about his last creation, sixth-season episode "The Unnatural", Duchovny approached executive producer Frank Spotnitz about the possibility of writing another. Spotnitz gave him the go-ahead and was soon given a rough copy of the script. Series creator Chris Carter was very happy with the story, calling it "a smart, [...], quirky, and intelligent idea" and he later described it as "outside the norm, even for The X-Files." After Carter approved the script, Duchovny also took on an active role in pre-production.

There was a "considerable" amount of stunt work, choreographing, and makeup required during the production of "Hollywood A.D." Two stunt doubles were hired for the scene in which Shandling and Leoni roll down a hill into a coffin, and other stunt men were cast in non-stunt related jobs, including several who were "transform[ed]" into zombies—a tedious process that took five hours to complete. The dance sequence at the end of the episode reportedly took two complete days to film. The first day was shot during active production, and the second was shot on the weekend. The latter of the two made use of chroma keying, and when the two scenes were finished, they were composited in post-production.

=== Casting ===
Duchovny cast several of The X-Files' technical crew in the episode: Tina M. Amedrui, the show's actual craft services woman, portrayed Tina, the craft service woman in Wayne Federman's movie. Bill Roe, the show's photography director, was cast as a vegetarian zombie. Assistant director Barry K. Thomas was cast as one of the men on the movie set, Paul Rabwin was cast as a producer, and special effects coordinator Bill Millar was cast as the movie's director. Duchovny also cast his brother, Daniel, as the assistant director. Thanks to their part in this episode, several of Duchovny's family members and friends were able to apply for their Screen Actor's Guild card, making them eligible for health insurance.

Téa Leoni, who portrayed a fictionalized version of herself portraying Scully in Wayne Federman's movie, was married to David Duchovny when this episode was filmed, a decision casting director Rick Millikan considered "clever." Duchovny also cast his friend and fellow actor Garry Shandling as a fictionalized version of himself portraying Mulder in the movie. Shandling had originally been asked to play Morris Fletcher in the sixth-season episode "Dreamland", but he was unavailable at the time. The reference to Garry Shandling having a crush on Mulder came from a recurring joke from the TV show The Larry Sanders Show, starring Shandling. (In the recurring joke, David Duchovny has a romantic interest in Shandling's character.)

The joke about Mulder wanting Richard Gere to be in The Lazarus Bowl stemmed from the fact that Duchovny's acting was often compared to Gere's. Duchovny explained: "We used to always have the joke on set that when they do the movie it's going to be Richard Gere and Jodie Foster [playing Mulder and Scully]. So I originally wrote the teaser for Richard Gere and Jodie Foster and I just started to think about it and you know, it's so much funnier with Garry and Téa." The scene featuring the movie premiere featured several uncredited celebrity cameos, including: Minnie Driver, David Alan Grier, and Chris Carter himself.

== Broadcast and reception ==
"Hollywood A.D." first aired in the United States on April 30, 2000. This episode earned a Nielsen rating of 7.7, with a 12 share, meaning that roughly 7.7 percent of all television-equipped households, and 12 percent of households watching television, were tuned in to the episode. It was viewed by 12.88 million viewers. The episode aired in the United Kingdom and Ireland on Sky1 on May 7, 2000, and received 0.80 million viewers, making it the second most watched episode that week.

Critical reception to "Hollywood A.D." was mostly positive. The Montreal Gazette named the episode the sixth best stand-alone X-Files episode, writing that "Despite taxing our stomach for self-reflexive comedy, this David Duchovny scripted and directed episode manages to deliver some of the greatest laughs of the series." Rob Bricken from Topless Robot named "Hollywood A.D." the seventh funniest X-Files episode. Sarah Kendzior from 11th Hour Magazine wrote that, "My favorite [episode] this year may well be 'Hollywood A.D.', an ambitious, often ingenious and occasionally flawed sophomore effort concerning the entertainment industry, religion, and pretty much everything in between." Rich Rosell from DigitallyObsessed.com awarded the episode 5 out of 5 stars and wrote that "[the] scene from the 'movie' where Shandling/Mulder faces off against The Cigarette Smoking Pontiff, and his army of sniper zombies, is classic stuff, and earns 'Hollywood A.D.' high marks." Kenneth Silber from Space.com, while criticizing the episode for reveling in parody, noted that the episode was entertaining, writing, "'Hollywood A.D.' is a parody and, as such, will be unsatisfying to the many X-Files viewers, including this long-suffering reviewer, who'd like to see the series culminate in a dramatic, multi-episode denouement of its 'mythology arc'. Nonetheless, this episode has merit as a witty and imaginative parody."

Tom Kessenich, in his book Examinations, gave the episode a relatively positive review. He wrote, "'Hollywood A.D.' was Duchovny's nudge-nudge, wink-wink writing-directing effort for this season. [...] Duchovny did not fail to deliver an episode that truly reflected his own wit and intelligence. All the while remaining true to the spirit of the show that made him famous." Zack Handlen of The A.V. Club awarded the episode a "B+", and wrote that it "is muddled and frequently so in love with just being weird for weird’s sake that everybody forgets we need at least a little justification to pull everything together in the end." He also called it "a hard episode not to love, frankly." Handlen felt that the humor and sweetness helped to make the episode a success. He also wrote that Mulder and Scully's dynamic worked towards the episode's favor.

== In popular culture ==
On the "Killer Cable Snaps" episode of the popular science television series MythBusters, which aired on October 11, 2006, the possibility that audio could be transcribed onto pottery was tested (the myth received a "busted" result). Clips from "Hollywood A.D." were shown during the segment.

In a March 2021 interview with Emiko Tamagawa on the National Public Radio program "Here & Now," David Duchovny said that his 2021 novel Truly Like Lightning originated in research he had done about the Church of Jesus Christ of Latter-day Saints while writing this episode.

== Bibliography ==
- Kessenich, Tom (2002). Examination: An Unauthorized Look at Seasons 6–9 of the X-Files. Trafford Publishing. ISBN 1-55369-812-6.
- Meisler, Andy (2000). The End and the Beginning: The Official Guide to the X-Files Volume 5. Harper Prism. ISBN 0-06-107595-7.
- Shapiro, Marc (2000). All Things: The Official Guide to the X-Files Volume 6. Harper Prism. ISBN 0-06-107611-2.
