= John Aylward =

American actor (1946–2022)

- Born: November 7, 1946; Seattle, Washington, U.S.
- Died: May 16, 2022 (aged 75); Seattle, Washington, U.S.
- Occupation: Actor
- Years active: 1976–2020

John Aylward (November 7, 1946 – May 16, 2022) was an American actor.

He was best known for playing the former DNC chairman Barry Goodwin on the NBC television series The West Wing and for playing Dr. Donald Anspaugh on the NBC television series ER. He also provided the voice for Dr. Arne Magnusson in Half-Life 2: Episode Two.

== Life and career ==
Aylward was born and raised in Seattle, Washington. He attended St. Joseph's Grade school and went on to Prep High School, but graduated from Garfield High School in 1965. He graduated from the Professional Actor's Training Program at the University of Washington in 1970.

Beginning his acting career in Seattle, he was also one of the founders, in 1973, of Empty Space Theatre there. He worked regularly as a company member of the Seattle Repertory Theatre. He appeared in dramas by David Mamet, Arthur Miller and Tennessee Williams. Carol Flynt, co-producer of ER, first offered him an audition after seeing him in a 1996 production of Psychopathia Sexualis at the Mark Taper Forum in Los Angeles. He went on to play the recurring role of Dr. Donald Anspaugh on ER from 1996 to 2008. He also had a recurring role as former DNC chairman Barry Goodwin on The West Wing from 2005 to 2006. He also provided the voice of Dr. Arne Magnusson in the 2007 video game Half-Life 2: Episode Two.

Aylward appeared in numerous television shows, including Northern Exposure, 3rd Rock from the Sun, The Practice, Law & Order and Mad Men. His film roles included Three Fugitives (1989), Teenage Mutant Ninja Turtles III (1993), Buddy (1997), Armageddon (1998), Thirteen Days (2000), and the HBO films From the Earth to the Moon (1998) and Path to War (2002). He played Father Edward Devine in the 2020 sports drama movie The Way Back.

Aylward died in Seattle on May 16, 2022, at the age of 75.

== Filmography ==
=== Film ===
Year	Title	Role	Notes
1988	Seven Hours to Judgment	Taxi Driver	
1989	Three Fugitives	Second Cop	
1993	Teenage Mutant Ninja Turtles III	Niles	
1997	Buddy	Mr. Joe Bowman	
1998	Armageddon	Dr. Banks	
1998	Finding Graceland	Sheriff Haynes	
1999	Can't Stop Dancing	Dick McGuire	
1999	Instinct	Warden Keefer	
2000	Thirteen Days	Orvil Dryfoos	
2001	Just Visiting	Byron	
2002	Bad Company	Officer Ferren	
2003	Down with Love	E.G.	
2005	Monster-in-Law	Priest	Uncredited
2005	North Country	Judge Halsted	
2006	The Celestine Prophecy	Dobson	
2007	The Gray Man	Captain Ayers	
2009	Crimes of the Past	Clay Covington	
2010	The Crazies	Mayor Hobbs	
2010	Norman	Robert Bessent	
2011	Water for Elephants	Mr. Erwin	
2013	Gangster Squad	Judge Carter	
2014	A Million Ways to Die in the West	Pastor Wilson	
2020	The Nowhere Inn	Uncle Pete	
2020	The Way Back	Father Edward Devine	

=== Television ===
Year	Title	Role	Notes
1989	Third Degree Burn	Lomas	Television film
1990	Child in the Night	Dr. Wendt	Television film
1990-1992	Northern Exposure	Charles 'Red' Murphy	4 episodes
1996; 2000	3rd Rock from the Sun	Registrar / Chancellor	2 episodes
1996-2008	ER	Dr. Donald Anspaugh	Recurring role, 74 episodes
1996	Ink	Advertiser #1	1 episode
1997	Grace Under Fire	Ralph	1 episode
1997-2002	The Practice	Various	4 episodes
1998	From the Earth to the Moon	Dr. Ray Pemberton	Miniseries, 1 episode
1998	Creature	Ben Madiera	Miniseries, 2 episodes
1999	Swing Vote	Justice Benjamin 'Rip' Ripley	Television film
2000	The Others	Albert McGonagle	Main role, 9 episodes
2000	Secret Agent Man	Dr. Phil Etherington	1 episode
2000-2001	The Fugitive	Matthes Ross	Recurring role, 5 episodes
2000-2001	Family Law	Judge Lester Burger	Recurring role, 5 episodes
2001-2006	Alias	Jeffrey Davenport	3 episodes
2001	Diagnosis Murder	Captain Woodruff	1 episode
2002	Ally McBeal	Owen Cobb	1 episode
2002	Dharma & Greg	Kevin Kincaid	1 episode
2002	The X-Files	Dr. John Rietz	Episode: "Sunshine Days"
2002	Path to War	Dean Rusk	Television film
2002	Everwood	Walter Cunningham	1 episode
2002	The Agency	Senator Davies	1 episode
2003	Judging Amy	Father Jack Monroe	1 episode
2003	Good Morning, Miami	Mr. Fowler	1 episode
2004	Nip/Tuck	Father Malley	1 episode
2004	Jack & Bobby	Victor Sable	1 episode
2005	Carnivàle	Bishop MacNaughton	2 episodes
2005	Surface	Government Panel Suit	1 episode
2005	Law & Order	Reverend Harlan Dwyer	1 episode
2005-2006	The West Wing	Barry Goodwin	Recurring role, 6 episodes
2006	Boston Legal	Tom Orchard	1 episode
2006	Stargate SG-1	President Nadal	1 episode
2006	Cold Case	Norman Campbell	1 episode
2007	Without a Trace	Bernard Fields	1 episode
2007	Cavemen	Dorouchey	1 episode
2007	My Boys	Brent	1 episode
2007	Big Shots	Larry Cooper	1 episode
2008	The Mentalist	Professor Stutzer	1 episode
2009	CSI: Crime Scene Investigation	Dr. Paul Anton	1 episode
2010	Brothers & Sisters	Joe Rawling	3 episodes
2010	Mad Men	Geoffrey Atherton	2 episodes
2010	The Whole Truth	Judge Jeremiah Studley	2 episodes
2011	Harry's Law		1 episode
2012	Fringe	Dr. Owen Frank	Episode: "A Better Human Being"
2012	Fairly Legal	Sam Childs	1 episode
2012	House of Lies	K. Warren Dale	3 episodes
2012	American Horror Story	Father Malachi	Episode: "Tricks and Treats"
2013	Major Crimes	Ted King Sr.	1 episode
2015-2016	Impastor	Bishop Perkins	2 episodes
2016	Scorpion	Uncle Tobin	1 episode
2016	Shameless	Bill Darrgen	1 episode
2018	Nobodies	Curtis	Recurring role, 5 episodes
2018	Yellowstone	Father Bob	2 episodes
2019-2020	Briarpatch	Freddie Laffter	Recurring role, 5 episodes

=== Video games ===
Year	Title	Role	Notes
2007	Half-Life 2: Episode Two	Dr. Arne Magnusson	Voice only

== Stage ==
Year	Title	Role	Theatre
1993	The Kentucky Cycle	Various	Royale Theatre
2008	The Breach	Mac/Ensemble	Seattle Rep
2014	Outside Mullingar	Tony	Samuel J. Friedman Theatre
