= Brand X (The X-Files) =

- The X-Files episode
- Episode no.: Season 7 Episode 18
- Directed by: Kim Manners
- Written by: Steven Maeda; Greg Walker
- Production code: 7ABX19
- Original air date: April 16, 2000
- Running time: 44 minutes

Guest appearances
- Mitch Pileggi as Walter Skinner; Dennis Boutsikaris as Dr. Peter Voss; Richard Cox as Daniel Brimley; Tobin Bell as Darryl Weaver; Mike Hungerford as Complaining Man; Shannon O'Hurley as Ann Voss; Arthur Rosenberg as Lead Counsel; Ron Marasco as Doctor; Pat Destro as Joan Scobie; Caryn West as Dr. Libby Nance; Rick Deats as Dr. Jim Scobie; David Sawyer as Security Man; Greg Poland as Second Windbreaker Man; Matthew T. Wilson as Manager

Episode chronology
← Previous "all things"	Next → "Hollywood A.D."
- The X-Files season 7

"Brand X" is the eighteenth episode of the seventh season of the science fiction television series The X-Files. It premiered on the Fox network in the United States on April 16, 2000. It was written by Steven Maeda and Greg Walker and directed by Kim Manners. The episode is a "Monster-of-the-Week" story, unconnected to the series' wider mythology. "Brand X" earned a Nielsen household rating of 6.8, being watched by 10.81 million people in its initial broadcast. The episode received mixed reviews from critics.

The show centers on FBI special agents Fox Mulder (David Duchovny) and Dana Scully (Gillian Anderson) who work on cases linked to the paranormal, called X-Files. Mulder is a believer in the paranormal, while the skeptical Scully has been assigned to debunk his work. In this episode, Walter Skinner (Mitch Pileggi) is horrified when the witness who was due to testify against the Morley cigarette company dies mysteriously. After being called in to assist, Mulder and Scully soon discover that a new brand of cigarette has a dangerous secret.

Inspired by the 1999 film The Insider, "Brand X" was written by Maeda and Walker to be an exploration of the corporate evil inside the cigarette industry. The scenes featuring shots of beetles crawling out of corpses were shot and filmed using real insects as well as real actors. In one particular scene, over 3,000 live insects were used. Those scenes took up to a full day to film.

== Plot ==
In Winston-Salem, North Carolina, Walter Skinner (Mitch Pileggi) is charged with guarding the life of Dr. James Scobie, a former researcher who is testifying against his former employer, the Morley tobacco corporation. Prior to his trial, Scobie develops a cough, but shrugs it off. In the morning, Skinner and Scobie's wife find his body on the bathroom floor, with his face ripped away.

Morley has created a form of "super-tobacco", which is inhabited by a genetically engineered tobacco beetle whose eggs can survive the process of cigarette manufacturing and are released in the smoke of the cigarettes. The cigarettes were tested on a range of subjects by Scobie and his colleague, Dr. Peter Voss. Of the four human test subjects, chain smoker Darryl Weaver is the only surviving participant. Prior to his death, Scobie agreed to give Weaver an unlimited supply of cigarettes in exchange for his silence; he subsequently pressures Voss into honoring his "arrangement" with Scobie.

A chain of victims soon succumb to the eggs contained in the toxic smoke, all of whom are found with their bodies covered in the tobacco beetles. While interviewing Weaver, Fox Mulder (David Duchovny) is exposed to the smoke, later coughing up blood and needing his lungs invasively cleared as the beetles begin to hatch.

Voss, who had until now been hiding behind his legal advisor, has a change of heart upon hearing of Mulder's condition and tells Skinner of the aforementioned testing. Skinner goes to Weaver's apartment after getting his name from Voss and finds Morley's director of security bound and gagged. When Skinner removes the gag, the man chokes and beetles begin crawling from his mouth. At the hospital, Mulder is in grave danger due to the eggs now hatching in his lungs, and Dana Scully (Gillian Anderson) attempts to find a way to save him, because he is now "too weak for thoracic surgery."

Meanwhile, Weaver attempts to browbeat Skinner, threatening to light one of the toxic cigarettes. As Weaver attempts to leave the building, Skinner shoots his shoulder and the pane of glass behind him, leaving him injured and covered in glass. He drops his cigarette to the floor and Skinner snuffs it out with his shoe. Back at the hospital, Scully realizes that nicotine might save Mulder's life. She is correct in her solution, noting that the high level of nicotine in Weaver's system didn't allow the beetles to develop. Scully administers nicotine to Mulder, who in turn recovers, albeit with a sore throat, as well as a minor addiction to nicotine, which drives him to buy a pack of Morley cigarettes for himself. Chided by Scully, he throws them out, but then stares at them pensively after she leaves.

== Production ==
=== Writing ===
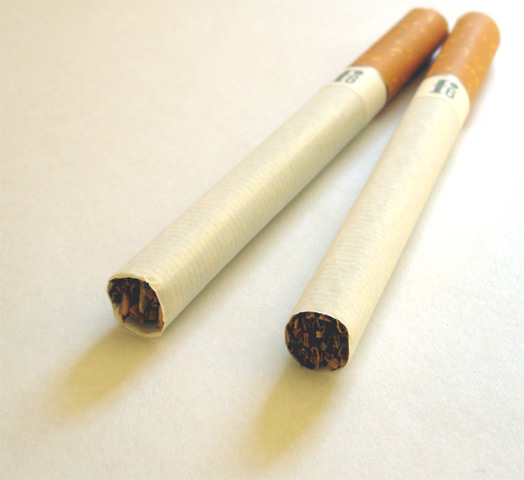
The episode deals with the theme of the "corporate evil that populates the cigarette industry".

"Brand X" began as a script that explored "the horrifying aspects of over-eating". However, since an earlier season seven episode, "Hungry", had dealt with similar themes, the writing staff decided to take the story in a different direction and examine the "corporate evil that populates the cigarette industry". The episode's writers, Steven Maeda and Greg Walker, were both admitted fans of The Insider (1999), a film that examines the tobacco industry, and so the two decided to craft an episode with a similar feel. Marc Shapiro, in his book All Things: The Official Guide to the X-Files Volume 6, notes that the episode's theme was "literally, torn from the headlines"—a rare occurrence for an X-Files episode.

Because both David Duchovny and Gillian Anderson were busy finalizing their own episodes ("Hollywood A.D." and "All Things", respectively), the writers struggled with a way to create a convincing story that did not require Mulder and Scully to be in every scene. The two eventually decided that causing Mulder to get sick in acts three and four would free up Duchovny for his episode. Walker noted, "Mulder getting sick in Act Two and being in a hospital bed for Acts Three and Four was the direct result of his limited amount of time. It was easier to shoot a bunch of stuff of him in bed than having him have to be in a lot of different locations."

=== Filming ===
To match the episode's smoking theme, production designer Corey Kaplan created an overall yellow and brown color scheme for the episode. In this manner, each scene was given "a perpetually smoky look". Kaplan, who worked closely with episode director Kim Manners, had the idea to "enhance" Morley Cigarette's corporate offices with "long hallways and sets heavy on texture and grit" in order to complement the aforementioned palette choice.

The scenes of beetles crawling out of corpses were shot and filmed using real insects as well as real actors. During one scene in which a victim's body is discovered, over 3,000 live beetles were shot crawling on the body of Mike Hungerford, the portraying actor. Producer Harry Bring later claimed that the bug scenes were tedious and hard to film because "bugs don't take directions very well, so you pretty much have to wait until they decided to get it right." Although the shots of the bugs were considerably brief in the final episode, the scenes required a full day of shooting to get perfect. The sequences of bugs crawling out of Daniel Brimley's mouth and the shots of the bugs being sucked out of Mulder were created by combining CGI imagery with "dummy bugs".

== Reception ==
"Brand X" first aired in the United States on April 16, 2000. This episode earned a Nielsen rating of 6.8, with a 10 share, meaning that roughly 6.8 percent of all television-equipped households, and 10 percent of households watching television, were tuned in to the episode. It was viewed by 10.81 million viewers. The episode aired in the United Kingdom and Ireland on Sky1 on July 16, 2000, and received 0.75 million viewers, making it the most watched episode that week.

Tom Kessenich, in his book Examinations, gave the episode a moderately positive review. He wrote that "this wasn't the most riveting X-File I've ever seen and there wasn't a tremendous amount of heart-pounding tension from beginning to end [...] but that didn't bother me. Sometimes, just being entertained is enough." Paula Vitaris from Cinefantastique gave the episode a moderately positive review and awarded it two-and-a-half stars out of four. Vitaris concluded that the episode was "not the series' most exciting episode, but a solid story with interesting characters used well in the service of the plot" Kenneth Silber from Space.com wrote positively of the episode, saying "'Brand X' benefits from a certain unpredictability in its plot and characters. The menace is unusual, and imaginatively conceived. The tobacco company and its employees display a degree of complexity, rather than merely serving as one-dimensional villains in a public-health morality play." Gareth Wigmore of TV Zone gave the episode an 8 out of 10 rating. Wigmore noted that a "freshness surrounds the whole episode, presumably a result of the writing".

Emily St. James of The A.V. Club awarded the episode a "C". She called it a "hodge-podge of various elements that have worked in the past but feel beyond tired now". She was largely critical of the episode's story, which she felt was a rip-off of The Insider, as well as the make-up effects for the episode, which she called "fairly fake" looking. St. James, however, was complimentary towards Tobin Bell's performance, calling him "charismatic and interesting". Rich Rosell from DigitallyObsessed.com awarded the episode 3 out of 5 stars and wrote "Tobacco beetles, dismembered noses and some really bad second-hand smoke permeate this installment, but it gets snuffed out with a lazy payoff." Robert Shearman, in his book Wanting to Believe: A Critical Guide to The X-Files, Millennium & The Lone Gunmen, rated the episode two-and-a-half stars out of five. Despite praising the plot, writing "it's a great premise, with lots of gore and larvae", Shearman lamented its loss in direction: "halfway through, once the episode reveals what its concept is, the story is left with nowhere to go."

== Bibliography ==
- Kessenich, Tom (2002). Examination: An Unauthorized Look at Seasons 6–9 of the X-Files. Trafford Publishing. ISBN 1-55369-812-6.
- Shapiro, Marc (2000). All Things: The Official Guide to the X-Files Volume 6. Harper Prism. ISBN 0-06-107611-2.
- Shearman, Robert (2009). Wanting to Believe: A Critical Guide to The X-Files, Millennium & The Lone Gunmen. Mad Norwegian Press. ISBN 978-0-9759446-9-1.
