= The X-Files season 7 =

Season of television series

The X-Files
- Season 7
- DVD cover
- Starring: David Duchovny; Gillian Anderson
- No. of episodes: 22

Release
- Original network: Fox
- Original release: November 7, 1999 – May 21, 2000

Season chronology
- ← Previous; Season 6 Next → Season 8

The seventh season of the American science fiction television series The X-Files commenced airing on the Fox network in the United States on November 7, 1999, concluded on May 21, 2000, and consists of twenty-two episodes. This season marks the end of various story lines; during this season, Fox Mulder (David Duchovny) learned the true fate of his sister, Samantha.

Before the broadcasting for the season began, Duchovny sued Fox and eventually announced his decision to leave the show. As a result, the season would be the last to feature Duchovny in a full-time capacity until the show's tenth season (which aired in 2016), although he would return in seasons 8 and 9 as an intermittent main character. Due to this eventual character change, this season would be the last to feature the original opening sequence for the series, as the intro was updated for the eighth season in an attempt to renew and revive the series.

The seventh-season premiere "The Sixth Extinction", debuted with a Nielsen rating of 10.6 and was viewed by 17.82 million viewers, marking a noticeable drop in viewership since the sixth season. The series fell from number 12 to number 29 for the 1999–2000 television year. Critically, the show's seventh season received mixed to positive reviews; many reviewers felt that the show still produced good episodes, but that it was the weakest of the Duchovny and Anderson seasons of the show.

== Plot overview ==
After the events of the season six finale, Walter Skinner (Mitch Pileggi) and Michael Kritschgau (John Finn) are desperately attempting to find the truth behind the so-called alien object. Meanwhile, Fox Mulder (David Duchovny) is still imprisoned by his own frenetic brain activity. Dana Scully (Gillian Anderson) and Skinner are unaware of FBI Special Agent Diana Fowley's (Mimi Rogers) duplicity—she is working for Cigarette Smoking Man (William B. Davis). Scully then travels to Africa to unravel the secrets of the alien artifacts, finding something that looks like a spaceship buried under the shoreline off the Côte d'Ivoire coast. The object may prove that life originated elsewhere, and all religion is based on the Navajo contact with alien life. Unsuccessful, Scully returns from Africa to revisit Mulder in Washington, D.C., but instead she finds out that he has disappeared. She contacts Kritschgau and Skinner to find her partner. Cigarette Smoking Man has taken Mulder to a place where all his problems seem to have disappeared. Fowley helps Scully locate Mulder, which leads to her death at the hands of Cigarette Smoking Man.

While investigating a bizarre disappearance of a young girl from her home, Mulder becomes obsessed with the number of children who have vanished in similar circumstances. Scully fears that he is emotionally involved due to his sister's disappearance. At the same time it is revealed to him that his mother, Teena Mulder (Rebecca Toolan), committed suicide. He then tries to prove that his mother did not take her own life, but is ultimately forced to accept that his mother's death was by her own hand. He is led by a man whose son disappeared years earlier to another truth—that his sister may be among the souls taken by "walk-ins", saving the souls of children doomed to live unhappy lives. Together they locate evidence that proves that Samantha was abducted by Cigarette Smoking Man and was forced to live in a now-abandoned US Army base. It is later revealed that Samantha had become a "walk-in" spirit.

Mulder and Scully investigate a case which leads them back to Oregon, the site of their first case together. With a series of Alien abductions taking place, Mulder and Scully are contacted by Billy Miles (Zachary Ansley). Scully falls ill during the investigation and returns to Washington, D.C. Cigarette Smoking Man contacts Marita Covarrubias (Laurie Holden) and Alex Krycek (Nicholas Lea), in an attempt to revive the government conspiracy. With Covarrubias unwilling to assist, and Krycek seeking revenge, they contact Mulder after he visits an alien crash site. Skinner and Mulder return to Oregon, while Scully is hospitalized in Washington, D.C. Mulder becomes trapped by an alien device, and is abducted by an Alien Bounty Hunter (Brian Thompson) together with Miles and several others. Skinner returns to Washington, D.C., where Scully informs him that she is pregnant, though she does not tell him that Mulder is the father.

== Production ==
=== Background ===
After five seasons in Vancouver, British Columbia, Canada, production of The X-Files moved to Los Angeles. The X-Files' sixth season was the first season of the show to be filmed in the new location. The move was instigated by Duchovny in order to facilitate his work in films as well as to give him a chance to be nearer to his wife, Téa Leoni. Series creator Chris Carter opposed the move, but Fox network officials eventually made the decision to film in California. Although the move was unpopular with some members of the cast and crew, both series director Kim Manners and Anderson supported the move, although less vocally than Duchovny. Many fans accused the show of "Hollywood-izing" by adding notable guests stars as well as making the plots simpler and more enjoyable for mass audiences. Furthermore, the move to Los Angeles also meant a drastic increase in production costs.

=== Development ===
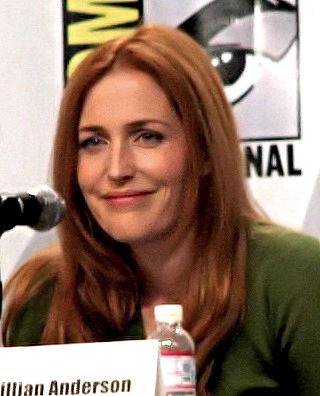
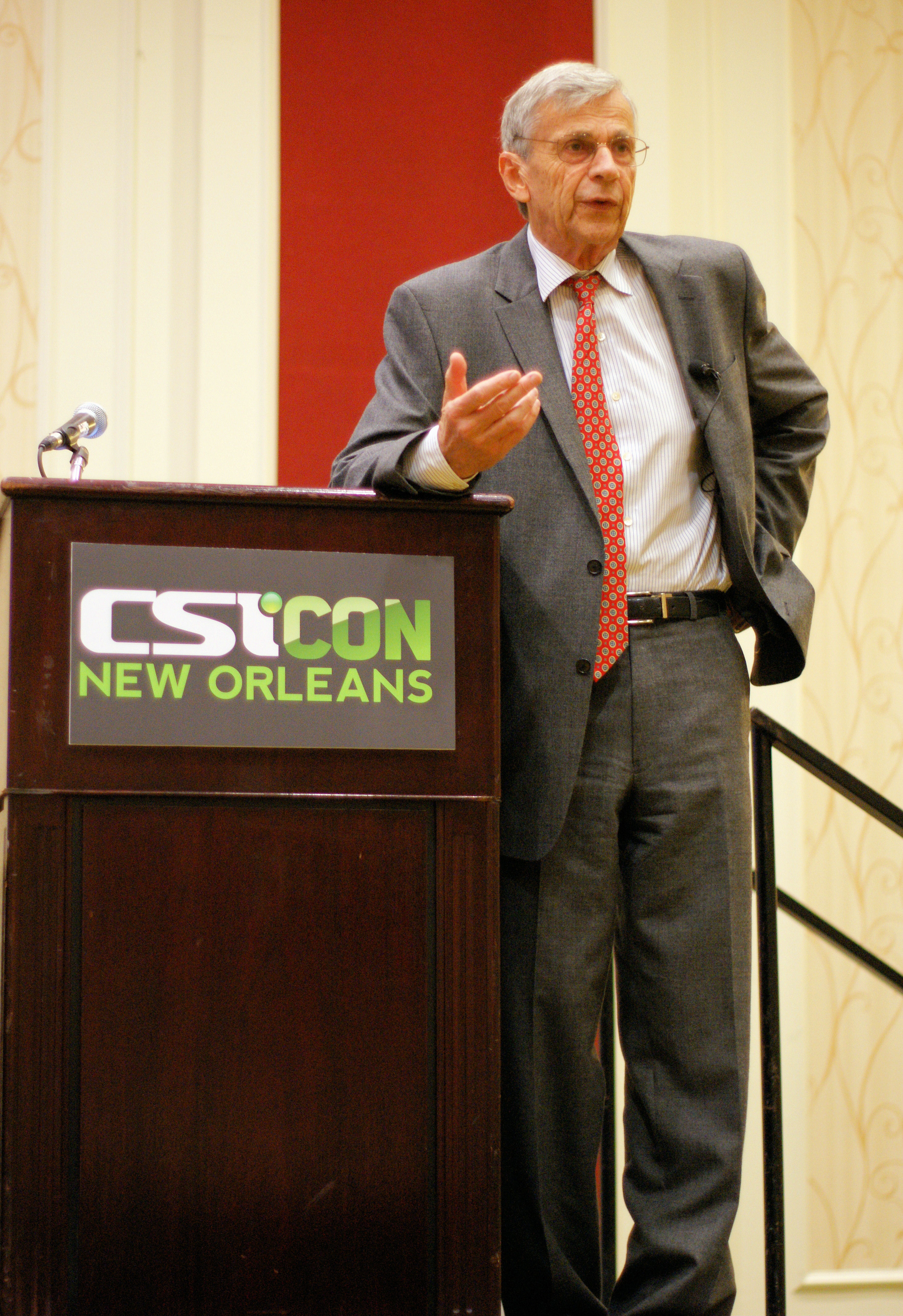
Gillian Anderson (left) and William B. Davis (right) wrote their first—and only—episodes of The X-Files during the seventh season.

Originally, the mythology for season seven was supposed to continue from and show the ramifications of the "Two Fathers"/"One Son" story arc. Frank Spotnitz, in an interview, explained that the mythology episodes for season seven would feature "characters you saw in 'One Son' coming back" and explore "what happens now that the conspiracy has been destroyed, what are the politics of the new landscape that exists. […] There are aliens from outer space, two different races that are warring with each other." In addition, he said that the then-planned series finale would feature "the big idea that Chris [Carter] had in the beginning." However, these ideas never came to pass, and the season finale, "Requiem", segued directly into the eighth season premiere "Within". Duchovny later revealed that, had the show ended, the final three episodes would have been devoted to the myth-arc.

While filming was underway for the seventh season, many members of the crew felt that the show had entered into its final season. Executive producer Frank Spotnitz later explained, "There was a pretty strong sentiment inside and outside the show that it was time to call it a day." Because the show's producers felt that the show was nearing its end, many story arcs were ended in the season. The fourth episode, "Millennium" was written as a way to bring closure to the recently cancelled Carter-created series of the same name. The episode features Lance Henriksen reprising his role as Frank for the last time. The eleventh episode, "Closure", features Mulder discovering what happened to his sister. The idea to close the story arc received mixed reactions from various production and crew members. However, many of the show's producers realized that the time had come to answer one of the show's biggest questions. Paul Rabwin noted that, "It's been seven years. I don't think any of us are going to miss Samantha Mulder. That device and motivation were very strong in the early years of the show. But as the years have gone by, the speculation kind of melted away." As the season progressed, however, the idea of producing another season emerged. Paul Rabwin explained that, "we found ourselves starting to get energized again. [...] As we got toward the end of the season, everyone was kind of hopeful."

The season also saw several of the show's cast write their own episodes. Series co-star Gillian Anderson directed and wrote her first episode of the series, "all things". Anderson originally approached Carter about writing and directing an episode of the series during the sixth season. Anderson crafted a script that would see Scully pursuing a "deeply personal X-File, one which in [she] is taken down a spiritual path when logic fails her". Anderson had only a rough outline of the script until one day she wrote a majority of the story in one sitting. She explained, "A certain concept began to form, [and] I just wrote the entire outline for 'all things' right then and there. It all just kind of came together on the page". The next day, Anderson pitched the script to Carter, who approved of the "personal and quiet" characteristics of the story. In addition, series regular Davis wrote his only episode, "En Ami". Davis approached Carter with his idea about Cigarette Smoking Man trying to seduce Scully with medical knowledge, and Carter, who was intrigued, responded positively to the idea. He assigned executive producer Spotnitz to work with Davis and craft a full-fledged script. The script went through many revisions. Because Cigarette Smoking Man was able to manipulate Scully, Carter later referred to the "En Ami" as "the creepiest episode of the year."

=== Lawsuit ===
Before the season aired, David Duchovny filed a lawsuit against 20th Century Fox. Duchovny claimed that Fox had undersold the rights to its own affiliates, thereby costing him huge sums of money. Originally, in the contract, Duchovny was eligible for an estimated five percent, but, according to him, he "had seen only a fraction" of the money. Eventually, the lawsuit was settled, and Duchovny was awarded a settlement of about $20 million. The lawsuit put strain on Duchovny's professional relationships. Although his lawsuit never called Chris Carter a defendant, their friendship was notably impacted. One anonymous source noted that "the whole lawsuit thing revealed that Carter knew (Duchovny) was getting screwed and didn't warn him. Carter proved where his loyalties lay with his actions."

Neither Carter nor Duchovny were contracted to work on the series beyond the seventh season; however, Fox entered into negotiations near the end of season in order to bring the two on board for an eighth season. After the airing of "Requiem", Duchovny expressed his intentions to leave the series. He explained, "I was kind of a free agent after season seven, and to me, there was not much else to do in terms of the character. So it was really about me wanting to pursue other parts of my career as a writer, director, and actor." Rumors began spreading—and were eventually confirmed—that, since Duchovny had not expressed an interest to appear as a main character in the eighth season, that another character would take Mulder's place. Many fans on the internet believed that Mitch Pileggi, who portrayed Walter Skinner, would take the role; Pileggi later called this guess "ridiculous."

=== Crew ===
Series creator Chris Carter also served as executive producer and showrunner and wrote six episodes. Spotnitz continued as executive producer and wrote five episodes. Vince Gilligan continued as co-executive producer and wrote six episodes. John Shiban was promoted to supervising producer and wrote two episodes. David Amann was promoted to co-producer and wrote two episodes. Jeffrey Bell was promoted to story editor and wrote two episodes. Cyberpunk novelists William Gibson and Tom Maddox returned to write their second of two episodes for the series. Cast member Duchovny wrote two episodes in the season, while other cast members Anderson and Davis also wrote an episode each. New writers in the seventh season included Steven Maeda and Greg Walker, who wrote one episode; and Chip Johannessen who wrote a single freelance episode. Other producers included Paul Rabwin, Harry V. Bring and Bernadette Caulfield, and Michelle MacLaren who joined as co-executive producer.

Producing-directors for the show included producer Rob Bowman, supervising producer Manners, and co-executive producer Michael Watkins, who directed the bulk of the episodes for the season. Bowman directed two episodes for his final season on the series, Manners directed seven, and Watkins directed three. Cast members David Duchovny and Gillian Anderson each directed one episode. Series creator Chris Carter directed a single episode, while series writer Vince Gilligan made his television directorial debut. Other directors for the season included Thomas J. Wright who directed three episodes, with Robert Lieberman, Cliff Bole, and Paul Shapiro each directing one.

== Cast ==
=== Main cast ===
==== Starring ====
- David Duchovny as Special Agent Fox Mulder
- Gillian Anderson as Special Agent Dana Scully

==== Also starring ====
- Mitch Pileggi as Walter Skinner
- William B. Davis as Cigarette Smoking Man
- Nicholas Lea as Alex Krycek

=== Recurring cast ===
- Tom Braidwood as Melvin Frohike
- Bruce Harwood as John Fitzgerald Byers
- Dean Haglund as Richard Langly
- Rebecca Toolan as Teena Mulder

=== Guest cast ===
- John Finn as Michael Kritschgau
- Mimi Rogers as Diana Fowley
- Nick Chinlund as Donnie Pfaster
- Jerry Hardin as Deep Throat
- Laurie Holden as Marita Covarrubias
- Roy Thinnes as Jeremiah Smith
- Brian Thompson as Alien Bounty Hunter
- Floyd Westerman as Albert Hosteen

== Episodes ==
Episodes marked with a double dagger (‡) are episodes in the series' Alien Mythology arc. (Note: The episodes were included in the DVD collection The X-Files Mythology, Volume 3 – Colonization, released by Fox.)

No. overall	No. in season	Title	Directed by	Written by	Original release date	Prod. code	U.S. viewers (millions)
140	1	"The Sixth Extinction"‡	Kim Manners	Chris Carter	November 7, 1999	7ABX03	17.82
Walter Skinner and Michael Kritschgau work desperately to attempt to discover what is wrong with Fox Mulder, who is imprisoned by his own frenetic brain activity, but they are unaware of Agent Diana Fowley's duplicity. In the meanwhile, Dana Scully is hunting for an ancient artifact in Africa.
141	2	"The Sixth Extinction II: Amor Fati"‡	Michael Watkins	David Duchovny & Chris Carter	November 14, 1999	7ABX04	16.15
Returning to Washington to find Mulder gone, Scully joins Kritschgau and Skinner—who is still being forced into betrayal by Alex Krycek—to find her partner. However, the Cigarette Smoking Man has taken Mulder to a place where all his problems are gone and Fowley is forced to make a choice about her loyalties.
142	3	"Hungry"	Kim Manners	Vince Gilligan	November 21, 1999	7ABX01	16.17
In an episode told from the point-of-view of the "monster", a fast-food employee with unusual cravings becomes the focus of an FBI investigation. The victims appear with no brain and a suction hole in the forehead.
143	4	"Millennium"	Thomas J. Wright	Vince Gilligan & Frank Spotnitz	November 28, 1999	7ABX05	15.09
An associate of the Millennium Group, which believes the apocalypse will happen on the new year of 2000, resurrects the dead for use in the bringing about of the apocalypse, and Mulder and Scully have to ask the help of criminal profiler Frank Black, a man who has former experience with the shadowy group.
144	5	"Rush"	Robert Lieberman	David Amann	December 5, 1999	7ABX06	12.71
When a school student becomes the prime suspect in the bizarre murder of a police officer, Mulder and Scully are sent to investigate. They discover that the boy and a couple of friends have been playing with the ability to accelerate their movements to a frequency the human eye can't perceive.
145	6	"The Goldberg Variation"	Thomas J. Wright	Jeffrey Bell	December 12, 1999	7ABX02	14.49
After being thrown off a building and surviving, Henry Weems, who appears to be the luckiest man in the world, attracts the attention of Mulder and Scully. But, if he is so lucky, why is he on the run from the mob, and why is everyone around him so unlucky?
146	7	"Orison"	Rob Bowman	Chip Johannessen	January 9, 2000	7ABX07	15.63
Reverend Orison releases Donnie Pfaster, Scully's former kidnapper, as seen in the second season episode "Irresistible", from jail in the hopes of passing judgment on him. What he discovers instead is that he has released pure evil, and it's headed for Scully.
147	8	"The Amazing Maleeni"	Thomas J. Wright	Vince Gilligan & John Shiban & Frank Spotnitz	January 16, 2000	7ABX08	16.18
The Amazing Maleeni, a small-time magician, performs an amazing feat to impress a heckler—he turns his head 360 degrees. So when he is later found without a head at all, Mulder and Scully arrive on the case and discover an angry ex-con, an unimpressed rival, and Maleeni's twin brother all seem to have something to do with the plan to rob a major bank.
148	9	"Signs and Wonders"	Kim Manners	Jeffrey Bell	January 23, 2000	7ABX09	13.86
When a small town church is the site of a number of ritualistic-like murders, fingers are pointed to the Church of God with Signs and Wonders, a church where the Bible is read literally, and punishment is dealt deftly. But soon the agents realize that the difference between the peaceful religious and the fanatics may not be very much at all.
149	10	"Sein und Zeit"‡	Michael Watkins	Chris Carter & Frank Spotnitz	February 6, 2000	7ABX10	13.95
While investigating the bizarre disappearance of a young girl from her home, Mulder becomes obsessed with a number of children who have vanished in similar ways. Scully's fears that he is emotionally involved due to his sister's disappearance 27 years earlier are heightened when Mulder's mother dies, apparently of suicide.
150	11	"Closure"‡	Kim Manners	Chris Carter & Frank Spotnitz	February 13, 2000	7ABX11	15.35
As Mulder is forced to accept that his mother's death was by her own hand, he is led by a man whose son disappeared years earlier to another truth—that his sister may be among the souls taken by 'walk-ins', saving the souls of children doomed to live unhappy lives. Together, they embark on a journey that will reveal to Mulder the truth about his sister's disappearance.
151	12	"X-Cops"	Michael Watkins	Vince Gilligan	February 20, 2000	7ABX12	16.56
A filming of an episode of COPS gets in the way of the collaborative effort between the FBI and the local police department. Mulder later finds out that the monster feeds on fear. While Mulder embraces the publicity, Scully is not so sure of it. The episode was filmed as if it were an authentic episode of the TV series COPS.
152	13	"First Person Shooter"	Chris Carter	William Gibson & Tom Maddox	February 27, 2000	7ABX13	15.31
The Lone Gunmen summon Mulder and Scully to the headquarters of a video game design company when the new virtual-reality game, which the Gunmen helped design, is taken over by a bizarre female computer character whose power is much more than virtual.
153	14	"Theef"	Kim Manners	Vince Gilligan & John Shiban & Frank Spotnitz	March 12, 2000	7ABX14	11.91
After a prominent doctor discovers his father-in-law dead and the word "Theef" written on the wall in blood, Mulder suspects hexcraft may be the source of threats against the doctor's family.
154	15	"En Ami"‡	Rob Bowman	William B. Davis	March 19, 2000	7ABX15	11.99
After a young boy with cancer, whose parents do not believe in medical treatment because it is against God's will, recovers miraculously, Scully is intrigued. What she soon discovers is that his cure is not miraculous, but scientific. Eager, if wary, to learn of the truth behind his secrets, Scully agrees to travel with the Cigarette Smoking Man to get the cure to all mankind's diseases.
155	16	"Chimera"	Cliff Bole	David Amann	April 2, 2000	7ABX16	12.89
Mulder investigates what appears to be a case of a missing woman from a small town, but soon turns out to be a murder by a spirit summoned from the underworld. Scully, meanwhile, must endure an uncomfortable stakeout.
156	17	"all things"	Gillian Anderson	Gillian Anderson	April 9, 2000	7ABX17	12.18
While Mulder is away in England, Scully is led by coincidences, chance, fate and possibly a higher power to a married man with whom she had an affair during medical school, and a look at the life she didn't choose, forcing her to make choices about her future.
157	18	"Brand X"	Kim Manners	Steven Maeda & Greg Walker	April 16, 2000	7ABX19	10.81
While protecting a man due to testify against the Morley cigarette company, Skinner is horrified when the witness dies mysteriously. What the agents soon discover is that a new brand of cigarette has a dangerous secret.
158	19	"Hollywood A.D."	David Duchovny	David Duchovny	April 30, 2000	7ABX18	12.88
Wayne Federman, an entrepreneurial Hollywood producer and college friend of Skinner, picks up the idea for a film based on the X-Files division, however the agents find that the level of realism in their fictional portrayal is somewhat questionable.
159	20	"Fight Club"	Paul Shapiro	Chris Carter	May 7, 2000	7ABX20	11.70
Mulder and Scully cross paths with a pair of doppelgangers whose close proximity yields unlimited mayhem. Splitting up in two, the agents try to find out "why" and "what" they are doing.
160	21	"Je Souhaite"	Vince Gilligan	Vince Gilligan	May 14, 2000	7ABX21	12.79
Mulder and Scully's encounter with a man and his handicapped brother lead them to an indifferent genie whose willingness to grant wishes belies a deeper motive.
161	22	"Requiem"‡	Kim Manners	Chris Carter	May 21, 2000	7ABX22	15.26
Mulder and Scully return to the site of their first investigation together when a series of abductions take place. However, Scully's failing health, and Mulder's concern that she is in danger, cause him to take her off the case. Meanwhile, the Cigarette-Smoking Man—on his deathbed—reunites with Marita Covarrubias and Krycek in an attempt to revive the project.

== Reception ==
=== Ratings ===
The seventh season of The X-Files debuted with "The Sixth Extinction" on November 7, 1999. This episode earned a Nielsen rating of 10.6, with a 16 share, meaning that roughly 10.6 percent of all television-equipped households, and 16 percent of households watching television, were tuned into the episode. The episode was viewed by 17.82 million people, an increase from the sixth season's finale, "Biogenesis", which was viewed by 15.86 million viewers. However, the debut marked a decrease from the sixth season debut, "The Beginning", which garnered 20.34 million viewers. As the season continued, however, ratings began to drop. The season hit a low with the eighteenth episode, "Brand X", which was viewed by 10.81 million viewers. The season finale, "Requiem", earned a Nielsen rating of 8.9, with a 14 share, and was viewed by 15.26 million viewers, marking a 14 percent drop in viewers when compared to the season premiere, (Note: "Requiem" was viewed by 15.26 million viewers whereas "The Sixth Extinction" was viewed by 17.82 million viewers. Subtracting the two figures and then dividing them by 17.82 million, which represents the largest possible audience, yields a percent decrease of 14 percent.) and a 4 percent drop in viewers when compared to the previous season finale. (Note: "Requem" was viewed by 15.26 million viewers whereas "Biogenesis" was viewed by 15.86. Subtracting the two figures and then dividing them by 15.86 million, which represents the largest possible audience, yields a percent decrease of 4 percent.) The series was ranked at number 29 during the 1999–2000 television season, finishing with an average of 14.2 million viewers.

During 2000, companies were paying Fox $225,000 for every 30-second spot that would air between acts of The X-Files. Many Information technology (IT) companies were buying commercials during the show, largely due to the fact that "many ['coders IT geeks'] get their weekly fix of science fiction from this prime-time show."

=== Reviews ===
The seventh season received moderately positive reviews from critics, although increasingly critical reviews were more common this season. While critics enjoyed many of the episodes, many also felt that, as a whole, the season was the weakest of the show's original seven. Eric Mink of the New York Daily News praised the season, noting that it was "proof that The X-Files still has more than enough creative life in it to justify an eighth season". He called many of the stand-alone episodes "wonderfully creepy" and noted that the season possessed a "terrific bunch of episodes". Thomas Doherty from Cinefantastique gave the season a mixed review and noted that the series was hurt by the partnership between Mulder and Scully "settl[ing] into the comfortable groove of a modern two career marriage—supportive, professionally rewarding, and utterly sexless." Further, he noted that "the most entertaining episode lately have been the self parodies, where killer cockroaches scurry and living dead roam, or where (in the Duchovny written and directed episode) Scully and Mulder are played by Téa Leoni and Garry Shandling in a motion picture only slightly more ludicrous than a 1998 motion picture called The X-Files." Doherty argued that the "self-parody" style of the series caused viewers to not take it seriously anymore, explaining that, "No longer going for the big chill, Carter and company are winking at their audience, as if to say: even we can't pretend to believe in this muddled mishmash anymore." Tom Kessenich, in his book Examination: An Unauthorized Look at Seasons 6–9 of the X-Files, was positive towards the first half of the season, but soon saw the episodes in more of a negative light. He wrote, "A season that began with such hope ended with a sense of sorrow given the end result of the season-long backstage wheeling and dealing [a reference to David Duchovny's lawsuit]. Not even the magnificent season finale […] could erase the nagging doubts I had that a series that had been so amazing for so long would soon embark upon a new course wrought with pitfalls and turmoil." The A.V. Club noted that while the first eight seasons of The X-Files were "good-to-great", the seventh season of the show was "flagging" and possessed "significant problems.

The episodes themselves received a variety of reviews. Some were positively received: several reviews praised the episode "X-Cops", the show's highly promoted cross-over with the police reality show COPS. One review from the New York Daily News called the outing "exceptionally clever" whereas Starpulse named the episode the funniest of the series. The Duchovny-penned "Hollywood A.D." was praised for its self-reflexive comedy by several reviews. Other episodes were more harshly received. Anderson's writing debut, "all things" was critiqued for being "dull" and "heavy-handed". "Brand X", on the other hand, was called "a waste of an episode."

=== Accolades ===
The seventh season earned the series six Primetime Emmy Award nominations, with three wins. The episode "First Person Shooter" won for Outstanding Sound Mixing for a Drama Series and Outstanding Special Visual Effects for a Series. The episode "Theef" won for Outstanding Makeup for a Series. Other nominations included Mark Snow for Outstanding Music Composition for a Series (Dramatic Underscore) for "Theef", the episode "First Person Shooter" for Outstanding Sound Editing for a Series, and "Rush" for Outstanding Special Visual Effects for a Series. The series, as well as Gillian Anderson, won a Teen.com Entertainment Award for Best Drama Series and Best Actress in a Series, respectively. Other nominations included two Screen Actors Guild Award nominations for David Duchovny and Gillian Anderson, an Environmental Media Awards nomination for "Brand X", and an International Monitor Award nomination for "Rush".

== DVD release ==
The X-Files – The Complete Seventh Season
Set details		Special features
22 episodes; 7-disc set; 1.78:1 aspect ratio; Subtitles: English, Spanish; English (Dolby 2.0 Surround)		"The Truth About Season Seven" Documentary; Audio Commentaries (Dolby Digital 2.0 Stereo); "First Person Shooter" – Chris Carter; "all things" – Gillian Anderson; "Je Souhaite" – Vince Gilligan; 13 special effects clips; 10 deleted scenes; Character profiles; 22 promotional television spots; DVD-ROM game
Release dates
Region 1	Region 2	Region 4
May 13, 2003	September 22, 2003	October 20, 2003

== Bibliography ==
- Hurwitz, Matt; Knowles, Chris (2008). The Complete X-Files. Insight Editions. ISBN 978-1-933784-80-9.
- Kessenich, Tom (2002). Examination. New York, US: Trafford Publishing. ISBN 1-55369-812-6.
- Meisler, Andy (2000). The End and the Beginning: The Official Guide to the X-Files Season 6. HarperCollins. ISBN 0-06-107595-7.
- Shapiro, Marc (2000). All Things: The Official Guide to the X-Files Volume 6. Harper Prism. ISBN 0-06-107611-2.
- Shearman, Robert; Pearson, Lars (2009). Wanting to Believe: A Critical Guide to The X-Files, Millennium & The Lone Gunmen. Mad Norwegian Press. ISBN 978-0-9759446-9-1.
