= Fight Club (The X-Files) =

- The X-Files episode
- Two FBI agents who look like Mulder and Scully visit Betty Templeton. The two agents were played by Steve Kiziak (David Duchovny's stunt double) and Arlene Pileggi (Gillian Anderson's stand-in), respectively.
- Episode no.: Season 7 Episode 20
- Directed by: Paul Shapiro
- Written by: Chris Carter
- Production code: 7ABX20
- Original air date: May 7, 2000
- Running time: 44 minutes

Guest appearances
- Kathy Griffin as Betty Templeton/Lulu Pfeiffer; Randall "Tex" Cobb as Bert Zupanic; Art Evans as Argyle Saperstein; Jack McGee as Angry Bob; Rob Van Dam as Death Angel; Gene LeBell as Bartender; Arlene Pileggi as Woman Who Looks Like Scully; Steve Kiziak as Man Who Looks Like Mulder; Cory Blevins as Missionary #1; Brian Chenoweth as Missionary #2; Jim Hanna as Koko's Manager #2

Episode chronology
← Previous "Hollywood A.D."	Next → "Je Souhaite"
- The X-Files season 7

"Fight Club" is the twentieth episode of the seventh season of the science fiction television series The X-Files. It premiered on the Fox network in the United States on May 7, 2000. It was written by series creator Chris Carter, directed by Paul Shapiro, and featured a guest appearance by Kathy Griffin. The episode plot serves as a "Monster-of-the-Week" story, which is unconnected to the series' wider mythology. "Fight Club" earned a Nielsen household rating of 6.9, being watched by 11.70 million people in its initial broadcast. The episode received mostly negative reviews from television critics.

The show centers on FBI special agents Fox Mulder (David Duchovny) and Dana Scully (Gillian Anderson) who work on cases linked to the paranormal, called X-Files. Mulder is a believer in the paranormal, while the skeptical Scully has been assigned to debunk his work. In this episode, Mulder and Scully run into a pair of doppelgangers, who, whenever they draw near to one another, cause disaster to unfold. Splitting up, the agents try to find out "why" and "what" they are doing.

"Fight Club" was inspired by a "long-lost nugget" of a story that series creator Chris Carter had thought up a while back about "mis-matched twins that had an almost nuclear reaction when they were around each other." Steve Kiziak and Arlene Pileggi—David Duchovny's stunt double and Mitch Pileggi's wife, respectively—were chosen to play the Mulder and Scully look-alikes at the start of the episode. "Fight Club" contained several scenes of intense action that necessitated the use of various stunt doubles and extras.

== Plot ==
In Kansas City, Kansas, two religious missionaries visit two women at two different homes in the same neighborhood who look exactly alike. The second woman yells at them to go away and the two men, inexplicably, get into a fight in the second woman's front yard. Later, two FBI agents who look and sound remarkably similar to Mulder and Scully visit the first woman, Betty Templeton (Kathy Griffin). Betty claims to have never seen the other woman before. The other woman then passes her by in a car and the two agents begin fighting each other, much like the missionaries. They are severely injured after the gruesome mauling. Both agents, who had worked together for seven years, said that they were possessed. Meanwhile, the other woman, Lulu Pfeiffer (also Griffin), fails to get a job at a copy shop because of her work history. When she becomes aggravated, all the copies suddenly become black. The other woman, Betty, goes to a similar job with a similar resume.

Fox Mulder (David Duchovny) and Dana Scully (Gillian Anderson) begin to investigate the case. Later, in a bar, a man named Bert Zupanic (Randall "Tex" Cobb) comes across Betty. Moments later, as Lulu walks in, an earthquake occurs which breaks all the glass in the bar. Lulu then runs out. Mulder finds out through a man named Argyle Saperstein (Art Evans) that Bert is in a relationship with one of the identical women, and that Bert is a professional wrestler. Scully finds that for the past twelve years, the women have followed each other across seventeen states and left mayhem in their wake. Bert is contacted by Argyle, who he is indebted to. It is revealed that while Bert is dating Lulu, he has also been having an affair with Betty. A second earthquake occurs as Lulu prepares to walk in on Bert and Argyle exchanging money. After Betty emerges from the bathroom, the two see each other and the glass in the building begins breaking. Bert is knocked unconscious while Argyle takes the money and leaves.

Mulder and Scully decide to split up and interrogate the doppelgangers. Betty tells Mulder that Lulu is causing all of the problems and forcing her to leave, while Lulu tells Scully the same thing. Later, the two look-alikes pass each other and a sewer grate blows open, sucking Mulder into a storm drain and sealing him in. Scully finds that the girls share the same father, a man by the name of Bob Damphouse, who is in prison and in a perpetual fit of rage due to insanity. Eventually, Mulder finds his way out of the storm drain. At the prison, Scully meets a man that looks exactly like Bert. Lulu and Betty meet at a stadium and everyone in the audience breaks into a fight. They stop when the other Bert shows up, only to start again when the Berts see each other. The episode ends with Mulder and Scully shown bruised and beaten.

== Production ==
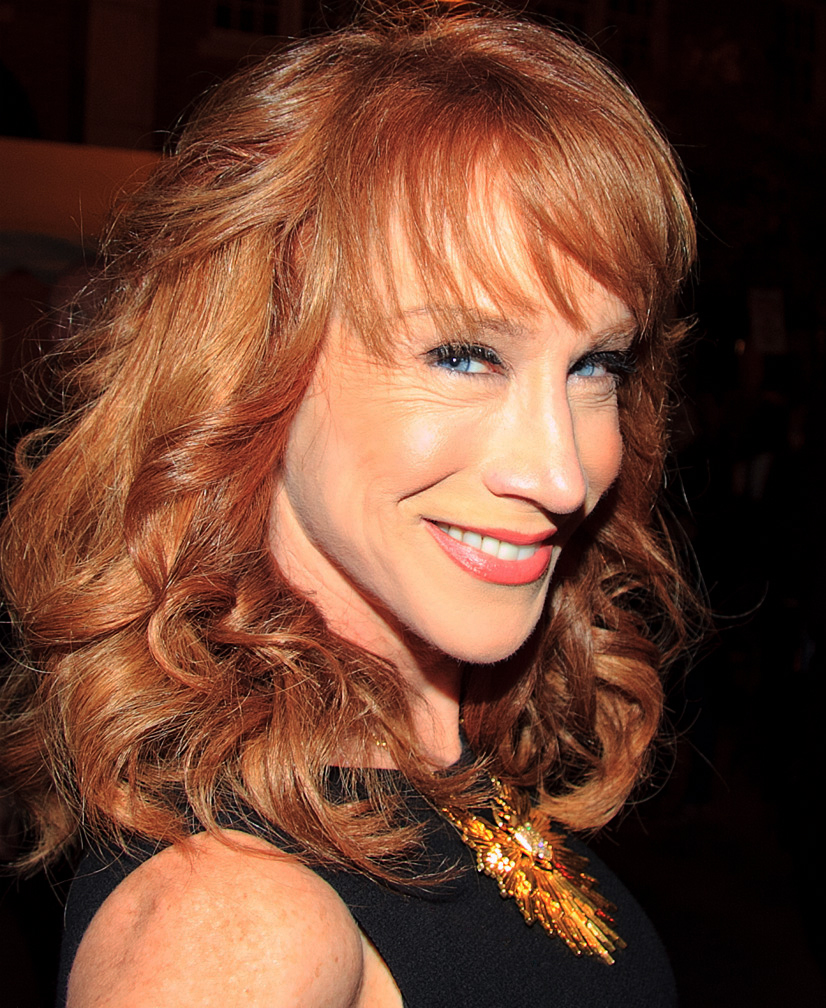
The episode guest starred Kathy Griffin, who played both Lulu and Betty Templeton.

=== Writing ===
According to series creator Chris Carter, "Fight Club" developed from an idea that he had developed prior to the start of the season "about mis-matched twins that had an almost nuclear reaction when they were around each other." Carter was under intense pressure when he wrote the scripts for "Fight Club", as he was also writing the pilot script for the X-Files spin-off, The Lone Gunmen. Because of the stress in juggling two scripts at once, the "'Fight Club' script reflected the insanity" of Carter's task, according to author Marc Shapiro. Executive producer Frank Spotnitz concurred, noting that when he first looked at the script, he felt that "[the episode] had an odd tone. It felt like a wild show."

=== Casting ===
The casting for the episode was reportedly hectic. Rick Millikan, the show's casting director, chose Randall "Tex" Cobb as Bert Zupanic and comedian Kathy Griffin as the doppelgangers. Two wrestlers—Gene LeBell and Rob Van Dam—were also hired to play a bartender and Zupanic's opponent, respectively. Near the beginning of the episode, two FBI agents who bear a striking resemblance, in both physical appearance and voice, to Mulder and Scully appear. These characters were played by Steve Kiziak and Arlene Pileggi. Kiziak had previously served as David Duchovny's stunt double since the third season episode "2Shy". Pileggi is married to Mitch Pileggi, who portrayed Walter Skinner on the show. Duchovny and Anderson later dubbed their voices over Kiziak and Pileggi's.

Jack McGee was cast as Bob Damphouse, the father of the half-sisters with a severe anger issue. During rehearsals for his scene, McGee purposely kept his voice down to prevent a severe headache. He recalled, "I remember the director [Paul Shapiro], he wanted me to scream during rehearsal, and I was, like, 'Look, you don't understand: If I do this, I’m gonna have a headache in 30 fucking seconds.'" The scenes were rehearsed about five or six times before the actual scene was filmed.

=== Filming and effects ===
Paul Shapiro was tasked with directing the episode, and many of the physical effects in the episode were coordinated by Danny Weselis. Regarding the latter task, the episode contained several scenes featuring extensive stunt work, and Weselis later explained, "During the bar explosions we had a room full of stunt people showered with broken glass. And we used stunt people for much of the missionary and special agent fights." The final scene, featuring a stadium full of people attacking each other after the Templetons make an appearance, was filmed at the Grand Olympic Auditorium in Los Angeles and made use of "several hundred" extras, many of whom were solicited via internet postings and ads that had been placed in "selected publications". Sixteen trained stuntmen and around 200 cardboard cutouts supplemented the hundreds of extras to give the stadium its final, filled-out feel. When filming the crowd fight, producer Harry Bring later noted, "a few of [the audience] members got carried away and we had to tell them to settle down." During post-production, a split screen was used by the editors as a way to "enhanc[e] the scene" and "allo[w] the viewer to focus on various angles of action".

== Broadcast and reception ==
"Fight Club" first aired in the United States on May 7, 2000. This episode earned a Nielsen rating of 6.9, with an 11 share, meaning that roughly 6.9 percent of all television-equipped households, and 11 percent of households watching television, were tuned in to the episode. It was viewed by 11.70 million viewers. The episode aired in the United Kingdom and Ireland on Sky1 on July 30, 2000, and received 0.67 million viewers, making it the third most watched episode that week.

Critical reception to "Fight Club" was largely negative. Zack Handlen of The A.V. Club gave the episode a "D−"; he called it "dire stuff" and wrote that "there’s something rancid about forced quirk; it’s rotten and smug". Handlen both criticized Griffin's inability to portray two separate characters, as well as Carter's failure at writing a comedic script. He also felt that the "relentless self-awareness isn’t amusing anymore". Tom Kessenich, in his book Examinations, gave the episode a scathing review. He wrote "If it is indeed true that somewhere out in this vast world we all have an identical twin, I have but one wish for mine. I sincerely hope he was spared the hour of torture that 'Fight Club' imposed upon me." Christina Brzustoski from 11th Hour Magazine opined that "Just when you thought The X-Files couldn't get a more grating guest star than Victoria Jackson, Chris Carter manages to top himself yet again with not one, but two, for the love of God, two Kathy Griffins in the Carter-penned episode 'Fight Club.' It's a safe bet this disjointed, lame episode will probably not be easily confused with the far superior David Fincher movie of the same name. But then the current state of The X-Files makes Elmo in Grouchland look like an Oscar contender."

Kenneth Silber from Space.com was very negative towards the episode, saying, "This episode conveys a strong sense of a writer, director and actors merely going through the motions, collecting their sizable paychecks while running out the clock on the season and series. The plot is not compelling, the agents themselves seem not to take it seriously, and the doppelgangers around whom the action revolves are little more than ciphers." Robert Shearman, in his book Wanting to Believe: A Critical Guide to The X-Files, Millennium & The Lone Gunmen, rated the episode one star out of five. The author wrote, "'Fight Club' is a marker for a series that seems to want to die now, please. […] it's tonally one of the most atypical episodes the series ever made, conceived in spite and self-loathing and sheer exhaustion." Paula Vitaris from Cinefantastique gave the episode a largely negative review and awarded it one star out of four. Vitaris criticized the use of Kathy Griffin and asserted, "the guest cast is one of the worst ever. […] Griffin […] simply is not up to the task; she can not differentiate Betty and Lulu at all […] and she reads every line as if she were still on her cancelled sitcom." i09 reviewer Cyriaque Lama named "The Kathy Griffin Twins" the tenth "Most Ridiculous X-Files Monsters of the Week", and derided her performance as the Templeton twins. In 2016, in a ranking of all episodes of the series from best to worst, Vulture.com named "Fight Club" the worst episode of the series.

Not all reviews were so negative. Rich Rosell from DigitallyObsessed.com awarded the episode 4.5 out of 5 stars and noted that "There are some great visual moments in Fight Club, and Chris Carter reveals an almost Vince Gilligan-side to him with his comic writing here."

== Bibliography ==
- Gradnitzer, Louisa; Pittson, Todd (1999). X Marks the Spot: On Location with The X-Files. Arsenal Pulp Press. ISBN 1-55152-066-4.
- Kessenich, Tom (2002). Examination: An Unauthorized Look at Seasons 6–9 of the X-Files. Trafford Publishing. ISBN 1-55369-812-6.
- Shapiro, Marc (2000). All Things: The Official Guide to the X-Files Volume 6. Harper Prism. ISBN 0-06-107611-2.
- Shearman, Robert (2009). Wanting to Believe: A Critical Guide to The X-Files, Millennium & The Lone Gunmen. Mad Norwegian Press. ISBN 978-0-9759446-9-1.
