= Je Souhaite =

- The X-Files episode
- Dana Scully uses yellow dust to see the invisible body of Anson Stokes. The scene required the use of various digital techniques like chroma keying and motion control.
- Episode no.: Season 7 Episode 21
- Directed by: Vince Gilligan
- Written by: Vince Gilligan
- Production code: 7ABX21
- Original air date: May 14, 2000
- Running time: 44 minutes

Guest appearances
- Mitch Pileggi as Walter Skinner; Paula Sorge as Jenn; Kevin Weisman as Anson Stokes; Will Sasso as Leslie Stokes; Paul Hayes as Jay Gilmore; Brett Bell as Morgue Attendant

Episode chronology
← Previous "Fight Club"	Next → "Requiem"
- The X-Files season 7

"Je Souhaite" is the twenty-first episode of the seventh season of the science fiction television series The X-Files. It premiered on the Fox network in the United States on May 14, 2000. It was written and directed by Vince Gilligan. The episode is a "Monster-of-the-Week" story, unconnected to the series' wider mythology. "Je Souhaite" earned a Nielsen household rating of 8.2, being watched by 12.79 million people in its initial broadcast, and received mostly positive reviews from critics. The title means "I Wish" in French.

The show centers on FBI special agents Fox Mulder (David Duchovny) and Dana Scully (Gillian Anderson) who work on cases linked to the paranormal, called X-Files. Mulder is a believer in the paranormal, while the skeptical Scully has been assigned to debunk his work. In this episode, Mulder and Scully encounter a man and his physically disabled brother who lead the agents to an indifferent jinniyah whose willingness to grant wishes belies a deeper motive.

Gilligan had written and helped produce earlier episodes of The X-Files, but "Je Souhaite" was his directorial debut. Originally, the script was supposed to be a "stark and scary" story, but Gilligan changed it to a humorous tale about a genie. The episode featured several elaborate "genie effects" that were created through digital technology; this included manipulating stock footage of former American President Richard Nixon and Italian dictator Benito Mussolini. One scene in the episode required the producers to block off eight blocks of downtown Los Angeles.

== Plot ==
In St. Louis, an apathetic employee at a self storage facility named Anson Stokes finds a woman wrapped in a rug. When his boss, Jay Gilmore, yells at him, Gilmore's mouth inexplicably disappears. FBI agents Fox Mulder (David Duchovny) and Dana Scully (Gillian Anderson) later investigate and see the same mysterious woman at the home of Anson and his paraplegic brother, Leslie.

The woman is revealed to be a jinniyah. Anson has already wasted two of his wishes: one for his boss to stop talking (which made Gilmore's mouth disappear), and another for a boat (which has materialized in his tiny front yard). Anson then wishes to turn invisible at will. After stripping naked and jumping into the middle of the street, he is accidentally killed by a truck while invisible. Scully later performs an autopsy on Anson's invisible body by covering it with powder, allowing her to see it. Meanwhile, Mulder traces the jinniyah through history and determines her origins.

Leslie takes possession of the jinniyah and wishes Anson back to life. However, because Leslie forgot to specify the condition in which Anson should return, Anson is resurrected as a mute, decaying zombie. Leslie then wishes for him to talk, which results in Anson screaming that he is cold. Leslie then wishes for functional legs, but Anson accidentally blows up their home while trying to light the stove.

Mulder learns that the jinniyah is 500 years old and that she had gained her powers from an ifrit. Because Mulder unrolled her, he receives three wishes. He first wishes for peace on Earth, causing the entire human population except himself to disappear; he then uses his second wish to undo the first. Before making his final wish, Mulder realizes that a jinniyah's power should not be used to force people to be good, and so he wishes for the jinniyah to be free.

== Production ==
I was beyond nervous. I was having hysterical diarrhea for weeks leading up to when I knew we were going to start production.

— Vince Gilligan, on the stress of directing

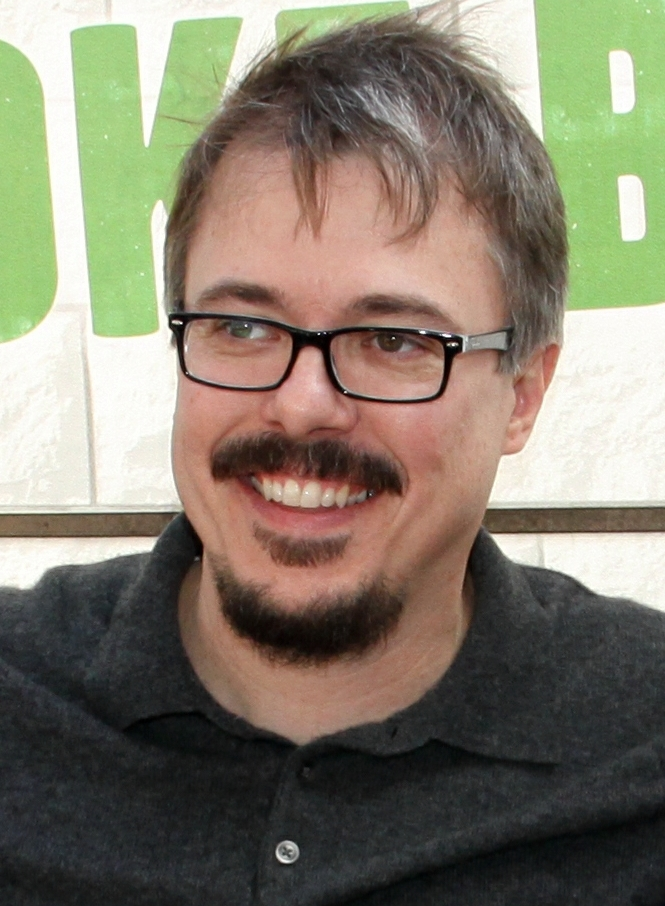
"Je Souhaite" was the first episode Vince Gilligan directed

=== Writing and directing ===
The episode—whose title means "I wish" in French—was written and directed by long-time X-Files contributor Vince Gilligan. Gilligan noted that, "From the very beginning I always had the intention of directing an episode, but I kept putting it off because I figured I didn't know enough." As season seven neared its end, Gilligan decided to finally direct an episode, as he feared that it might be the show's last season. Initially, Gilligan's first script was a "stark and scary" outing for the show. He eventually changed his mind and submitted a more light-hearted story about a jinniyah.

Gilligan soon approached Carter for feedback. Carter was impressed with the story, saying, "Vince had been playing around with somebody finding something in a storage locker. He played around with several different ideas and one day he came in with one idea of a genie and three wishes. The one thing I noticed right away was that the relationship between Mulder and the genie was very sweet." After finalizing his script, Gilligan began to worry that he had "painted himself in a corner": "I did not intend to write a hard episode to direct [...] But before I realize it, I was blowing up a trailer, having a truck hit an invisible man, and all sorts of genie effects. [...] I looked at all the people on the set [...] and thought, 'Oh man, I'm going to be exposed as an impostor.'" Luckily, the cast and crew helped the new director ease into his position.

=== Special effects ===
The scene that features Scully applying yellow powder to an invisible body made use of various digital techniques. The first shot of the scene used a blue head cast of Kevin Weisman, the actor who portrayed Stokes. Gillian Anderson then added the yellow dust onto the cast. The second shot used motion control in order to match the film up exactly with the previously shot scene. Anderson then attempted to match her movements so that, when the two strips of film were combined during the editing stage, they would create the illusion of one composite whole. Finally, various close-ups of the blue head cast were filmed, with the blue color being removed via chroma keying. Paul Rabwin later called the scene "very effective."

During the episode, Mulder shows Scully several bits of archival footage of Richard Nixon and Benito Mussolini that include footage of the jinniyah. In order to create the Nixon scene, the production crew used a real clip of Nixon, his wife Pat, and his daughter Tricia Nixon Cox. The crew then cut a matte in order to replace certain parts, with Nixon's daughter being excised to make room for the jinniyah. Paula Sorge, who played Jenn, was then blue screened and the subsequent shot was "dirtied up" to properly age the film. The scenes were then combined.

During the scene where Mulder wanders into a deserted city street, the production crew had to close off eight blocks of downtown Los Angeles. The only practical way of doing this was to shoot on a Sunday morning, when hardly anyone was out on the street. Filming the scene did not go as planned: a homeless person "walked right through the ... perfect take", according to producer Harry Bring. Luckily, the production crew was able to use digital technology to erase the man during post-production.

== Broadcast and reception ==
"Je Souhaite" first aired in the United States on May 14, 2000. This episode earned a Nielsen rating of 8.2, with a 13 share, meaning that roughly 8.2 percent of all television-equipped households, and 13 percent of households watching television, were tuned in to the episode. It was viewed by 12.79 million viewers. The episode aired in the United Kingdom and Ireland on Sky1 on August 6, 2000, and received 0.72 million viewers, making it the fourth most watched episode that week.

The episode received mostly positive reviews with one detractor. Emily St. James of The A.V. Club awarded the episode an "A−" and called it her "favorite episode of season seven" and that she wished that "it had been the series finale" for The X-Files. St. James argued that the episode possessed a "warmth and tenderness" that was missing from the following two seasons, after Duchovny left the series as a full-time star. She concluded that "the genius of 'Je Souhaite' lies in how it embraces the inherent weirdness of the world this show is set in." Rob Bricken from Topless Robot named "Je Souhaite" the second most funny X-Files episode, writing, "Best line: When Scully, ever the skeptic, begins trying to rationalize her examination of an invisible body, Mulder replies with an exasperated, 'Oh!' It's what most of us had been thinking for years about Scully's refusal to acknowledge all the strange crap she had seen."

Robert Shearman, in his book Wanting to Believe: A Critical Guide to The X-Files, Millennium & The Lone Gunmen, rated the episode five stars out of five. The author praised the writing and noted that "if ['Je Souhaite'] had been the final stand-alone episode of the series, as it so easily might have been, it'd have been nevertheless appropriate. [...] it marks the end of an era; it's a perfect note of bliss which the series will never be able to capture again. Paula Vitaris from Cinefantastique gave the episode a moderately positive review and awarded it two-and-a-half stars out of four. She called Paula Sorge "one of the best guest actors of the season" and praised her acting, noting that she delivers her lines "with snap, bite, and wonderful dark humor." Vitaris, however, did note that the episode "would have worked better if it had consisted of a half-hour encounter between Mulder, Scully, and Jenn, and she heavily criticized the stereotypical portrayal of the guest cast as a group of poor Southerners.

Not all reviews were positive. Kenneth Silber from Space.com wrote, "'Je Souhaite' offers a few laughs but little drama and no intellectual substance. The episode seems designed to stall for time while negotiations drag on over David Duchovny's contract and the series' future. X-Files viewers will wish for—and deserve—better material than this I Dream of Jeannie rehash."

== Bibliography ==
- Hurwitz, Matt; Knowles, Chris (2008). The Complete X-Files. Insight Editions. ISBN 978-1-933784-80-9.
- Shapiro, Marc (2000). All Things: The Official Guide to the X-Files Volume 6. Harper Prism. ISBN 0-06-107611-2.
- Shearman, Robert (2009). Wanting to Believe: A Critical Guide to The X-Files, Millennium & The Lone Gunmen. Mad Norwegian Press. ISBN 978-0-9759446-9-1.
