= X-Cops =

- The X-Files episode
- Fox Mulder talking to Deputy Wetzel about the monster. The episode was filmed in the same style as the reality television series Cops.
- Episode no.: Season 7 Episode 12
- Directed by: Michael Watkins
- Written by: Vince Gilligan
- Production code: 7ABX12
- Original air date: February 20, 2000
- Running time: 44 minutes

Guest appearances
- Judson Mills as Deputy Keith Wetzel; Perla Walter as Mrs. Guerrero; Dee Freeman as Sergeant Paula Duthie; Lombardo Boyar as Deputy Juan Molina; Solomon Eversole as Ricky; J. W. Smith as Steve; Curtis C. as Edy; Maria Celedonio as Chantara Gomez; Frankie Ray as Crackhead; Tara Karsian as Coroner's Assistant; Daniel Emmett as Cameraman; John Michael Vaughn as Soundman

Episode chronology
← Previous "Closure"	Next → "First Person Shooter"
- The X-Files season 7

"X-Cops" is the twelfth episode of the seventh season of the American science fiction television series The X-Files. Directed by Michael Watkins and written by Vince Gilligan, the installment serves as a "Monster-of-the-Week" story—a stand-alone plot unconnected to the overarching mythology of The X-Files. Originally aired in the United States by the Fox network on February 20, 2000, "X-Cops" received a Nielsen rating of 9.7 and was seen by 16.56 million viewers. The episode earned positive reviews from critics, largely due to its unique presentation, as well as its use of humor. Since its airing, the episode has been named among the best episodes of The X-Files by several reviewers.

The X-Files centers on Federal Bureau of Investigation (FBI) special agents Fox Mulder (David Duchovny) and Dana Scully (Gillian Anderson), who work on cases linked to the paranormal, called X-Files. Mulder is a believer in the paranormal; the skeptical Scully was initially assigned to debunk his work, but the two have developed a deep friendship. In this episode, Mulder and Scully are investigating an X-File that takes place during an episode of the Fox reality television program Cops. Mulder believes he is hunting a werewolf, but discovers that the monster is actually feeding on fear. While Mulder embraces the publicity of Cops, Scully is frustrated by the presence of the film crew.

"X-Cops" is a fictitious crossover with Cops. The episode was inspired by Cops, which Gilligan enjoyed watching. He pitched the idea several times to series creator Chris Carter and the series writing staff. The idea was met with a mixed reception, but Gilligan was eventually given the green light to produce the episode because the series was nearing its end with the conclusion of the seventh season. In keeping with the format of the real-life Cops program, the entire episode was shot on videotape and featured several members of the Cops crew. The episode has been thematically analyzed for its use of postmodernism and its presentation as reality television.

== Plot ==
The episode begins with the Cops intro before cutting to Keith Wetzel (Judson Mills), a deputy with the Los Angeles County Sheriff's Department. He and the Cops film crew are in Willow Park, California, a fictitious high-crime district of Los Angeles. Mrs. Guererro (Perla Walter) reports a monster in her neighborhood. Wetzel investigates, expecting to find a dog, but whatever he finds causes him to scream and flee. Wetzel and the film crew run back to Wetzel's police car, but whatever Wetzel saw flips the car over. Wetzel later claims to have encountered and been attacked by gang members. Police soon surround Mulder and Scully, believing them to be criminals, but soon discover they are FBI agents investigating an alleged fatal werewolf attack during the last full moon. Mulder and Scully interview Mrs. Guerrero, who describes the monster to a sketch artist. To Mulder's surprise, she describes not a werewolf, but the horror movie villain Freddy Krueger.

Ricky, the sketch artist, is found murdered nearby shortly afterward. A broken pink fingernail at the scene leads Mulder and Scully to a local prostitute, Chantara. When the agents track down Chantara, whose face is pixelated, she claims that her pimp attacked Ricky and fears that he will kill her next. She pleads with the agents for protection. Mulder and Scully have Wetzel guard Chantara while they assist police in the raid of a crack house. The two are drawn back outside when Wetzel again encounters the entity, wildly shooting at it. Inside a police car, the agents find Chantara with her neck broken.

When Mulder questions Wetzel, he admits that he thought he saw the "wasp man", a monster his older brother told him about when he was a kid. Though other deputies express skepticism, an officer finds flattened bullets; indicating they physically impacted something, though no trace is found of what they struck. Mulder formulates a theory that the entity changes its form to correspond with its victims' worst fears. Wetzel, Ricky and Chantara all expressed fear shortly before their run-ins with the entity; it was visible to them, but not to others. The agents think that Steve and Edy, a gay couple, may be the entity's next target because they were in the vicinity of Ricky's attack. They head to their house, only to find the couple in the middle of an argument. After Edy expresses fear of a separation from Steve, the couple reconciles. Based on this situation, Mulder proposes that the entity ignored Steve and Edy because they did not exhibit mortal fear.

Mulder believes that the entity travels from victim to victim like a contagion. At his request, Scully performs an autopsy on Chantara's body at the morgue. During the procedure, a conversation between Scully and the coroner's assistant (Tara Karsian) causes the latter to panic about a hantavirus outbreak. The entity suddenly kills her with the disease. When Mulder discusses the death with Scully, he realizes that Wetzel is in danger of being revisited by the entity. The agents and police return to the crack house, where the entity has trapped an injured Wetzel in an upstairs room. The agents are unable to enter the room until the morning comes when the entity disappears and spares Wetzel's life.

== Production ==
=== Conception and writing ===
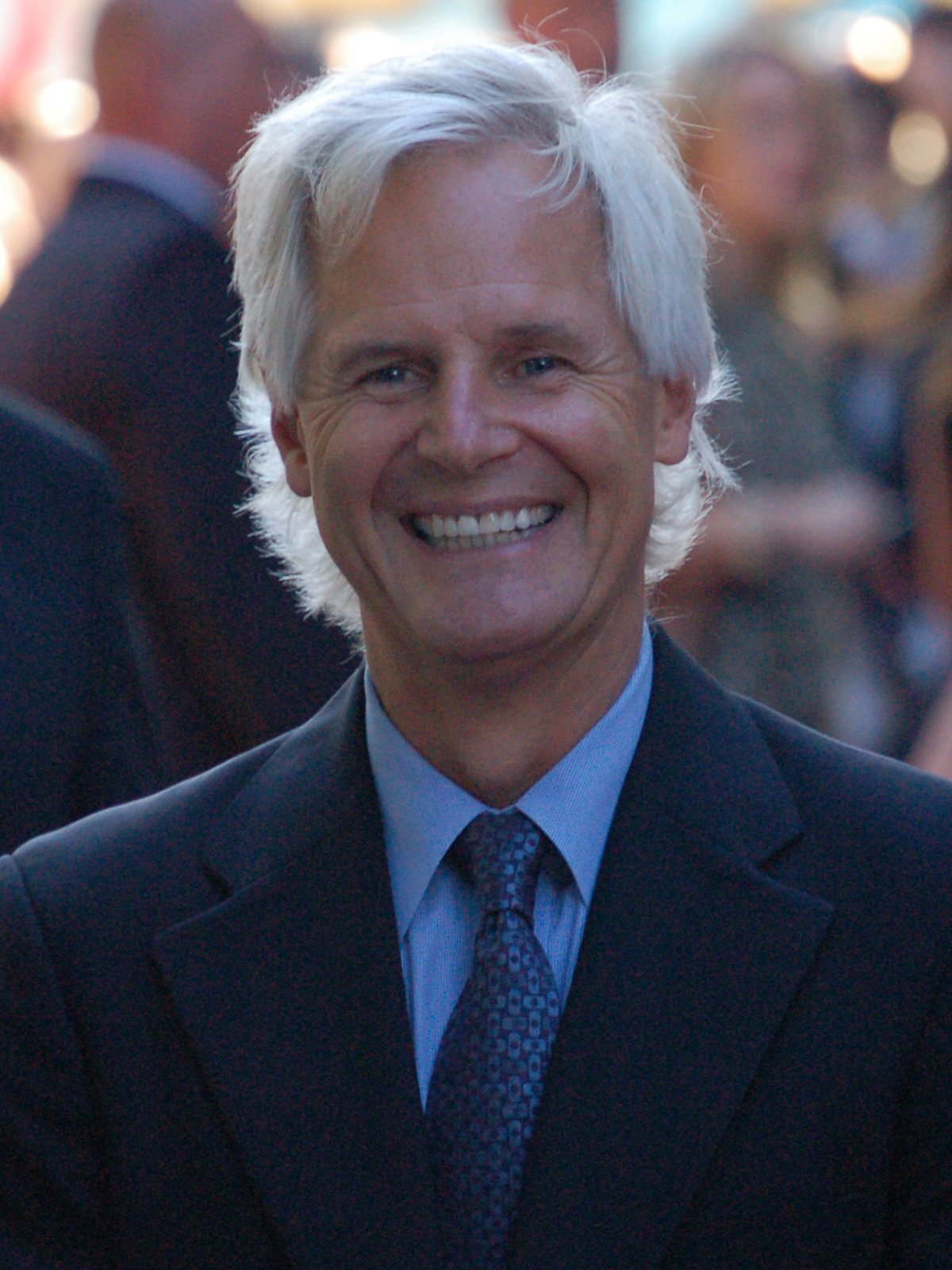
The concept of the episode was approved by series creator Chris Carter in the show's seventh season, after it had been vetoed several times before.

"X-Cops" was inspired by the Fox television program Cops, which Vince Gilligan (the writer of this episode) describes as a "great slice of Americana." Gilligan first pitched the idea during the show's fourth season to the X-Files writing staff and series creator Chris Carter, the latter of whom was concerned that the concept was too "goofy". Fellow writer and producer Frank Spotnitz concurred, although he was more uncomfortable with Gilligan's idea of using videotape instead of film; the show's production crew liked to use film to create "effective scares", and Spotnitz worried that shooting exclusively on videotape would be too challenging as the series would be unable to cut and edit the final product. During the show's seventh season, Carter relented. Many critics and fans believed, erroneously, that the seventh season of The X-Files would be the show's last. Similarly, Carter felt that the show had nearly run its course, and seeing the potential in Gilligan's idea, he decided to green-light the episode. Gilligan noted that "the longer we've been on the air, the more chances we've taken. We try to keep the show fresh ... I think [Carter] appreciates that". "X-Cops" was not Gilligan's first attempt at writing a cross-over. Almost three years before, he had developed a script that would have taken the form of an Unsolved Mysteries episode, with unknown actors playing Mulder and Scully and Robert Stack appearing in his role as narrator. This concept was later abandoned, and the script was re-written into the fifth-season episode "Bad Blood".

Gilligan reasoned that, because Mulder and Scully would appear on a nationally syndicated television series, the episode's main monster could not be shown, only "hinted at". Gilligan and the writing staff applied methods previously used in the psychological horror film The Blair Witch Project (1999) to show as little of the monster as possible while still making the episode scary. Michael Watkins, who directed the episode, hired several real Sheriff's deputies as extras for the episode. Casting director Rick Milikan later explained that the group needed "actors who could pull off the believability in just normal off-the-cuff conversation of cops on the job." During the crack house scene, real SWAT team members were hired to break down the doors. Actor Judson Mills later explained that, because there were few cameramen and owing to the manner in which the episode was filmed, "people just behaved as if we were [real] cops. I had other cops waving and giving their signals or heads-up the way they do amongst themselves. It was quite funny".

=== Filming and post-production ===
What was surprising to all of us was how little time it took to shoot. We basically did one or two takes of something and that was it.

— Gillian Anderson, discussing the videotaping of "X-Cops"

When members of The X-Files staff asked Cops producer John Langley about a potential cross-over, the crew of Cops liked the idea and "offered their total cooperation." Gilligan even attended the shooting of an episode. Inspired by Cops, Watkins' directing style was unique for this episode, and he even directly filmed some of the scenes himself. He also brought in Bertram van Munster, a cameraman for Cops, to shoot scenes to give the finished product an authentic feel. In an attempt at realism, other staff members from Cops participated in the production: Daniel Emmet and John Michael Vaughn, two Cops crew members, were featured during the episode's climax. During rehearsals, Watkins kept the cameras away from the set, so that when videotaping commenced, the cameramen's unfamiliarity would create the "unscripted" feel of a documentary. In addition, a Cops editor was brought in "to insert the trademark blur over the faces of innocent bystanders." "X-Cops" was filmed in Venice, Los Angeles and Long Beach, California.

Due to the nature of the shooting schedule, the episode was relatively cheap to film and production moved at a quick pace. Initially, the actors struggled with the new cinéma vérité style of the episode, and several takes were needed for scenes during the first few days, but these problems receded as taping progressed. On one night, three-and-a-half pages of script were shot in only two hours; the normal rate for The X-Files was three to four pages a day. Both Watkins and Mills likened the filming process to live theater, with the former noting, "In a sense, we were doing theater: we were doing an act or half of a whole act in one take." Anderson called the performance "fun" to shoot, and highlighted "Scully getting pissed off at the camera crew" as her favorite part to play. She further noted that "it was interesting to make the adjustment to playing something more real than you might play for television."

Although recorded to create the illusion that scenes were recorded in single takes, the episode employed several camera tricks and effects. For the opening shot, a "surreptitious cut" helped to replace actor Judson Mills with a stunt person when the cop car is overturned by the monster. Usually, an episode of The X-Files required editors to make between 800–1200 film cuts, but "X-Cops" only required 45. During post-production, a minor argument broke out between Vince Gilligan and the network. Originally, Gilligan did not want the X-Files logo to appear at any time during the episode. He stressed that he wanted "X-Cops" to feel like an "episode of Cops that happened to involve Mulder and Scully." The network, fearing that people would not understand that "X-Cops" was actually an episode of The X-Files, vetoed this idea. A compromise was eventually reached: the episode would open with the Cops theme song, but The X-Files credits would also appear after the opening scene. In addition, the commercial bumpers would feature red and blue lights flashing across The X-Files logo while dialogue is heard in the background, in a similar fashion to the Cops logo. The episode also features a disclaimer at the beginning informing viewers that the episode is a special installment of The X-Files to prevent watchers from thinking that the show "has been preempted this week by Cops".

== Themes ==
Several critics, such as M. Keith Booker, have argued that "X-Cops" is an example of The X-Files delving into the postmodern school of thought. Postmodernism has been described as a "style and concept in the arts [that] is characterized by the self-conscious use of earlier styles and conventions [and the] mixing of different artistic styles and media". According to Booker, the episode helps to "identify the series as postmodern [due to its] cumulative summary of modern American culture", or, in this case, the show's merging with another popular television series. The episode also serves as an example of the series' "self-consciousness in terms of its status as a (fictional) television" show.

According to Jeremy Butler's book Television Style, the episode, along with many other found footage-type movies and shows, helps to suggest that what is being promoted as "live TV", is actually a series of events that have already unfolded in the past. Even though the episode is "self-conscious", "reflexive", and humorous, the real-time aspects of "X-Cops" "heighten[s] the sense of realism within the episode", and makes the result come across as hyper-realistic. This sense of realism is further heightened by the near lack of music in the episode; aside from the title theme, Mark Snow's soundtrack is not to be heard.

== Broadcast and reception ==
"X-Cops" was first broadcast in the United States on the Fox network on February 20, 2000. Watched by 16.56 million viewers, according to the Nielsen ratings system, it was the second-highest rated episode of the season, after "The Sixth Extinction". It received a Nielsen rating of 9.7, with a 14 share among viewers, meaning that 9.7 percent of all households in the United States, and 14 percent of people watching television at that time, tuned into the episode. On May 13, 2003, "X-Cops" was released on DVD as part of the complete seventh-season box set.

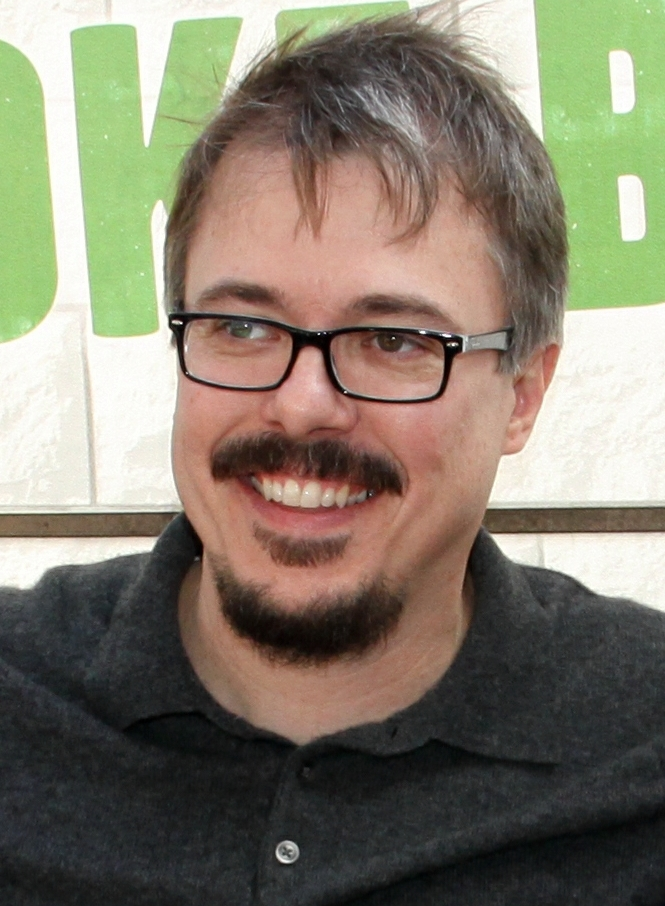
"X-Cops", written by Vince Gilligan, received praise from critics, largely due to its unique format as well as its use of humor.

Initial critical reaction to the episode was generally positive, although a few reviewers felt that the episode was a gimmick. Eric Mink of the Daily News described it as "nifty" and "exceptionally clever." While noting that "The X-Files hasn't exactly smoked this season", Kinney Littlefield from the Orange County Register called "X-Cops" a stand-out episode from the seventh season. Tom Kessenich, in his book Examinations, gave the episode a largely positive review. He called the entry "one of the most entertaining episodes of the season" and "60 minutes of pure fun". Rich Rosell from Digitally Obsessed awarded the episode 5 out of 5 stars and wrote that "some might view it as a stunt, but having Mulder and Scully be part of a spot-on Cops! parody (complete with full "Bad Boys, bad boys" intro) is just brilliant stuff". Not all reviews were positive. Kenneth Silber from Space.com gave the episode a negative review and wrote, "'X-Cops' is a wearisome episode. Watching the agents and police repeatedly run through the darkened streets of Los Angeles after an unseen—and uninteresting—foe evokes merely a sense of futility. The use of the format of the Fox TV show Cops provides some transient novelty but little drama or humor."

Later reviews praised the episode as one of the show's best installments. Robert Shearman, in his book Wanting to Believe: A Critical Guide to The X-Files, Millennium & The Lone Gunmen, rated the episode four stars out of five. Describing the episode as "funny", "clever", and "actually quite frightening", Shearman wrote positively of the faux documentary style, likening it to The Blair Witch Project. Zack Handlen of The A.V. Club awarded the episode an "A–" and called it "witty, inventive, and intermittently spooky". He argued that the episode was a late-series "gimmick episode" and compared it to the last few seasons of House; although he reasoned that House relied on gimmicks to prop itself up, "X-Cops" is "the work of a creative team which may be running out of ideas, but still has enough gas in the tank to get us where we need to go." Furthermore, Handlen felt that the show used the Cops format to the best of its ability and that many of the scenes were humorous, startling, or a combination of both.

Since its airing, "X-Cops" has appeared on several best-of lists. Montreal's The Gazette named it the eighth best X-Files episode, writing that it "pushed the show to new post-modern heights." Rob Bricken from Topless Robot named it the fifth funniest X-Files episode, and Starpulse described it as the funniest X-Files episode, writing that when the series "did comedy, it was probably the funniest drama ever on television". UGO named the episode's main antagonist as one of the greatest "Top 11 X-Files Monsters," noting that the creature is a "perfect [Monster-of-the-Week] if only because the monster in question is a living, breathing metaphor, a never-seen specter that shifts to fit the fears of the person witnessing it." Narin Bahar from SFX named the episode one of the "Best Sci-Fi TV Mockumentaries" and wrote, "Whether you see this as a brilliantly post-modern merging of fact and fiction or shameless cross-promotion of two of the Fox Network's biggest TV shows, there's lots of nods to the real Cops show in this episode". Bahar praised the scene featuring the terrified lady telling Mulder that Freddy Krueger attacked her—calling the scene the "best in-joke"—and applauded the two series' cohesion.
