= Bill Millar (visual effects artist) =

English visual effects artist (1946–2026)

- Born: 23 October 1946; London, England
- Died: 9 January 2026 (aged 79)
- Occupation: Visual effects artist

Bill Millar (23 October 1946 – 9 January 2026) was an English visual effects artist. He won a Primetime Emmy Award and was nominated for one more in the category Outstanding Special Visual Effects for his work on the television program The X-Files.

Millar died on 9 January 2026, at the age of 79.
