= Theresa Geller =

Independent scholar of film theory

Theresa Geller is an independent scholar of film theory. She was previously a scholar in residence at the Beatrice Bain Research Group at the University of California, Berkeley and was a professor at Grinnell College.

She is the author of The X-Files, part of the TV Milestones series out of Wayne State University Press. Her courses focus on cinema studies, literary and film theory, and gender studies. Her research interests include film history and aesthetics, popular media, queer theory, cultural studies, and postmodernism. She has published in the journals American Quarterly, Velvet Light Trap, Senses of Cinema, Rhizomes, and Biography, and has chapters in such scholarly anthologies as Gender After Lyotard and East Asian Cinemas: Exploring Transnational Connections on Film. Her current project examines the subversive possibilities of contemporary genre film and television. Geller earned her B.A. in English and Women's Studies at the University of California,Santa Cruz and her M.A. in English from the University of Illinois Urbana-Champaign. She is also certified in Cinema Studies, Gender and Women's Studies, and Criticism and Interpretive Theory. She received her Ph.D. from Rutgers University.
