= Paul Rabwin =

American television producer

- Born: August 16, 1947 (age 79)
- Occupation: Television producer
- Writing career
- Notable work: The X-Files

Paul Rabwin is an American television producer. He has worked on the supernatural drama series The X-Files. He has been nominated for the Emmy Award for outstanding drama series four times for his work on the show.

== Biography ==
Rabwin joined the crew of The X-Files as a co-producer for the first season in 1993. He returned as a co-producer for the second season in 1994. At the 1995 ceremony Rabwin and the rest of the production team were nominated for the Primetime Emmy Award for Outstanding Drama Series for their work on the second season. Rabwin remained a co-producer for the third season in 1995. At the 1996 ceremony Rabwin and the production team were again nominated for the drama Emmy for the third season. Rabwin remained a co-producer for the fourth season in 1996. The production team were again nominated for the drama Emmy at the 1997 ceremony. Rabwin was promoted to producer for the fifth season in 1997. The production team were nominated for the Emmy Award for Outstanding Drama Series at the 1998 ceremony for a fourth consecutive time for their work on the fifth season. Rabwin remained a producer for the sixth season in 1998. He continued in this role for the seventh season in 1999 and the eighth season in 2000. He was promoted again to supervising producer for the ninth and final season in 2001.

Rabwin also worked on other series created by Chris Carter during this time; Millennium and The Lone Gunmen. He joined the crew of Millennium as a co-producer for the first season in 1996. He held this role for all of the series three seasons. He worked as a producer for the pilot episode of Lone Gunmen in 2001 but did not join the crew when the series was picked up.

He went on to work on the science fiction series FlashForward.

== Awards and nominations ==
- 1995 Emmy Award for Outstanding Drama Series for The X-files season 4
- 1996 Emmy Award for Outstanding Drama Series for The X-files season 4
- 1997 Emmy Award for Outstanding Drama Series for The X-files season 4
- 1998 Emmy Award for Outstanding Drama Series for The X-files season 5
