= List of translations of Beowulf =

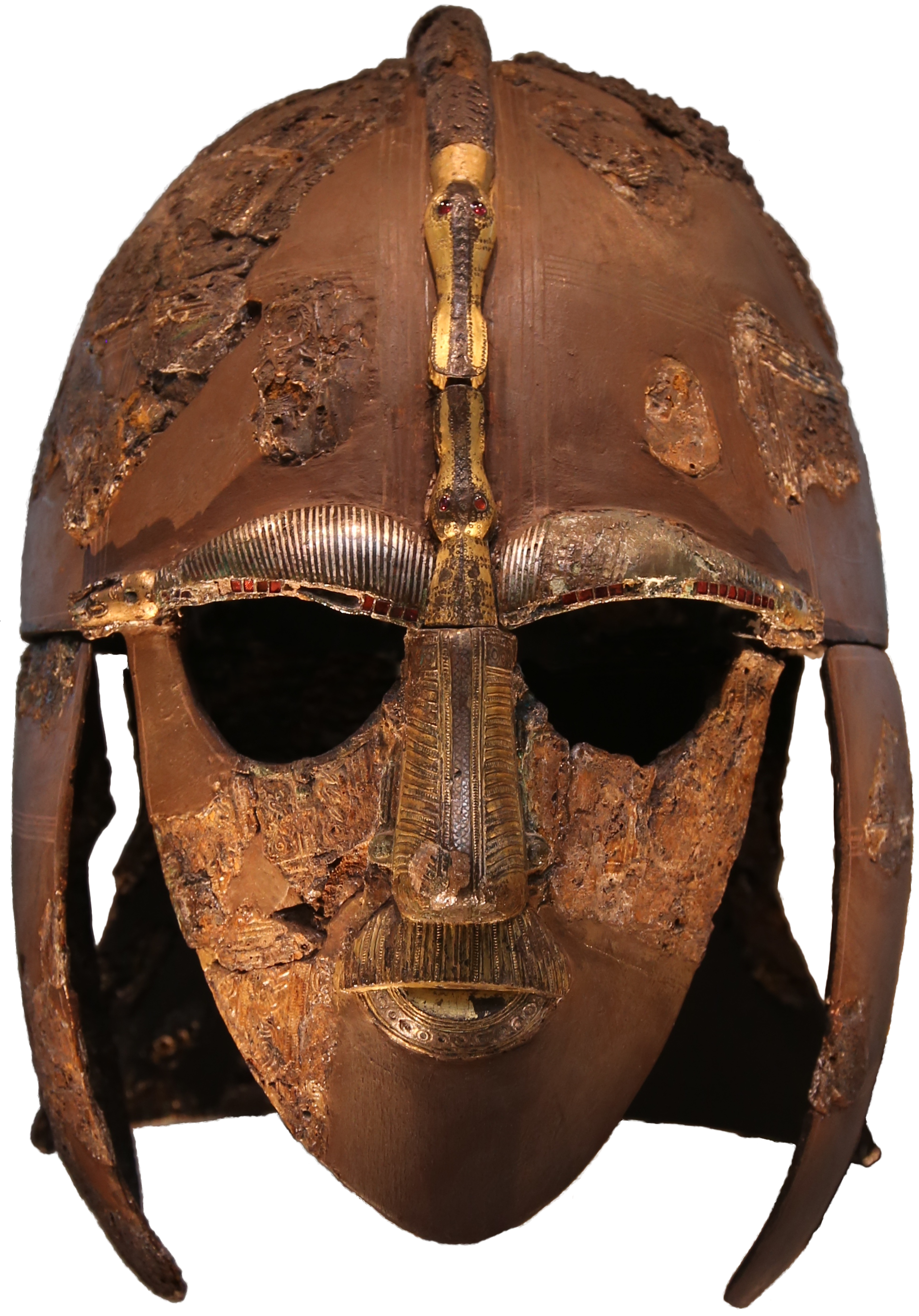
The Sutton Hoo helmet, a high-status treasure from the time of, and with parallels to, Beowulf

This is a list of translations of Beowulf, one of the best-known Old English heroic epic poems. Beowulf has been translated many times in verse and in prose. By 2020, the Beowulf's Afterlives Bibliographic Database listed some 688 translations and other versions of the poem, from Thorkelin's 1787 transcription of the text, and in at least 38 languages.

The poet John Dryden's categories of translation have influenced how scholars discuss variation between translations and adaptations. In the Preface to Ovid's Epistles (1680) Dryden proposed three different types of translation:

metaphrase [...] or turning an author word for word, and line by line, from one language into another; paraphrase [...] or translation with latitude, where the author is kept in view by the translator so as never to be lost, but his words are not so strictly followed as his sense, and that, too, is admitted to be amplified but not altered; and imitation [...] where the translator – if he has not lost that name – assumes the liberty not only to vary from the words and sense, but to forsake them both as he sees occasion; and taking only some general hints from the original, to run division on the ground-work, as he pleases.

The works listed below may fall into more than one of Dryden's categories, but works that are essentially direct translations are listed here. Versions of other kinds that take more "latitude" are listed at List of adaptations of Beowulf.

== Translations ==
There are hundreds of translations or near-translations of Beowulf, and more are added each year, so a complete list may well be unattainable. Listed here are the major versions discussed by scholars, along with the first versions in different languages.

=== English Translations ===
==== 19th century ====
Date	Title	Translator	Location	Publisher	Type	Notes
1837	Beowulf	Kemble, John Mitchell	London	William Pickering	Prose	First complete translation into modern English; archaizing, and translating word-for-word. The 1st ed. in 1833 had no translation.
1849	Beowulf, an epic poem translated from the Anglo-Saxon into English verse	Wackerbarth, A. Diedrich	London	William Pickering	Verse	Walter Scott-like romance verse using rhyme and modern metre (iambic tetrameters), no attempt to imitate alliterative verse
1855	Anglo-Saxon Poems of Beowulf	Thorpe, Benjamin	Oxford	James Wright	Verse, prosaic	Parallel text, with "literal" translation "reading like prose ... chopped up into short lines" as if verse
1876	Beowulf: a Heroic Poem of the Eighth Century, with a translation	Arnold, Thomas, the Younger	London	Longmans, Green	Prose	An archaizing version, translating word-for-word.
1881	Beowulf: an old English poem, translated into modern rhymes	Lumsden, Henry William	London	Kegan Paul	Verse	
1882	Beowulf: an Anglo-Saxon poem, & the Fight at Finnsburg	Garnett, James Mercer, the younger	Boston	Ginn, Heath, & Co.	Verse	"With facsimile of the unique manuscript in the British Museum".
1888	I. Beówulf: an Anglo-Saxon poem. II. The Fight at Finnsburh: a fragment	Harrison, James Albert; Moritz Heyne; Robert Sharp	Boston	X. Ginn & Co.	Prose	Not exactly a translation. Annotated text and long glossary
1892	The Deeds of Beowulf	Earle, John	Oxford	Clarendon Press	Prose	An archaizing version.
1894	Beowulf	Wyatt, Alfred John	Cambridge	Cambridge University Press	Prose	Not exactly a translation. Annotated text and long glossary
1895	The tale of Beowulf sometime King of the folk of the Weder Geats	Morris, William; Alfred John Wyatt	London	Longman	Verse	"Genuinely foreignizing ... medievalizes" in a distinctive style, with "breaking rhythms and irregular syntax ... an insistently archaizing diction and a striking literalism to produce a defamiliarizing effect".
1897	Beowulf: an Anglo-Saxon Epic Poem	Hall, John Lesslie	Lexington	D. C. Heath	Verse	

==== 20th century ====
Date	Title	Translator	Location	Publisher	Type	Notes
1901	Beowulf and the Fight at Finnsburg	John Richard Clark Hall	Cambridge	Cambridge University Press	Prose	A literal approach, somewhat archaic; smoother and more uniform than Kemble. "One of the most enduringly popular of all translations of the poem".
1910	Beowulf	Gummere, Francis B.	New York	The Collier Press	Verse	The Harvard Classics, Charles W. Eliot, (Ed.)
1910	Beowulf	Sedgefield, Walter John	Manchester	University of Manchester	Prose	Not exactly a translation. Annotated text and long glossary
1913	The Story of Beowulf	Kirtlan, Ernest John Brigham	London	C. H. Kelly	Prose	Decorated and designed by Frederick Lawrence.
1914	Beowulf. A Metrical Translation into Modern English	Hall, J. R. Clark	Cambridge	Cambridge University Press	Verse	
1921	Widsith; Beowulf; Finnsburgh; Waldere; Dior [sic], done into Common English after the Old Manner	Charles Scott Moncrieff	London	Chapman and Hall	Verse	With an introduction from Lord Northcliffe. Moncrieff had studied Old English at the University of Edinburgh in 1913.
1922	Beowulf and the Fight at Finnsburg	Klaeber, Frederick	Boston	D. C. Heath and Company	Prose	Classic, continuously in print through 4 editions. Not exactly a translation. Annotated text and long glossary
1923	The Story of Beowulf and Grendel. Retold in modern English prose	Spencer, Richard Augustus	London, Edinburgh	W. & R. Chambers	Prose	
1923	The Song of Beowulf rendered into English prose	Gordon, R. K.	London	J.M. Dent & Sons	Prose	Published without credit in the Simon & Schuster 2005 edition.
1925	Beowulf. Translated into modern English rhyming verse	Strong, Archibald	London	Constable	Verse	
1926	Beowulf. Translated into English verse	Crawford, D. H.	London	Chatto & Windus	Verse	
1933	The Story of Beowulf. Retold from the ancient epic	Riggs, Strafford	New York	D. Appleton-Century	Prose	Decorated by Henry Clarence Pitz.
1940	Beowulf. the oldest English epic. Translated into alliterative verse with a critical introduction	Kennedy, Charles W.	New York	Oxford University Press	Verse, alliterative	OCLC 185407779.
1945	Beowulf. In modern verse with an essay and pictures	Bone, Gavin David	Oxford	Basil Blackwell	Verse	
1949	Beowulf in Modern English. A translation in blank verse	Waterhouse, Mary Elizabeth	Cambridge	Bowes & Bowes	Verse, blank	
1952	Beowulf: A Verse Translation into Modern English	Morgan, Edwin	Berkeley	University of California Press	Verse	Based on Klaeber's text; "of special significance in its own right but also as the beginning of translation of Beowulf into a genuinely modern poetic idiom, leading the way for many later followers down to and beyond Seamus Heaney".
1953	Beowulf, with the Finnsburg fragment	Wrenn, C. L.	London	George G. Harrap & Co.	Prose	A revision of John Richard Clark Hall. Wrenn was one of the Inklings. Fully revised by W. F. Bolton in 1972
1953	Beowulf and Judith	Dobbie, Elliott van Kirk	New York	Columbia University Press	Verse	It is a critical edition of the Old English text with extensive notes but no translation
1954	Beowulf the Warrior	Ian Serraillier	Oxford	Oxford University Press	Verse	Illustrated by John Severin.
1957	Beowulf	Wright, David	Harmondsworth	Penguin Classics	Prose	Reprinted by Panther Books, 1970
1961	Beowulf	Goodrich, Norma Lorre	New York	Mentor	Prose	Excerpts of the main action sequences and plotline.
1963	Beowulf	Raffel, Burton	New York	Signet Classics	Verse	Raffel writes in his essay "On Translating Beowulf" that the poet-translator "needs to master the original in order to leave it".
1966	Beowulf	Donaldson, Ethelbert Talbot	London	Longman	Prose	Widely read in The Norton Anthology of English Literature; accurate, "foreignizing" prose, using asyndetic coordination, "somewhat ponderous but ... dignified tone ... viewed by teachers as dull".
1968	Beowulf	Crossley-Holland, Kevin	London	Macmillan	Prose	The prose has a distinct poetic quality. OCLC 1200055128
1968	Beowulf and its Analogues	Garmonsway, George N.	London	J.M. Dent & Sons	Prose	Hugh Magennis calls this "much-used"; Michael J. Alexander says it has "dignity and rhythmical shape".
1973	Beowulf: A Verse Translation	Alexander, Michael J.	Harmondsworth	Penguin Classics	Verse	Closely "shadows" the original
1977	Beowulf: A Dual-Language Edition	Howell D. Chickering	New York	Anchor Books	Verse	
1983	Beowulf: a Verse Translation with Treasures of the Ancient North	Osborn, Marijane	Berkeley	University of California Press	Verse	
1985	A Readable Beowulf	Stanley B. Greenfield	Carbondale	Southern Illinois University Press	Verse	"Simultaneously a poem and, by virtue of the nature of translation, an act of criticism".(Greenfield, p. ix)
1991	Beowulf: A Verse Translation	Rebsamen, Frederick	New York	HarperCollins	Verse	imitates original's poetic form as closely as possible, with alliterative half-lines; seven prose sections interrupt the translation, instead of using footnotes
1991	Beowulf: Text and Translation	Porter, John	Hockwold-cum-Wilton	Anglo-Saxon Books	Verse	Parallel text; "the most literal"
1999	Beowulf: A New Verse Translation	Heaney, Seamus	London	Faber	Verse	

==== 21st century ====
Date	Title	Translator	Location	Publisher	Type	Notes
2000	Beowulf	Roy Liuzza	Peterborough, Ontario	Broadview Press	Verse	Parallel text. 2nd edition 2013
2010	The Beowulf Manuscript	Fulk, R.D	Cambridge, Mass.	Harvard University Press	Prose	Part of the Dumbarton Oaks Medieval Library, contains facing page text and translations of the Nowell Codex and the Finnsburg Fragment.
2012	Beowulf: A Translation	Meyer, Thomas	Santa Barbara, California	Punctum Books	Verse	
2013	Grinnell Beowulf: A Translation with Notes	Arner, Timothy D.; Eva Dawson; Emily Johnson; Jeanette Miller; Logan Shearer; Aniela Wendt; Kate Whitman	Grinnell, Iowa	Grinnell College Press	Verse	Illustrated translation and teaching edition.
2013	Beowulf	Purvis, Meghan	London	Penned in the Margins	Verse	A collection of connected poems, or read as one long poem. "The Collar" won The Times Stephen Spender Prize for poetry in translation, 2011 and the collection was Poetry Book Society recommended translation, Summer 2013.
2014 [1926]	Beowulf: A Translation and Commentary	Tolkien, J. R. R.	London	HarperCollins	Prose	Translated 1920–1926, edited by Christopher Tolkien, published posthumously with "Sellic Spell", a version reconstructed as an Anglo-Saxon folktale, i.e. without the heroic elements
2017	Beowulf	Mitchell, Stephen	New Haven, Connecticut	Yale University Press	Verse	
2020	Beowulf: A New Translation	Headley, Maria Dahvana	London	Macmillan	Verse	It translates the opening Hwæt as "Bro!" Won the 2021 Harold Morton Landon Translation Award and the 2021 Hugo Award for Best Related Work.
2021	'Beowulf' by All: Community Translation and Workbook	Abbott, Jean; Treharne, Elaine, and Fafinski, Mateusz (Eds.)	Leeds	Arc Humanities Press	Verse	Translated by over 200 contributors. An earlier version appeared in 2018, as Beowulf by All, Version 1.0 from Stanford TexT (of Stanford University Press).
2022	After Beowulf	Nicole Markotić	Toronto, Canada	Coach House Books	Verse	
2023	Beowulf: Translation and Commentary	Tom Shippey (trans.) and Leonard Neidorf (ed. & commentary)	London	Uppsala Books	Verse	Facing page Old English and translation.

=== Other Languages ===
Date	Title	Translator	Location	Publisher	Language	Type	Notes
1815	De Danorum rebus gestis secul. III & IV. Poema danicum dialecto anglo-saxonica. Ex bibliotheca Cottoniana Musaei britannici edidit versione lat. et indicibus auxit Grim. Johnson Thorkelin.	Thorkelin, Grímur Jónsson	Copenhagen	Th. E. Rangel	Latin	Prose	Transcription (full of errors) and first translation (considered poor)
1820	Bjowulf's Drape	Grundtvig, Nikolaj Frederik Severin	Copenhagen	A. Seidelin	Danish	Verse	First version in a modern language, "a free paraphrase in a rhyming ballad metre"
1863	Beowulf, mit ausführlichem Glossar	Heyne, Moritz	Paderborn	Ferdinand Schoningh	German		
1920	Byovulpu caritramu: vacana kavyamu	Kesava Pillai, Rayapeta	Madras	R. Purushottam & Co.	Telugu		OCLC 499929509
1932	Beowulf and the Fight at Finnsburg	Kuriyagawa, Fumio	Tokyo	Iwanami	Japanese		Parallel text with Old English. OCLC 556817509.
1951	La gesta de Beowulf	Borges, Jorge Luis; Delia Ingenieros	Mexico City	Fondo de Cultura Económica	Spanish		
1954	Beowulf	Collinder, Björn	Stockholm	Natur och Kultur	Swedish	Verse, alliterative	Illustrated by Per Engström.
1959	Beowulf: poema eroico anglosassone	Cecioni, Cesare G.	Bologna	Edizioni Giuseppe Malipiero	Italian	Prose	
1969	Beowulf	Duțescu, Dan and Levițchi, Leon	Bucharest	Editura pentru literatură universală	Romanian	Verse	First and only translation in Romanian. Using alliteration and triple meters, as they are considered closer to the heroic tradition in the target literature.
1975	Beowulf	В. Тихомиров	Moscow	Издательство «Художественная литература»	Russian	Verse	Includes translation of "Elder Edda".
1982	Beovulf: Staroengleski junački spev i odlomci iz junačkih pesama	Kovačević, Ivanka	Belgrade	Narodna knjiga	Serbian	Prose	With translations of "The Fight at Finnsburg", "Widsith", "Exodus", "The Battle of Brunanburh", "The Battle of Maldon"
1986	Beowulf: Részletek	Képes, Júlia; Weöres Sándor; András T. László	Budapest	Európa Könyvkiadó	Hungarian	Verse, alliterative	Excerpts (10 pages).
1990	Beowulf: anglosaksi eepos	Sepp, Rein	Tallinn	Eesti Raamat	Estonian	Verse	imitates original's poetic form as closely as possible, with half-lines
1992	贝奥武甫：古英语史诗	Feng, Xiang	Beijing	SDX Joint Publishing	Simplified Chinese	Verse	First translation from Old English, with Finnsburh fragment.
1996	Μπέογουλφ: Αγγλο-σαξονικό επικό ποίημα Béowoulf: Anglo-saxonikó epikó poéima	Karagiórgos, Pános	Thessaloniki	Kyriakides	Greek		Title reads "Beowulf: Anglo-Saxon epic poem".
1999	Beowulf	Pekonen, Osmo; Clive Tolley	Porvoo	WSOY	Finnish	Verse	with Finnsburh fragment. OCLC 58326940
2007	Beowulf	Ramalho, Erick	Belo Horizonte, Brazil	Tessitura Editora	Portuguese		Parallel text with Old English
2012	Беовульф	O'Lear, Olena	Lviv	Астролябія	Ukrainian	Verse	
2013	Бэўвульф	Brylʹ, Anton Frantsishak	Minsk	Зміцер Колас	Belarusian	Verse	
2017	Beovulfs	Linde, Māris	Riga	Linde	Latvian	Verse, in half-lines	Compared with Latvian folktales Lāčplēsis and Kurbads.
2019	Beowulf	Dillström, Rudolf (translator); Järvinen, Matti (editor)	Helsinki	Nysalor-kustannus	Finnish		The Finnish translation and explanations were published as serialised articles in Laivastolehti magazine in 1927, the article at the end appeared in Juttulehti magazine No. 4/1929 and the obituary appeared in Laivastolehti No. 6/1928. Only about half of the translation had been published by the time Dillström died. The translation is inspired by the Finnish national epic, the Kalevala, which he was interested in.

== Sources ==
- Magennis, Hugh (2011). Translating Beowulf: Modern Versions in English Verse. D. S. Brewer. ISBN 978-1-84384-394-8.
