= John Richard Clark Hall =

Scholar of Old English (1855–1931)

- Born: 1855; Peckham, England
- Died: 6 August 1931 (aged 75/76); Eastbourne, East Sussex, England
- Education: Gray's Inn; University of London
- Occupations: Author, barrister
- Spouse: Mary Ann Elizabeth Symes (m. 1883)
- Children: 4, including Wilfrid

John Richard Clark Hall (1855 – 6 August 1931) was a British barrister, writer, and scholar of Old English. In his professional life, Hall worked as a clerk at the Local Government Board in Whitehall. Admitted to Gray's Inn in 1881 and called to the bar in 1896, Hall became principal clerk two years later.

Hall's A Concise Anglo-Saxon Dictionary became a widely used work upon its 1894 publication, and after multiple revisions, it remains in print as of 2024. His 1901 prose translation of Beowulf—the tenth in English, known simply as "Clark Hall"—became "the standard trot to Beowulf", and was still the canonical introduction to the poem into the 1960s; several of the later editions included a prefatory essay by J. R. R. Tolkien. Hall's other work on Beowulf included a metrical translation in 1914, and the translation and collection of Knut Stjerna's Swedish papers on the poem into the 1912 work Essays on Questions Connected with the Old English Poem of Beowulf.

In the final decade of his life, Hall's writings took to a Christian theme. The Society for Promoting Christian Knowledge published two of his works at this time: Herbert Tingle, and Especially his Boyhood, a memoir to Hall's lifelong friend that highlighted his early methods of self-education, and Birth-Control and Self-Control, a pamphlet on the ethics of birth control. Hall also wrote Is Our Christianity a Failure?, a 1928 book described by The Spectator as a "layman's attempt to express and defend his religion".

== Early life ==
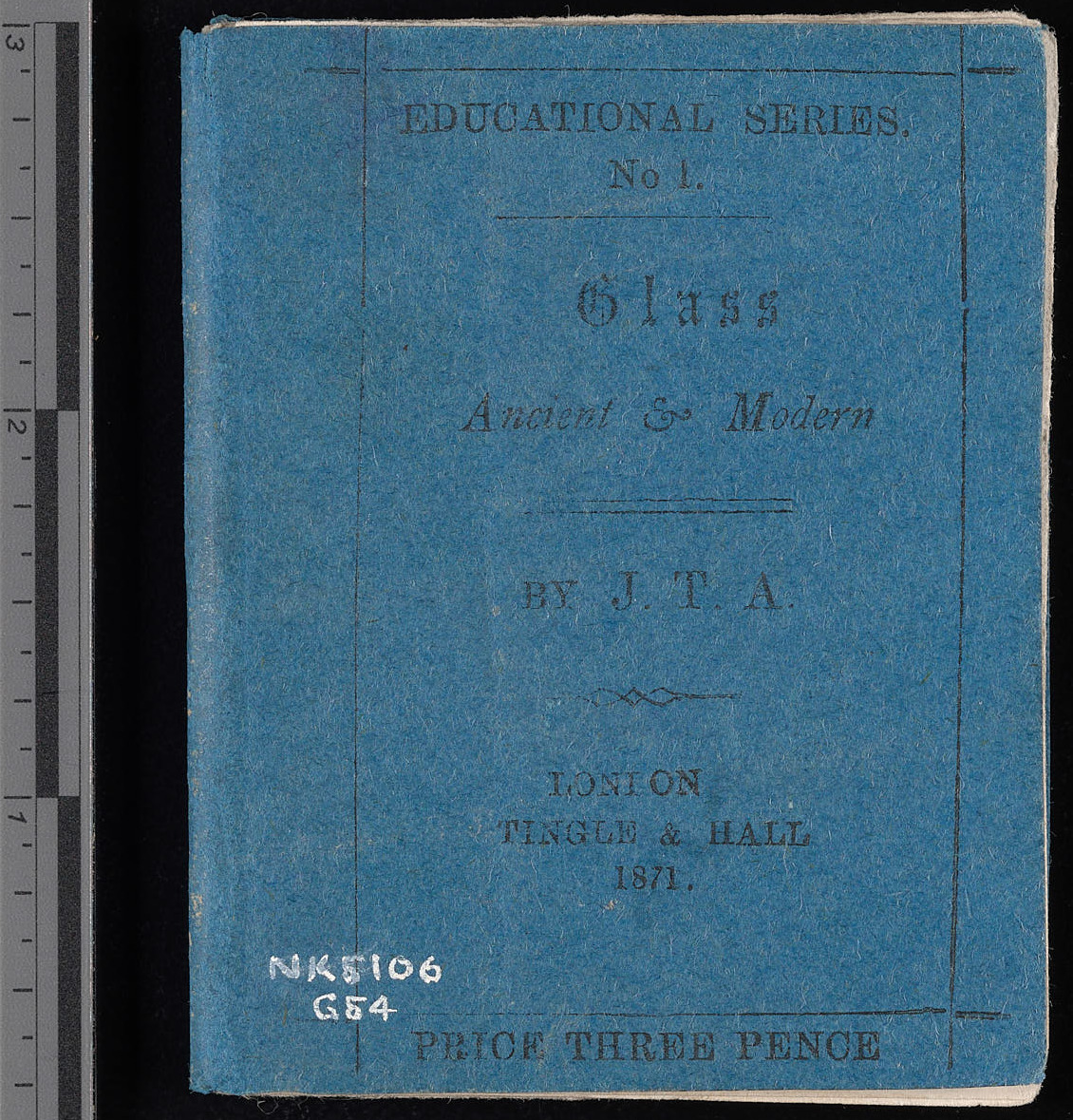
Glass: Ancient & Modern, an 1871 Tingle & Hall publication held by the Rakow Research Library at the Corning Museum of Glass

John Richard Clark Hall was born in 1855 in Peckham, outside London. He was the only son of James John Hall, the principal clerk in the Custom House, City of London. Previously, his father had worked in the Tea and East India Department of HM Customs. An uncle, Joseph Hall, lived in Golcar Hill. John Hall later described having been "brought up in an atmosphere of old-fashioned Toryism and Churchmanship".

Hall spent parts of his childhood on the outskirts of Peckham, where he met his lifelong friend Herbert Tingle. Among other amusements, Hall and Tingle devised a "brick world" from blocks, with, as Tingle wrote, "railways and parliamentary elections, obstructionists, and lectures on science, and examinations, and all the complicated apparatus of a modern country in full blast"; by 1919, Hall still possessed nearly 200 documents outlining the world's structure, including newspapers, results of general elections, postage stamps, a shipping company's lists of sailings, a theatre programme, and railway timetables. The two also obtained a toy printing press. The results were good enough that at least three pamphlets with the "Tingle & Hall" imprint were acquired by the British Library, and a fourth by the Rakow Research Library at the Corning Museum of Glass in New York. Hall himself discovered one of the former when older, and wondered much how it had reached there.

Hall had what he later termed an "education on more or less orthodox classical lines, with the inevitable examinations". He was educated at the Collegiate School in Peckham, and at St Olave's Grammar School, in Southwark. In May 1871, when aged around 16, he won the second prize for the best essay on "the duty of kindness to animals", a competition opened to students of about 120 London schools by the Royal Society for the Prevention of Cruelty to Animals. (Note: Hall later recalled his friend Tingle being "so tender even to the lowest forms of animal life that, observing that the R.S.P.C.A. seemed to have neglected that particular department, I once suggested to him that we should start a Society for the Prevention of Cruelty to Insects, with a monthly organ ('The Bugs' Friend')". Hall was placed fourth and won £25 in another essay contest in 1876, writing on the topic of "The Circulation of Corrupt Versions of Holy Scripture by a large Section of Protestant Christians" for the Trinitarian Bible Society.) By age 18 he had obtained certificates at both the Cambridge and Oxford Junior Local Examinations, along with a senior certificate from the latter, earning him the title Associate in Arts at Oxford.

In 1872 and 1873 Hall passed the Civil Service examinations, coming first out of more than 170 candidates for clerkships. Hall was placed in the Local Government Board. According to a local newspaper, he was "specially prepared" for the examination by a Mr. Braginton. On 16 May 1881, Hall was admitted to Gray's Inn. In 1889 he received a Bachelor of Arts from the University of London, and in 1891 a Master of Arts in English and French from the same school. By 1894, he had also earned a PhD. Hall was finally called to the bar in 1896, having studied both Roman law, and constitutional law and legal history. Upon the retirement of Mr. R. B. Allen in November 1898, Hall became the principal clerk in the Local Government Board.

== Writing career ==
Beginning shortly before he became a barrister, and continuing until shortly before his death, Hall wrote seven books alongside several shorter works. The first two, A Concise Anglo-Saxon Dictionary and Beowulf and the Fight at Finnsburg: A Translation into Modern English Prose, quickly became authoritative works that went through four editions each. Hall's third book, a translation of Swedish essays on Beowulf by Knut Stjerna, was similarly influential. Hall's later works were Christian-themed, including two published by the Society for Promoting Christian Knowledge.

=== A Concise Anglo-Saxon Dictionary ===
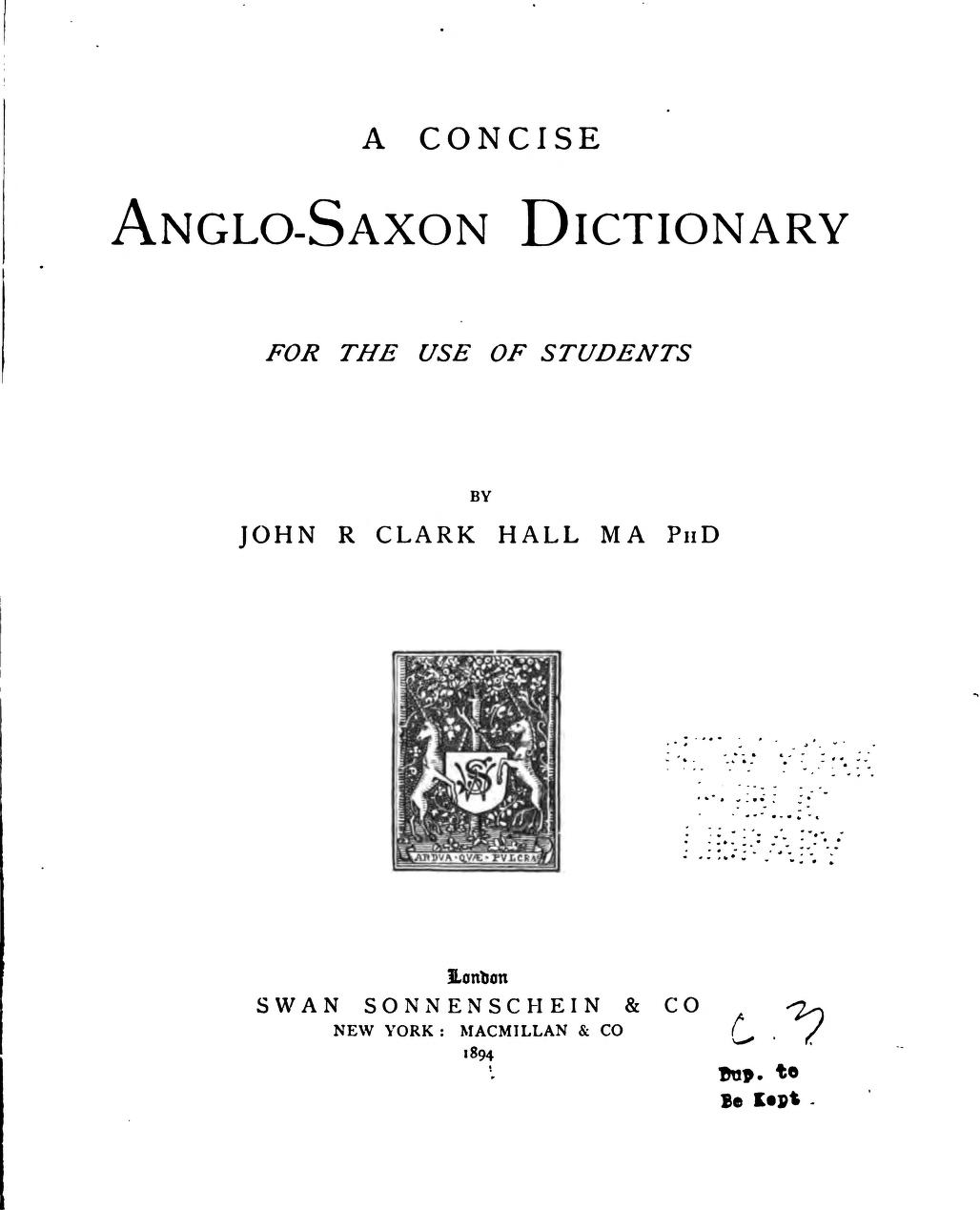
Title page of Clark Hall's 1894 A Concise Anglo-Saxon Dictionary

Hall's dictionary of Old English, subtitled For the Use of Students, quickly became a widely used work upon its publication in 1894. The work, issued four years before the final volume of An Anglo-Saxon Dictionary by Joseph Bosworth and Thomas Northcote Toller, filled the need of a complete Old English dictionary. "At last", wrote The Guardian, "we have a complete Anglo-Saxon dictionary, complete from A to the very end of the alphabet." Two years later, the publication of Henry Sweet's A Student's Dictionary of Anglo-Saxon provided a second modern compact dictionary. After Bosworth–Toller was completed in 1898, A Concise Anglo-Saxon Dictionary continued to serve prominently as an introductory, if smaller, resource; Hall, Bosworth–Toller, and Sweet were all eventually superseded by The Dictionary of Old English, issued by the University of Toronto starting in 1986.

The first edition of the dictionary attempted to ease access by ordering entries by the words as they were actually spelt in common editions of Old English texts, and critics noted that this introduced its own share of confusion. Hall eliminated this approach in a 1916 second edition, acknowledging that this "was admittedly an unscientific [approach], and opened the door to a good many errors and inconsistencies". Thenceforth he adopted the conventional method of using "normalised" entry words. Hall also began indicating words found only in poetical texts, providing the source of words recorded only once, and adding cross-references to corresponding entries in the Oxford English Dictionary, then underway. The edition was "markedly superior to the first edition" according to a reviewer for Modern Philology, and according to Frederick Klaeber, its "outward make-up is almost an ideal one". In Journal of Education, a reviewer termed it "the most modern treatment of the most ancient usage of our language".

A third and significantly expanded edition of the dictionary followed in 1931; according to Francis Peabody Magoun, it was "to all intents and purposes [a] completely new edition", and "a notable monument to the memory of its author", who died the year of publication. A fourth edition—a reprinting with a supplement by the philologist Herbert Dean Meritt—came in 1960. This was reprinted by the University of Toronto Press starting in 1984, and is still in print as of 2026.

=== Beowulf ===
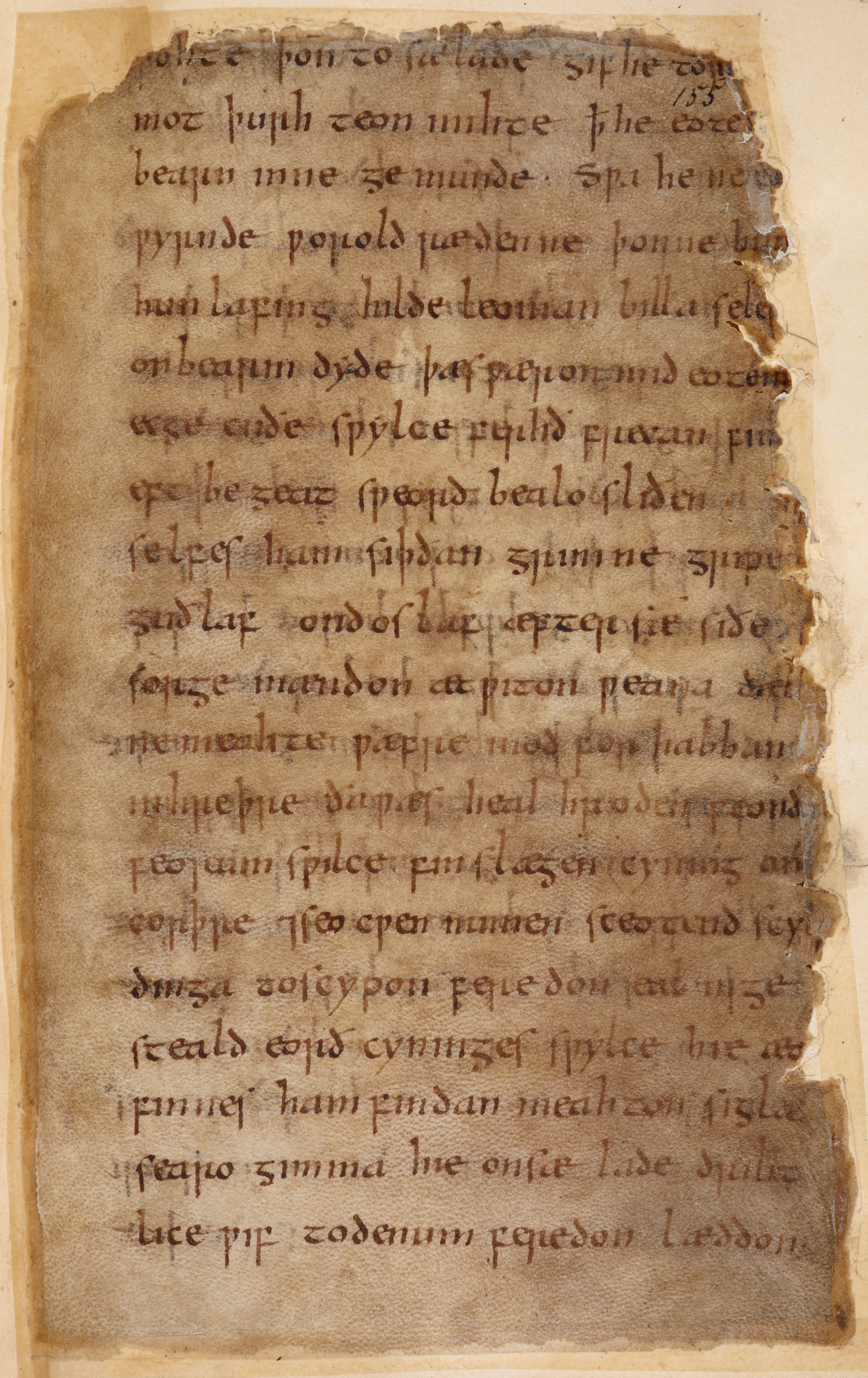
Folio 158r of the Beowulf manuscript, showing lines 1138–1158 (Note: The folio starts with the second word of line 1138, þohte, and ends with the first word of line 1158, læddon. An 1884 renumbering of the folios by the British Library means that there are two numbering paradigms, the "manuscript foliation" and the "British Library foliation". The page shown is folio 158r under the British Library foliation, and folio 155r under the manuscript foliation.)

In 1901, after publication of the first edition of his dictionary, Hall published a literal translation of Beowulf. It was the tenth English translation of the work (Note: The eighth translation, in 1892, had also been translated by a John Hall, John Lesslie Hall.) and became "the standard trot to Beowulf". It was largely praised at its outset, including by The Manchester Guardian for containing a "decidedly better" translation than any in current use, and by Chauncey Brewster Tinker for providing "a useful compendium of Beowulf material", although The Athenæum wrote that in striving to be too literal, it did not "go very far towards supplying the desideratum" of an "adequate prose version" of the poem. The first edition was followed by a corrected second in 1911. Such revision was "welcome", wrote the English philologist Allen Mawer, "for it is probably the best working translation that we have". The Athenæum, for its part, wrote that the work was "unaltered in general character", but "with considerable improvements". Posthumous third and fourth editions were edited by Charles Leslie Wrenn and published in 1940 and 1950, respectively. These contained an essay by J. R. R. Tolkien, "Prefatory Remarks on Prose Translation of 'Beowulf'", which was later restyled "On Translating Beowulf" for the compilation The Monsters and the Critics, and Other Essays. Hall's translation—known simply as "Clark Hall"—was "still the 'crib of choice' in Oxford in the 1960s", according to Marijane Osborn, an Old English scholar and Beowulf translator who compiled a list of more than 300 translations and adaptations of the poem. A 2011 survey of Beowulf translations termed it "one of the most enduringly popular of all translations of the poem".

In 1910 Hall published a note on lines 1142–1145 of the poem in Modern Language Notes, and two years later, he translated various papers by Stjerna into the work Essays on Questions Connected with the Old English Poem of Beowulf. "It is the great value of these essays", wrote Hall, "that in them Stjerna has collected all the material bearing on the poem of Beowulf which archæological research has yielded in the three Scandinavian countries up to the present time." Previously written in Swedish and published in a medley of obscure journals and Festschrifts before Stjerna's early death, Hall's translation gave them much a much broader audience—which English museum curator E. Thurlow Leeds called "a great service"—and added what Klaeber termed "the function of a conscientious and skilful editor besides". Although the chief reader would be "the Old English student", The Observer wrote, "the helmets and swords in Beowulf and the funeral obsequies of Beowulf and of Scyld ... should serve to send many readers to the poem which has been translated by Dr. Clark Hall in an excellent prose version".

Hall followed up his literal Beowulf translation with a metrical translation in 1914. Writing for The Modern Language Review, professor of English and fellow Beowulf translator W. G. Sedgefield suggested that by "attempting to make a metrical version of the Beowulf in modern English, Dr Clark Hall has undertaken one of the most difficult tasks possible for a translator, and we intend no reflection on his ability and scholarship when we say that in our opinion he has not succeeded". Noting the difficulties of translating the poem and what he termed "arbitrar[y]" choices by Hall, Sedgefield concluded that "Dr Hall would have done well not to try to improve on his excellent prose version of the poem." The metrical translation did not see a second edition, although it was republished in 2014.

Beowulf 229–234

þā of wealle geseah
weard Scildinga,
sē þe holmclifu
healdan scolde,
beran ofer bolcan
beorhte randas,
fyrdsearu fūslicu;
hine fyrwyt bræc
mōdgehygdum,
hwæt þā men wǣron.

Clark Hall's 1901 prose

Then from the rampart the watchman of the
Scyldings, who had to guard the sea-cliffs, saw them
lift bright shields and trim war-harness over the
gangway. In the thoughts of his mind he was
bursting with curiosity as to who these men were.

Clark Hall's 1914 verse

Then the Ward of the Scyldings,
who had as his office
to watch o'er the sea-cliffs,
saw men from the rampart
bear over the bulwarks
the bright-gleaming bucklers,
— well-ordered war-gear.
Much did he question
in the thoughts of his heart,
who these persons might be.

Roy Liuzza's 2013 verse

When from the wall the Scyldings' watchman,
whose duty it was to watch the sea-cliffs,
saw them bear down the gangplank bright shields,
ready battle-gear, he was bursting with curiosity
in his mind to know who these men were.

=== Christianity ===
Hall's obituary termed him a "protestant reformer", and several of his writings touched on the subject of Christianity. In 1919 and 1923, the Society for Promoting Christian Knowledge published two of his works. The former, Herbert Tingle, and Especially His Boyhood, served as a memoir to Hall's lifelong friend, who had died the year before, (Note: Hall also privately published a shorter memoir the year before, entitled Herbert Tingle 1855–1918: A Memoir.) and included an introduction by Bishop of Oxford Hubert Burge, The book was also marketed as a "book for educationists"; it described how Tingle had only one year of formal schooling but devised methods of educating himself with self-made toys and games. In the journal School, a reviewer wrote that "Herbert Tingle apparently had never heard of Froebel or Montessori ... yet his available knowledge made him a delightful companion his friend writes, and his independence of education so called would delight the soul of Henry Adams. Let all educators read this piece of Herbert Tingle's life and ponder on the essentials to be taught the young!" Writing for Journal of Education, another reviewer added that while Tingle seemed to be of no special account, and while "for the life of me I do not quite see why I read it, [but] we are glad there were two boys like Tingle and Hall and that after one of them passed on at the age of sixty-five the other has taken time to write about their boyhood days and ways."

Later works were more overtly Christian. Hall's 1923 pamphlet by the Society for Promoting Christian Knowledge, Birth-Control and Self-Control, criticised the ethics of birth control. Five years later Hall published a book titled Is Our Christianity a Failure? The Contemporary Review called it an "earnest, fair-minded book, written with judicial weight of mind", while The Spectator termed it a "layman's attempt to express and defend his religion". (Note: Two months earlier, Hall had addressed a letter to The Spectator advocating for the "parochial comprehensiveness" of the church, in which, for example, an elaborate morning Eucharist ceremony would be followed by a simple evening Eucharist, thus accommodating those of different views in both parish churches and the broader Church of England. "It is very little consolation to the laity to be told ... that the Church of England is comprehensive," Hall wrote, "if, as is too often the case, its bishops and clergy and not equally comprehensive, but use their position to promote the interests of some party within it.")

== Works ==
=== Books ===
- Hall, John Richard Clark (1894). A Concise Anglo-Saxon Dictionary (1st ed.). London: Swan Sonnenschein & Co.

—— (1916). A Concise Anglo-Saxon Dictionary (2nd ed.). New York: Macmillan.
—— (1931). A Concise Anglo-Saxon Dictionary (3rd ed.). Cambridge: Cambridge University Press.
—— & Meritt, Herbert Dean (1960). A Concise Anglo-Saxon Dictionary (4th ed.). Cambridge: Cambridge University Press.
—— & Meritt, Herbert Dean (1984). A Concise Anglo-Saxon Dictionary. Medieval Academy reprints for teaching. Vol. 14 (4th ed.). Toronto: University of Toronto Press. ISBN 0-8020-6548-1.

- Hall, John Richard Clark (1901). Beowulf and the Fight at Finnsburg: A Translation into Modern English Prose (1st ed.). London: Swan Sonnenschein & Co.

—— (1911). Beowulf and the Finnsburg Fragment: A Translation into Modern English Prose (2nd ed.). London: Swan Sonnenschein & Co.
—— (1940). Wrenn, Charles Leslie (ed.). Beowulf and the Finnesburg fragment: A Translation into Modern English Prose (3rd ed.). London: George Allen & Unwin.
—— (1950). Wrenn, Charles Leslie (ed.). Beowulf and the Finnesburg fragment: A Translation into Modern English Prose (4th ed.). London: George Allen & Unwin.

- Stjerna, Knut (1912). Essays on Questions Connected with the Old English Poem of Beowulf. Extra Series. Vol. III. Translated by Hall, John Richard Clark. London: Viking Club: Society for Northern Research.
- Hall, John Richard Clark (1914). Beowulf: A Metrical Translation into Modern English. Cambridge: Cambridge University Press.

- Republished in 2014 as Hall, John Richard Clark (2014). Beowulf: A Metrical Translation into Modern English. Cambridge: Cambridge University Press. ISBN 978-1-107-44812-4.

- Hall, John Richard Clark (1919a). Herbert Tingle, and Especially His Boyhood. London: Society for Promoting Christian Knowledge.
- Hall, John Richard Clark (1923). Birth-Control and Self-Control. London: Society for Promoting Christian Knowledge.
- Hall, John Richard Clark (1928a). Is Our Christianity a Failure?. London: Marshal Bros. OCLC 559807324.

=== Articles ===
- Hall, John Richard Clark (1898). "On the Effect and Tendency of Recent Sanitary Legislation". In Edwards, Richard Fielding (ed.). Provisional Papers of the Corps of Royal Engineers. Royal Engineers Institute Occasional Papers. Vol. XXIV. Chatham: Royal Engineers Institute, Chatham. pp. 139–157.
- Hall, John Richard Clark (April 1910). "A Note on Beowulf 1142–1145". Modern Language Notes. 25 (4). The Johns Hopkins University Press: 113–114. doi:10.2307/2915967. JSTOR 2915967.

=== Other ===
- Hall, John Richard Clark (1918). Herbert Tingle 1855-1918: A Memoir. London: Privately printed. OCLC 753101812.
- Hall, John Richard Clark (22 August 1919b). "The Transport Question". The Times. No. 42, 185. London. p. 6 – via Newspapers.com.
- Hall, John Richard Clark (25 April 1925). "An Old Broadside". Notes and Queries. CXLVIII (17): 297. doi:10.1093/nq/CXLVIII.apr25.297a. ISSN 0029-3970.
- Hall, John Richard Clark (17 November 1928b). "The Comprehensiveness of the Church". The Spectator. 141 (5, 238): 736.

=== Tingle & Hall ===
- A., J. T. (1871). Glass: Ancient and Modern. London: Tingle & Hall. OCLC 315569274.
- Hall, John Richard Clark (1872). From Beverley to Whitby: A Narrative of a Day in East Yorkshire. London: Tingle & Hall. OCLC 559807284.
- Finn, Arthur Henry (1873). Jephthah: A Soliloquy. London: Tingle & Hall. OCLC 560616960.
- Essays by Amateur Maniacs. London: Tingle & Hall. 1874. OCLC 560708585.

== Personal life ==
Hall married Mary Ann Elizabeth Symes, of Kingston Russell, Dorset, on 29 November 1883; the ceremony was held in the adjacent village Long Bredy, with the rector Henry Pigou presiding. The two had four children, three of whom survived: Cecil Symes (born 20 September 1886), Irene Clark (born c. 1886), and the entomologist Wilfrid John (born 13 December 1892).

Hall was a member of the Yorkshire Philosophical Society, joining in 1910. Having spent time in Peckham as a child, he disparaged the "straphanger", or weekday commuter, which he blamed with divesting the suburb of its "mild air of suburban gentility" and turning it into "weekly property". Hall was in Switzerland during the outbreak of the First World War, and unable to move or communicate with friends for more than a fortnight. In 1925 he wrote to Notes and Queries to ascertain the origin of "an old broadside ... purporting to be 'A True Copy of a Letter written by Jesus Christ'" and to be "a charm against evil spirits, miscarriage, etc.", which Hall said had been passed down by Yorkshire ancestors, and "looks like the kind of thing a pedlar might try to sell to ignorant folks". Among those who answered, Robert Priebsch identified it as "a late—though by no means the latest—offshoot of an interesting fiction ... which, in my opinion, originated in Southern Gaul or Northern Spain towards the close of the sixth century, and which has enjoyed a tremendous spread all over Europe".

Hall died on 6 August 1931, at a nursing home in Eastbourne, East Sussex, aged 75 or 76. His obituary noted that he had formerly been on the Local Government Board in Whitehall, and that he had left a £16,762 estate (equivalent to £987,225 in 2025).

== Bibliography ==
- Ackerman, Robert W. (1970). "Herbert Dean Meritt: A Biographical Sketch". In Rosier, James L. (ed.). Philological Essays: Studies in Old and Middle English Language and Literature in Honour of Herbert Dean Meritt. The Hague: Mouton. pp. 11–12. doi:10.1515/9783110820263-002. ISBN 9783110820263. LCCN 74-102958.
- "New Members Elected, 1910". Annual Report of the Council of the Yorkshire Philosophical Society for MCMX. York: Yorkshire Philosophical Society. 1911. p. xxvii.
- Atherton, Mark (2014). "Dictionaries, Modern". In Lapidge, Michael; Blair, John; Keynes, Simon & Scragg, Donald (eds.). The Wiley Blackwell Encyclopedia of Anglo-Saxon England (2nd ed.). Chichester, West Sussex: Wiley Blackwell. p. 145. doi:10.1002/9781118316061.ch4. ISBN 978-0-470-65632-7.
- "Basic Christianity". The Contemporary Review. CXXXIV: 392–393. September 1928.
- "Book Notes" (PDF). The Servant of India. VI (49). Poona: 580. 3 January 1924.
- Burdett, Henry, ed. (1920). "Private Nursing Homes and Agencies: Provincial, Scotch and Irish". Burdett's Hospitals and Charities. Vol. 31. London: The Scientific Press. pp. 1025–1028.
- "Calls to the Bar". The Standard. No. 22, 585. London. 18 November 1896. p. 4 – via Newspapers.com.
- "Calls to the Bar". The Law Times. CII (2799). Horace Cox: 70. 21 November 1896.
- The Cambridge Yearbook and Directory. London: Swan Sonnenschein & Co. 1906.
- Campbell, Alistair (November 1962). "Review of A Concise Anglo-Saxon Dictionary". The Review of English Studies. New Series. XIII (52). Oxford University Press: 436. JSTOR 513700.
- Chase, Frank H. (February 1895). "Review of A Concise Anglo-Saxon Dictionary". Modern Language Notes. X (2): 50–52. JSTOR 2919215.
- Chermayeff, Serge (June 1962). "Review of A Concise Anglo-Saxon Dictionary". Scientific American. 206 (6): 198. JSTOR 24936595.
- Chickering, Howell D. Jr. (Autumn 1967). "Donaldson's Beowulf: The Critical Art of Translation". The Massachusetts Review. VIII (4): 774–779. JSTOR 25087669.
- "Civil Service Appointment". Local and District News. The Huddersfield Daily Chronicle. No. 1, 885. Huddersfield. 22 August 1873. p. 2.
- "Civil Service Appointment". District Intelligence: Golcar. The Huddersfield Chronicle. No. 1, 886. Huddersfield. 23 August 1873. p. 2.
- "Civil Service Commission". From the London Gazette of Yesterday. The Morning Post. No. 31, 544. London. 6 August 1873. p. 6 – via Newspapers.com.
- "Civil Service Commission, April 22, 1873". The London Gazette. No. 23969. London. 22 April 1873. p. 2044.
- "Civil Service Commission, Sept. 30". From the London Gazette of Yesterday. The Morning Post. No. 30, 832. London. 2 October 1872. p. 5 – via Newspapers.com.
- "A Concise Anglo-Saxon Dictionary". University of Toronto Press.
- "The Council of Legal Education". The Times. No. 34, 785. London. 13 January 1896. p. 10 – via Newspapers.com.
- Dickins, Bruce (1911–1912). "Review of Essays on Questions Connected with the Old English Poem of Beowulf". Year Book of the Viking Society for Northern Research. IV. London: Viking Society for Northern Research: 36–37.
- "Essays on Beowulf". Books of the Day. The Observer. Vol. 121, no. 6, 327. London. 25 August 1912. p. 3 – via Newspapers.com.
- Foster, Joseph (1889). The Register of Admissions to Gray's Inn, 1521–1889, Together with the Register of Marriages in Gray's Inn Chapel, 1695–1754. London: Privately printed. p. 491.
- Gardiner, Robert Barlow, ed. (1906). "Capitation Scholars: Admitted January, 1900". The Admission Registers of St. Paul's School from 1876 to 1905. London: George Bell and Sons. pp. 395–398.
- Garnett, James M. (1898). "Anglo-Saxon Dictionaries". The American Journal of Philology. XIX (75). Johns Hopkins University Press: 323–328. doi:10.2307/287977. JSTOR 287977.
- "Hall, Dr Wilfrid John". Who Was Who. Oxford University Press. 1 December 2007. doi:10.1093/ww/9780199540884.013.U54350. ISBN 978-0-19-954089-1.
- Hausmann, Franz Josef; Reichmann, Oskar; Weigand, Herbert Ernst; Zgusta, Ladislav, eds. (1990). "John R. Clark Hall and Herbert Dean Meritt". Dictionaries: An International Encyclopedia of Lexicography. Vol. 2. New York: Walter de Gruyter. p. 1443. ISBN 3-11-012420-3.
- Hawkes, Arthur John (9 May 1925). "An Old Broadside". Notes and Queries. CXLVIII (19): 340. doi:10.1093/nq/CXLVIII.may09.340b. ISSN 0029-3970.
- "John Richard Clarke Hall in the Dorset, England, Church of England Marriages and Banns, 1813–1921". Ancestry Library. 2011.
- "John Richard C Hall in the 1891 England Census". Ancestry Library. 2005.
- "John Richard Clark Hall in the 1911 England Census". Ancestry Library. 2011.
- "John Richard Clark Hall in the England & Wales, National Probate Calendar (Index of Wills and Administrations), 1858–1995". Ancestry Library. 2010.
- Johnson, W. Guy (1920). "A Remarkable Boyhood: Review of Herbert Tingle, and Especially His Boyhood" (PDF). The Churchman. XXXIV: 32.
- Kiernan, Kevin, ed. (2016). "Prefixed Leaves". Electronic Beowulf. University of Kentucky.
- Klaeber, Frederick (January 1914). "Review of Essays on Questions Connected with the Old English Poem of Beowulf". The Journal of English and Germanic Philology. XIII (1). University of Illinois: 167–173. JSTOR 27700570.
- Klaeber, Frederick (January 1918). "Review of A Concise Anglo-Saxon Dictionary". The Journal of English and Germanic Philology. XVII (1). University of Illinois: 153–155. JSTOR 27700862.
- Knott, Thomas A. (May 1917). "Review of A Concise Anglo-Saxon Dictionary". Modern Philology. XV (1). University of Chicago Press: 64. doi:10.1086/387114. JSTOR 432960.
- Leeds, E. Thurlow (January 1913). "Review of Essays on Questions Connected with the Old English Poem of Beowulf". The English Historical Review. XXVIII (109): 148–151. doi:10.1093/ehr/XXVIII.CIX.148. JSTOR 550896.
- "Authors' and Journalists' Directory". The Literary Who's Who for the Year 1920. York: George Routledge and Sons. 1920. pp. 25 v.
- Liuzza, Roy M. (2013). Beowulf: Facing Page Translation. Peterborough, Ontario: Broadview Press. ISBN 978-1-55481-113-7.
- "London, Nov. 16: B.A. Examination, 1889 Pass List". University Intelligence. The Times. No. 32, 859. London. 18 November 1889. p. 10 – via Newspapers.com.
- "London, Dec. 10: B.A. Examination, 1889 Pass List". University Intelligence. The Times. No. 32, 879. London. 11 December 1889. p. 6 – via Newspapers.com.
- Magennis, Hugh (2011). Translating Beowulf: Modern Versions in English Verse. Woodbridge: D. S. Brewer. ISBN 978-1-84384-261-3. JSTOR 10.7722/j.ctt81pnv.
- Magoun, Francis Peabody (April 1932). "Review of A Bibliographical Guide to Old English, The Anglo-Saxon Poetic Records: A Collective Edition, and A Concise Anglo-Saxon Dictionary". Speculum. VII (2). The Mediaeval Academy of America: 286–289. doi:10.2307/2850769. JSTOR 2850769.
- "Marriages". Births, Marriages, and Deaths. The Western Gazette. No. 7, 687. Yeovil. 7 December 1883. p. 1.
- Mawer, Allen (October 1911). "Review of Beowulf and the Finnsburg Fragment". The Modern Language Review. VI (4). Modern Humanities Research Association: 542. doi:10.2307/3713299. JSTOR 3713299.
- "Mr. R. B. Allen". The Devon and Exeter Gazette. Vol. CXXVI, no. 16, 239. Exeter. 29 November 1898. p. 7.
- Muinzer, Louis A. (October 1963). "Review of A Concise Anglo-Saxon Dictionary". Journal of English and Germanic Philology. LXII (4): 786–787. JSTOR 27727182.
- Osborn, Marijane (November 1997). "Translations, Versions, Illustrations". In Bjork, Robert E. & Niles, John D. (eds.). A Beowulf Handbook. Lincoln: University of Nebraska Press. pp. 341–359. ISBN 0-8032-1237-2.
- Osborn, Marijane (2014). "Annotated List of Beowulf Translations: The List". The Arizona Center for Medieval & Renaissance Studies. Archived from the original on 21 November 2014.
- "New S.P.C.K. Books". The Manchester Guardian. No. 22, 873. London. 1 December 1919. p. 7 – via Newspapers.com.
- "Oxford Local Examinations". The Standard. No. 14, 682. London. 22 August 1871. p. 2.
- "Oxford Local Examinations". The Standard. No. 14, 998. London. 24 August 1872. p. 3.
- P., A. S. (December 1928). "Review of Is Our Christianity a Failure?". The King's Business. 19 (12): 768–769.
- Priebsch, Robert (11 July 1925). "An Old Broadside". Notes and Queries. CXLIX: 30–31. doi:10.1093/nq/CXLIX.jul11.30b. ISSN 0029-3970.
- "Prof. W. J. Sedgefield". Obituary. The Manchester Guardian. No. 30, 756. London. 2 May 1945. p. 6 – via Newspapers.com.
- "Protestant Reformer: John Richard Clark Hall". Wills and Estates. The Scotsman. No. 27, 596. Edinburgh. 7 November 1931. p. 14.
- "Recent Wills". The Manchester Guardian. No. 26, 576. Manchester. 9 November 1931. p. 16 – via Newspapers.com.
- "Review of A Concise Anglo-Saxon Dictionary". The Journal of Education: A Monthly Record and Review (304): 637. 1 November 1894.
- "Review of A Concise Anglo-Saxon Dictionary". Journal of Education. XLI (12): 203. 21 March 1895. JSTOR 44041430.
- "Review of A Concise Anglo-Saxon Dictionary". The Guardian. No. 2, 578. London. 1 May 1895. p. 657 – via Newspapers.com.
- "Review of A Concise Anglo-Saxon Dictionary". Journal of Education. LXXXIV (11): 301. 28 September 1916. JSTOR 42807712.
- "Review of Beowulf and the Fight at Finnsburg". Books of the Week. The Manchester Guardian. No. 17, 103. Manchester. 4 June 1901. p. 4 – via Newspapers.com.
- "Review of Beowulf and the Fight at Finnsburg". Notes and Queries. Ninth Series. VII (181): 479. 15 June 1901. ISSN 0029-3970.
- "Review of Beowulf and the Fight at Finnsburg". The Athenæum (3846): 56. 13 July 1901.
- "Review of Beowulf and the Finnsburg Fragment". The Athenæum (4351): 303. 18 March 1911.
- "Review of Herbert Tingle, and Especially His Boyhood". Journal of Education. XCI (6): 162. 5 February 1920. JSTOR 42805454.
- "Review of Herbert Tingle, and Especially His Boyhood". The Contemporary Review. CXVII: 605. April 1920.
- Fuller, Henry Starkey (8 April 1920). "Review of Herbert Tingle, and Especially His Boyhood". School. XXXI (32): 317.
- "Review of Is Our Christianity a Failure?". The Spectator. 142 (5, 247): 94. 19 January 1929.
- "The Schoolmasters Yearbook and Directory". Alphabetical Lists of Secondary Schoolmasters and Schools. II. London: Swan Sonnenschein & Co. 1908.
- The Schoolmasters Yearbook and Directory. Vol. II. London: The Year Book Press. 1912.
- Sedgefield, Walter John (July 1915). "Review of Beowulf: A Metrical Translation into Modern English". The Modern Language Review. X (3). Modern Humanities Research Association: 387–389. doi:10.2307/3712638. JSTOR 3712638.
- Tinker, Chauncey B. (1902). "Review of Beowulf and the Fight at Finnsburg". The Journal of Germanic Philology. IV (3): 379–381. JSTOR 27699184.
- "Trinitarian Bible Society". The Belfast News Letter. Vol. CXL, no. 19, 107. Belfast. 21 October 1876. p. 3.
- "University of London, July 14: M.A. Examination, Pass List". University Intelligence. The Times. No. 33, 377. London. 15 July 1891. p. 5 – via Newspapers.com.
- Windle, Bertram C. A. (June 1912). "Review of Beowulf and the Fight at Finnsburg". Folk-lore. XXIII (2). The Folk-lore Society: 252. JSTOR 1255333.
- Windle, Bertram C. A. (July 1913). "Review of Essays on Questions Connected with the Old English Poem of Beowulf". Folk-lore. XXIV (2). The Folk-lore Society: 252–254. doi:10.1080/0015587X.1913.9719569. JSTOR 1255514.
