= Wilfrid Hall =

British entomologist

Wilfrid John Hall CMG MC (13 December 1892 – 13 January 1965) was a British entomologist. The son of John Richard Clark Hall, he was director of the Commonwealth Institute of Entomology 1946–1958, and president of the Royal Entomological Society 1955–1956.
