= USS John L. Hall =

1981 Oliver Hazard Perry-class frigate

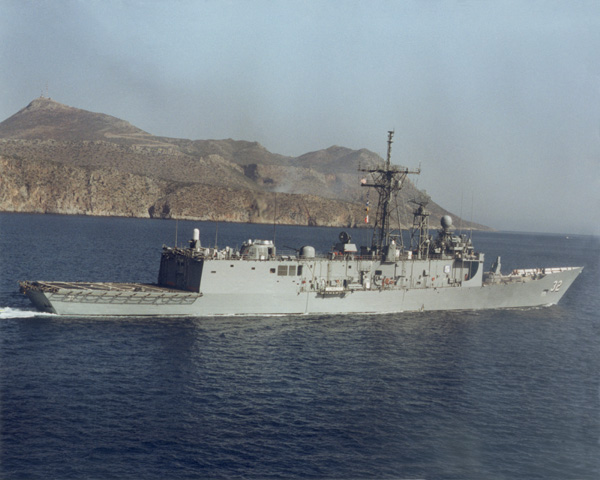
- USS John L. Hall (FFG-32)

History

United States
- Name: John L. Hall
- Namesake: Admiral John L. Hall, Jr.
- Awarded: 23 January 1978
- Builder: Bath Iron Works, Bath, Maine
- Laid down: 5 January 1981
- Launched: 24 July 1981
- Sponsored by: Dr. Susan Hall Godson (niece and biographer of Admiral Hall)
- Commissioned: 26 June 1982
- Decommissioned: 9 March 2012
- Identification: Hull symbol:FFG-32; Code letters:NJLH
- Motto: Semper Victores; (Always Victorious)
- Nickname(s): "The Johnny"
- Status: Undergoing scrapping
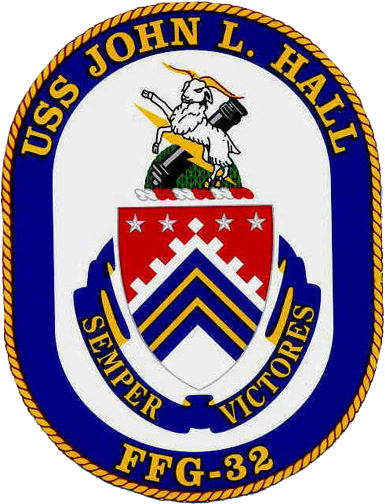
- Badge

General characteristics
- Class & type: Oliver Hazard Perry-class frigate
- Displacement: 4,100 long tons (4,200 t), full load
- Length: 453 feet (138 m), overall
- Beam: 45 feet (14 m)
- Draft: 22 feet (6.7 m)
- Propulsion: 2 × General Electric LM2500-30 gas turbines generating 41,000 shp (31 MW) through a single shaft and variable pitch propeller; 2 × Auxiliary Propulsion Units, 350 hp (260 kW) retractable electric azimuth thrusters for maneuvering and docking.
- Speed: over 29 knots (54 km/h)
- Range: 5,000 nautical miles at 18 knots (9,300 km at 33 km/h)
- Complement: 15 officers and 190 enlisted, plus SH-60 LAMPS detachment of roughly six officer pilots and 15 enlisted maintainers
- Sensors & processing systems: AN/SPS-49 air-search radar; AN/SPS-55 surface-search radar; CAS and STIR fire-control radar; AN/SQS-56 sonar.
- Electronic warfare & decoys: AN/SLQ-32
- Armament: As built: 1 × OTO Melara Mk 75 76 mm/62 caliber naval gun; 2 × Mk 32 triple-tube (324 mm) launchers for Mark 46 torpedoes; 1 × Vulcan Phalanx CIWS; 4 × .50-cal (12.7 mm) machine guns.; 1 × Mk 13 Mod 4 single-arm launcher for Harpoon anti-ship missiles and SM-1MR Standard anti-ship/air missiles (40 round magazine); Note: As of 2004, Mk 13 systems removed from all active US vessels of this class.
- Aircraft carried: 2 × SH-60 LAMPS III helicopters

USS John L. Hall (FFG-32), twenty-sixth ship of the Oliver Hazard Perry class of guided-missile frigates, was named for Admiral John L. Hall, Jr. (1891–1978). Her mission is to provide in-depth protection for military and merchant shipping, amphibious task forces, and underway replenishment groups.

Ordered from Bath Iron Works, Bath, Maine, on 23 January 1978 as part of the FY78 program, John L. Hall was laid down on 5 January 1981, launched on 24 July 1981, and commissioned on 26 June 1982.

On 20 June 1989, John L. Hall got underway with USS Spruance for a transit of the Atlantic Ocean to participate in Anti-Submarine Warfare Operations (Operation ROJO) in the north and east Atlantic Ocean. Operation ROJO lasted 41 days. While underway, the ships were under the command of Destroyer Squadron 32. Both ships held contact on two Soviet submarines for an extended period of time.

On 8 March 1990, John L. Hall deployed to the Mediterranean Sea. Noteworthy operations included Operation Fox Chase and Operation World Cup in which the ship successfully tracked a Soviet Victor I-class submarine for extended periods of time on both occasions. On 7 August 1990, during deployment Med 2-90 and serving with the Eisenhower Battle Group as part of the United States Sixth Fleet, USS John L. Hall, under the command of Commander Bruce P. McClure, sortied from Haifa Bay for Port Said. With Iraq's invasion of Kuwait, John L. Hall was called to transit the Suez Canal along with USS Ticonderoga, USS Scott, USNS Neosho, USS Suribachi and USS Dwight D. Eisenhower in support of Operation Desert Shield. John L. Hall's participation included "gate guard" duties to support the United Nations sanctions against Iraq and anti-air coverage for U.S. Navy assets. The ship also escorted USNS Neosho through the Straits of Bab-el-Mandeb to Djibouti for her shore bunkering before returning through the Strait to refuel the Eisenhower Battle Group in the Red Sea. During the deployment, USS John L. Hall held over 200 hours of contact time with submerged submarines using the SQR 19 towed array sonar, and over 800 hours of flight time with the LAMPS MK III SH-60B helicopter detachment from HSL-46.

On 28 August 2005, under the command of Commander David Geisler, she sailed from her home port, NS Pascagoula, Mississippi, along with sister ship Stephen W. Groves under threat from Hurricane Katrina.

In 2007, she remained active, commanded by Commander Augustus P. Bennet, assigned to Destroyer Squadron 14, and homeported at Naval Station Mayport. In August 2008, while underway to avoid Tropical Storm Fay, the scheduled change of command occurred with Commander Derek Lavan assuming command of the vessel.

21 April 2010, the John L. Hall was seen docked in Sevastopol (UA).

On 22 June 2010, then CO Commander Herman Pfaeffle was relieved of command after striking a pier on 16 April 2010 in Batumi in the republic of Georgia

On 9 March 2012, the John L. Hall was decommissioned at Naval Station Mayport and moved to the Naval Inactive Ship Maintenance Facility in Philadelphia, Pennsylvania, where it was laid up. It was subsequently sold to International Shipbreaking Ltd. of Brownsville, Texas and departed under tow to the scrappers on 6 December 2022, arriving on 19 December 2022.
