= John L. Hall Jr. =

United States Navy admiral

John Lesslie Hall Jr.
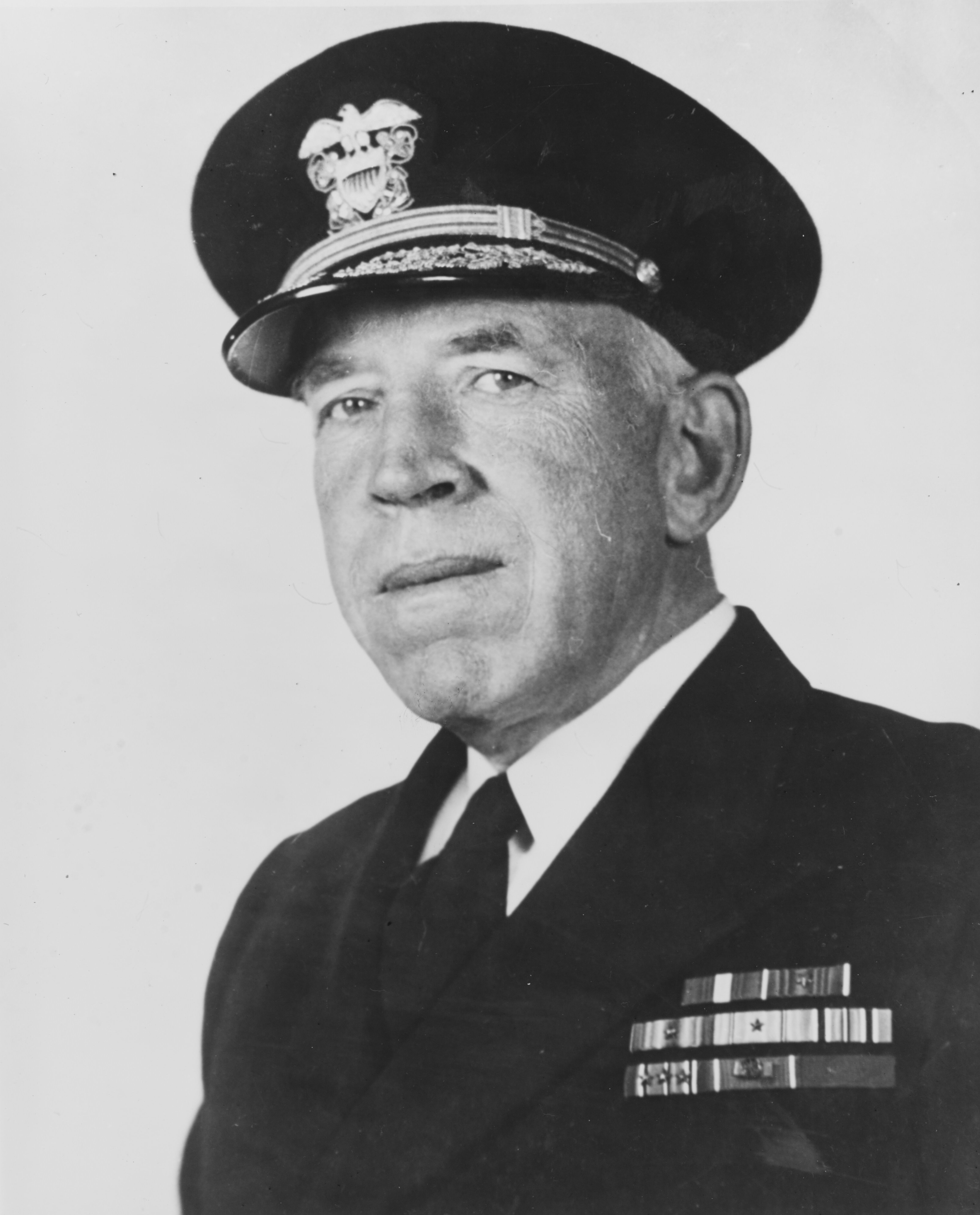
- Born: April 11, 1891; Williamsburg, Virginia, U.S.
- Died: March 6, 1978 (aged 86); Scottsdale, Arizona, U.S.
- Relatives: John Lesslie Hall (father)
- Military career
- Allegiance: United States
- Branch: United States Navy
- Service years: 1913–1953
- Rank: Admiral
- Nickname: "Viking of Assault"
- Commands: USS Childs; USS Asheville; USS Arkansas; Northwest African Sea Frontier; Amphibious Force, North African Waters; 11th Amphibious Force; Task Force 55; Amphibious Force, Pacific Fleet; Western Sea Frontier; Pacific Reserve Fleet; Armed Forces Staff College
- Conflicts: World War I World War II: North Africa; Sicily; Salerno; Normandy; Okinawa
- Awards: Navy Distinguished Service Medal (2); Army Distinguished Service Medal; Legion of Merit (2)

Admiral John Lesslie Hall Jr. (11 April 1891 – 6 March 1978) was a senior officer of the United States Navy, who served during World War II.

== Biography ==
=== Education ===
Hall, son of the literary scholar John Lesslie Hall, was born in Williamsburg, Virginia, and attended The College of William & Mary for three years before transferring to the U.S. Naval Academy where he graduated in 1913. He starred in American football for three seasons at William and Mary and four years at the Naval Academy. He excelled in three sports at the Academy and was awarded the coveted "Academy Sword" for athletic excellence.

=== World War II ===
Hall was the chief of staff of the Western Naval Task Force during the North African landings in 1942, receiving the Distinguished Service Medal for opening ports and preventing sabotage while commander of Northwest African Sea Frontier.

In February 1943, he became commander of Amphibious Force, North African Waters (Eighth Fleet), expertly cross-training army artillerymen and navy gunners so that his ships' call-fire missions could be conducted in direct support of troop advances rather than at "targets of opportunity." His concept proved devastating to enemy forces and tank divisions as he led one of the major assault forces engaged in the Sicilian Occupation (9–12 July 1943) and the bitterly contested landings at Salerno (9–21 September 1943).

These bold achievements brought him two awards of the Legion of Merit. In November 1943, he took command of the 11th Amphibious Force in the United Kingdom, earning the Army's Distinguished Service Medal for his leadership of amphibious Force "O" which landed and effectively supported the Army V Corps on the Omaha Beach sector off the coast of Normandy in June 1944. He received a second Navy Distinguished Service Medal for command of the Southern Attack Force (Task Force 55) during the Okinawa campaign. In October 1945, he became commander of Amphibious Force, United States Pacific Fleet, receiving the rank of vice admiral a few months later.

=== Postwar ===
After the war he was commandant of the Fourteenth Naval District and, in 1948, commandant of the Armed Forces Staff College at Norfolk, Virginia. From August 1951 until his retirement in May 1953, he was commander of Western Sea Frontier, with additional duty as commander of Pacific Reserve Fleet. On leaving active duty, he was advanced to the rank of full admiral on the basis of his combat awards.

General of the Army Dwight Eisenhower, the Allied Supreme Commander of all Allied forces on the Western Front during World War II, gave Hall the nickname "Viking of Assault". General George Patton, who was often a tough critic of fellow military leaders, heaped high praise on him.

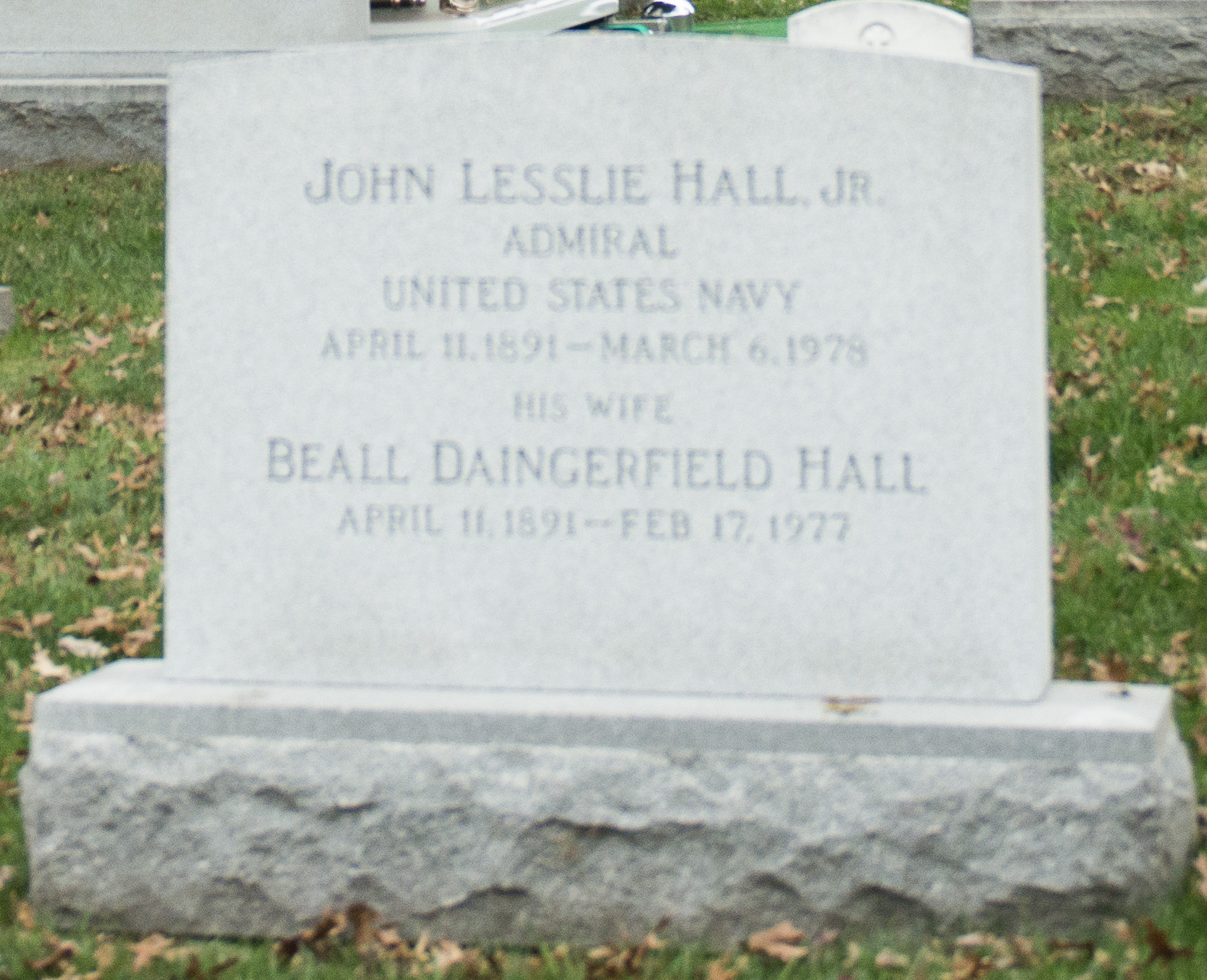
John Lesslie Hall Jr. gravestone in Arlington National Cemetery in 2015

Admiral Hall died on 6 March 1978 at the age of 86. The papers of Admiral Hall can be found in the Special Collections Research Center at the College of William & Mary.

== Namesakes ==
The guided-missile frigate USS John L. Hall (FFG-32) (launched 1981) was named in his honor.

Military offices
Preceded by Delos C. Emmons	Commandant of the Armed Forces Staff College; 1948–1951	Succeeded by Andrew D. Bruce
