= Moritz Heyne =

German linguist (1837–1906)

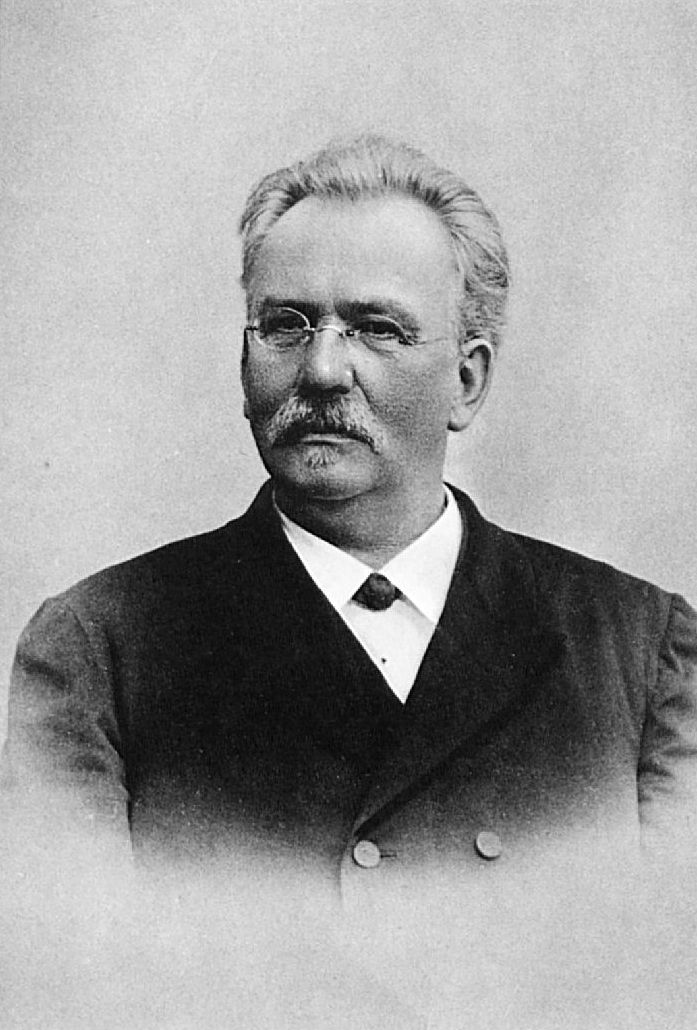
Moritz Heyne

Moritz Heyne (8 June 1837 in Weißenfels – 1 March 1906 in Göttingen) was a German Germanic linguist (Germanist).

He taught as a professor at the University of Halle (1869-1870), University of Basel (1870-), University of Göttingen (1883-).

He worked with Jakob Grimm to edit his dictionary after 1867.

He published a 3-volume work titled 'Ancient Objects of the German Domestic Home' starting in 1899, which was a pioneering work in material cultural studies.

== Literary works ==
- Laut- und Flexionslehre der altgermanischen Dialekte, 1862
- Deutsches Wörterbuch, 3 vols., 1890-1895

=== Editions ===
- Beowulf: Angelsächsisches Heldengedicht, 1863
- Heliand, 1866
- Ruodlieb, 1897
