= John Lesslie Hall =

American historian and literary scholar (1856–1928)

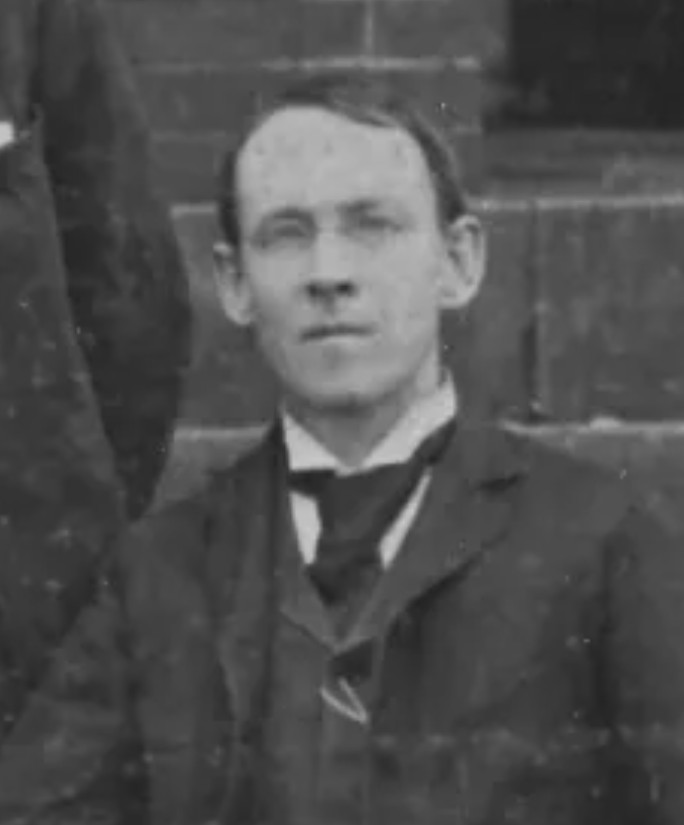
- John Lesslie Hall c. 1892
- Born: March 2, 1856; Richmond, Virginia, United States
- Died: February 23, 1928 (aged 71); Williamsburg, Virginia, United States

Academic background
- Education: Randolph-Macon College (BA); Johns Hopkins University (PhD)
- Thesis: Beowulf, an Anglo-Saxon Epic Poem (1892)

Academic work
- Discipline: Philology, Old English literature
- Institutions: College of William & Mary

John Lesslie Hall (March 2, 1856 – February 23, 1928), also known as J. Lesslie Hall, was an American philologist and translator known primarily for his 1892 verse translation of Beowulf and role as one of the "Seven Wise Men" who helped revive the College of William & Mary after its closure in the early 1880s. He spent nearly forty years on the faculty of William & Mary, serving as professor of English and History, head of the English department and dean of the faculty.

Hall was awarded an honorary degree from William & Mary in 1921. Today, his portrait hangs in the Botetourt Gallery in the college's Swem Library.

== Early life and education ==
Hall was born on March 2, 1856, in Richmond, Virginia, the son of Jacob Hall Jr. and great-grandson of Richard Channing Moore, the second bishop of the Episcopal Diocese of Virginia. As a child, he experienced the Siege of Richmond during the American Civil War and would tell his son the he recalled encounters with Robert E. Lee.

Hall received his undergraduate education at Randolph–Macon College in Ashland, Virginia. After graduating, he taught school before beginning graduate study at Johns Hopkins University, where he earned his doctorate in 1892. His doctoral dissertation was published simultaneously as his translation of Beowulf by D. C. Heath and Company of Boston. In the preface for his translation, he thanked famed philologist Francis March and Anglo-Saxon poetry professor James A. Harrison for "advice, sympathy, and assistance."

== Career ==
=== College of William & Mary ===
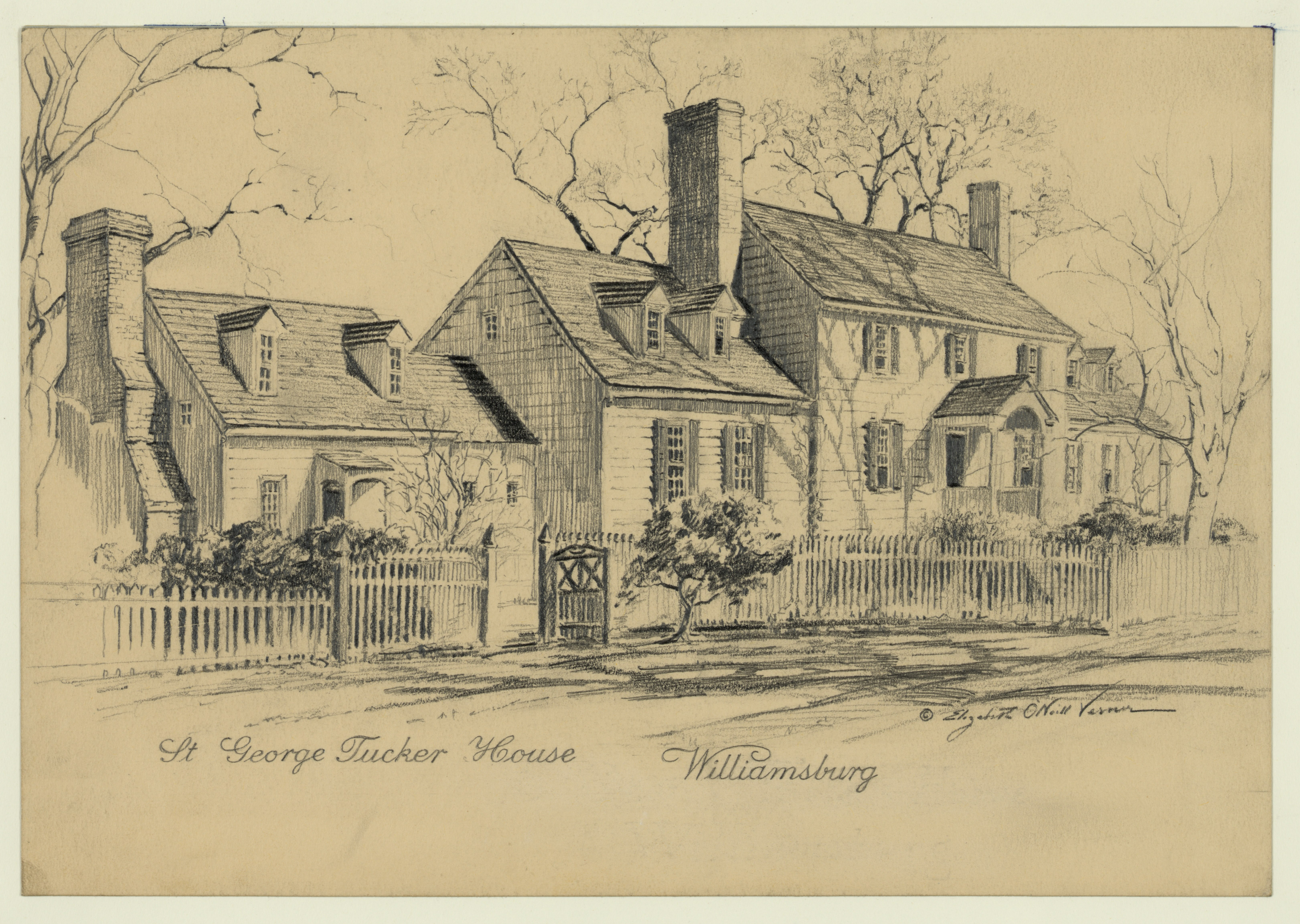
St. George Tucker House, Hall's initial residence in Williamsburg

In 1888, Hall was recruited by newly appointed college president Lyon Gardiner Tyler to join the reopened College of William & Mary as professor of English and History, a position he accepted while still a doctoral candidate at Johns Hopkins. He and his family relocated to Williamsburg, initially renting the St. George Tucker House. Hall was one of the seven professors known collectively to students as the "Seven Wise Men"—the others were Tyler, Hugh S. Bird, Charles E. Bishop, Van F. Garrett, Thomas Jefferson Stubbs, and Lyman B. Wharton—who are credited with reviving the William & Mary after its closure in 1881.

When the college curriculum was reorganized in 1898, Hall shifted to teaching English Language and Literature and General History. He served as Dean of the Faculty from 1905 to 1920 and again from 1922 to 1928, during which time he managed disciplinary matters and served as acting president in Tyler's absence. He continued to teach at William & Mary until his death in 1928. Hall was known as an exacting teacher who required students to produce monthly essays of publishable quality, and for instilling in them an appreciation for the English language through engaging lectures.

== Research and scholarship ==
=== Anglo-Saxon Verse ===
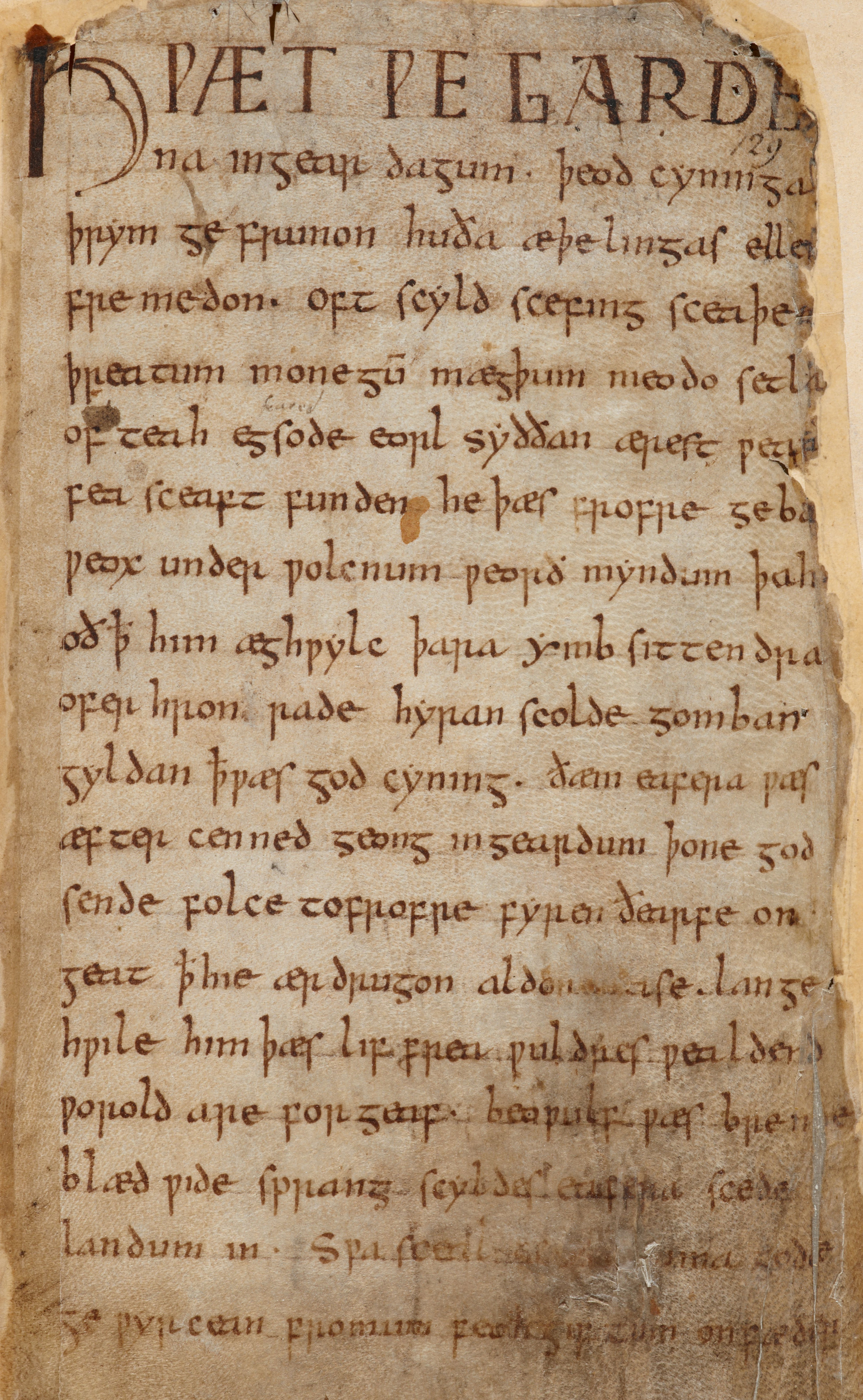
The first folio of Beowulf

Hall's 1892 translation Beowulf: An Anglo-Saxon Epic Poem (D. C. Heath) closely followed the Heyne-Socin edition of the Old English text, employing alliterative verse and archaic diction—including the pronouns "thee" and "thou"—to approximate the half-line rhythmic structure of the original. Hall described his aim as reproducing "approximately, in modern measures, the venerable epic." The translation was noted in Chauncey Brewster Tinker's The Translations of Beowulf: A Critical Bibliography (1903), which described it as faithful in style yet not strictly literal, with a deliberate archaic tone:

Grendel reaches Heorot: Beowulf 710–714
Old English verse

Ðá cóm of móre under misthleoþum
Grendel gongan· godes yrre bær·
mynte se mánscaða manna cynnes
sumne besyrwan in sele þám héan·

Hall's verse

’Neath the cloudy cliffs came from the moor then
Grendel going, God’s anger bare he.
The monster intended some one of earthmen
In the hall-building grand to entrap and make way with;

As the product of an American academic and presented as a Johns Hopkins doctoral dissertation, it contributed to the growing engagement with Anglo-Saxon literature in United States higher education. Hall also co-authored an Anglo-Saxon grammar and contributed original poetry written in the style of Old English verse.

=== Virginia History and Civic Life ===
Hall's contributions to Virginia history and civic life are less well remembered but formed a meaningful part of his public identity during his lifetime. His advocacy for Jamestown as a site of democratic origins—comparing the Great Charter of 1618 and the 1619 assembly to Magna Carta—aligned him with a tradition of Virginia historical romanticism that was intellectually fashionable in the late nineteenth and early twentieth centuries, and his participation in preservation-oriented circles placed him among contemporaries who were reshaping how Americans thought about their colonial past.

== Personal life ==
In 1889, Hall married Margaret Fenwick Farland, of Tappahannock, Virginia. They had four children: three sons—Channing Moore, John Lesslie Jr., and Joseph Farland—and one daughter, Sarah Moore. Hall and his wife "steadily drilled their sons and daughter, enabling them all to skip grades and enter William and Mary at age 14."

His son John Lesslie Hall Jr. became a Vice Admiral in the United States Navy and served with distinction in World War II. His son Channing Moore Hall pursued law at the University of Virginia and served as a Williamsburg attorney and mayor. Joseph Farland Hall studied law at Washington and Lee University and the University of Michigan. The Hall family's multigenerational association with William & Mary and Williamsburg—stretching from Hall's 1888 arrival through the civic careers of his grandchildren and great-grandchildren—represents an unusual instance of an academic family becoming durably woven into a community's institutional fabric. His son John L. Hall Jr. rose to the rank of Vice Admiral in the United States Navy, In 2010, Hall's great-grandsons Channing Moore Hall III and John Lesslie Hall III received William & Mary's Prentis Award for civic service to the Williamsburg community.

== Death and legacy ==
Hall died on February 23, 1928, at his home in Williamsburg, Virginia. He was buried in Hollywood Cemetery in Richmond.

Hall's 1892 Beowulf translation was among the first serious American verse translations of the poem, and its inclusion in Chauncey Brewster Tinker's 1903 The Translations of Beowulf confirmed its standing as a work that scholars of the period were obliged to reckon with. Hall was explicit about his ambitions: he aspired for Beowulf to achieve among English-speaking readers the familiarity of the Iliad, and he believed the poem's martial grandeur demanded verse rather than the prose renderings that had preceded him. Later criticism has generally focused on this choice. Compared to translations that followed in the twentieth century, including Seamus Heaney's widely acclaimed 1999 version, Hall's rendering is typically described as wooden, its archaisms creating distance rather than intimacy, and its alliterative regularity at times flattening the dramatic tension of the original narrative. Yet for scholars interested in the history of translation, Hall's version remains useful precisely for its literalism and structural fidelity, and it continues to circulate freely as a public-domain text through Project Gutenberg and LibriVox, and is the version used by Standard Ebooks.

For William & Mary, Hall's significance cannot be overstated. As one of the "Seven Wise Men," he helped transform an underfunded institution on the edge of closure into a functioning liberal arts college, and his long service as Dean of the Faculty gave him an administrative influence over the university's institutional culture that few of his contemporaries matched.

== Selected works ==
- (tr.) Beowulf: An Anglo-Saxon Epic Poem (D. C. Heath, 1892)
- Judas: A Drama in Five Acts (H. T. Jones, 1894)
- (tr.) Judith, Phœnix, and Other Anglo-Saxon Poems (Silver, Burdett and Company, 1902)
- Old English Idyls (Ginn & Company, 1899), original poems in the style of Old English verse
- Half-hours in Southern History (B. F. Johnson Publishing Co., 1907)
- English Usage: Studies in the History and Uses of English Words and Phrases (Scott, Foresman and Company, 1917)
