= Charles Leslie Wrenn =

British Anglo-Saxonist (1895–1969)

- Born: 30 December 1895; Westcliff-on-Sea, Essex
- Died: 31 May 1969 (aged 73)
- Occupation: Scholar
- Title: Rawlinson and Bosworth Professor of Anglo-Saxon
- Board member of: Fellow of Pembroke College, Oxford

Academic background
- Education: The Queen's College, Oxford

Academic work
- Institutions: University of Durham 1917-20; University of Madras 1920-21; University of Dhaka 1921-28; University of Leeds 1928-1930; University of Oxford 1930-39; King's College London 1939-45; Pembroke College, Oxford 1945-63

Charles Leslie Wrenn (30 December 1895 – 31 May 1969) was an English scholar and writer, the Rawlinson and Bosworth Professor of Anglo-Saxon between 1945 and 1963, and the founder and chairman of the International Association of University Professors of English. Wrenn was also the President of the Philological Society from 1944 to 1948.

== Early life ==
Born in Westcliff-on-Sea, Charles Wrenn was privately educated, before he was elected to a scholarship at The Queen's College, Oxford, where he achieved First class honours in English.

== Career ==
Wrenn joined the University of Durham in 1917, where he worked for three years lecturing English, before becoming Principal and Professor of English at Pachaiyappa's College at the University of Madras, before leaving in 1921 to spend seven years at the newly formed University of Dhaka as Professor of English. Wrenn returned to the UK, working as a lecturer in the department of English Language and Literature at the University of Leeds between 1928 and 1930. He returned to Oxford at Queens College in 1930 as a lecturer in English Language, a position he held until 1939, leaving to become Professor of English Language and Literature at King's College London. While at Oxford, he assisted J.R.R. Tolkien in teaching Anglo-Saxon at Pembroke College. During his time at King's, Wrenn served as Dean of the faculty of Arts and was chairman of council of its school in Slavonic studies. In 1933, Wrenn delivered a paper on Standard Old English to the Philological Society which was seen as a major corrective to Henry Sweet's idea that West Saxon was standardised.

Wrenn returned to Oxford in 1945 becoming the Rawlinson and Bosworth Professor of Anglo-Saxon, the successor in the chair to J.R.R. Tolkien who had become the Merton Professor of English Language and Literature. He also became the chairman of the board of faculty of English, and an O'Donnell lecturer in Celtic studies. In 1949, Wrenn wrote,

English is now on the way to becoming a world-language: and this means many types of English, many pronunciations and vocabulary-groups within the English language. There is, for instance, an Indian – and even Bengali form of English [...] Language is a social activity: and whether it is really desirable for English or any other language – real or invented – to become a world-medium, is a question which perhaps concerns the anthropologist and other students of the "social sciences" rather than student of the English Language.

In 1954, Wrenn was appointed vicegerent to act as Master in the absence of Frederick Homes Dudden, becoming the first Professor Fellow to hold a college office. Wrenn visited the Soviet Union in the early 1950s as a representative of British linguistic studies. He held the position of Professor until 1963, when he was made Professor Emeritus and continued to teach at Pembroke until his death. Wrenn was the founder of the International Association of University Professors of English, organising its first conference at Magdalen College, Oxford in 1950 and serving as its first chairman from 1950 until 1953. He was also President of the Philological Society between 1944 and 1948, later becoming vice-president, and chairman of the Council of Slavonic Studies between 1945-1949. Wrenn also served as a director of the British Council's Summer School for Advanced Foreign Teachers of English. Wrenn also worked as a visiting professor at Universities in the United States.

Wrenn was a Fellow of Pembroke College, Oxford, a position he first received with the seat of Rawlinson and Bosworth Professor of Anglo-Saxon, and then upon his retirement made an honorary fellow. He was also a member of the Inklings, an Oxford literary discussion group which included C. S. Lewis and Tolkien, and which met for nearly two decades between the early 1930s and late 1949. His literary interests were primarily comparative literature and later poets including T. S. Eliot.

== Selected Writings ==
Some of the work published by Wrenn include:

- The English Language (1949)
- Bewolf, edition of (1953)
- An Old English Grammar, written with Randolph Quirk (1955, rev. 1957)
- A Preface to Chaucer (1963)
- A Study of Old English Literature (1967)
