= Marijane Osborn =

American academic (born 1934)

Professor Emerita Marijane Osborn
- Occupations: Academic, writer, researcher, and early ecocritic, with a specialism in medieval literature and culture

Academic background
- Education: Stanford University

Academic work
- Discipline: Medieval Studies, Old English literature
- Institutions: UC Davis

Marijane Osborn (born 1934) is an American academic. Her research spans literary disciplines; she is a specialist in Old English and Norse literature and is known as an early pioneer of ecocriticism. Osborn has published on runes, Middle English, Victorian and contemporary poets and writers, and film, and is a translator and fiction writer. She is Professor Emerita at UC Davis.

== Academic career ==
Professor Osborn's holds a BA from the University of California, Berkeley, class of 1962. She holds an MA and PhD from Stanford University, completing her postgraduate study as the first supervisee of Fred C Robinson in 1969. She has held a teaching position at UC Davis since 1981, retiring to Emerita status in 2007. Osborn has also taught or held fellowships at the Universities of Oxford, Syracuse, Columbia, Lancaster, Edinburgh, Queen's Belfast, Alaska, Hawaii, Iceland, and UC Davis.

== Research ==
Osborn held a research Fellowship at The Institute for Advanced Studies in the Humanities, University of Edinburgh in 1973, during which time she researched Old English poetry and developed her interest in 'place study'. Osborn went on to hold a Fulbright Fellowship to Iceland, 1978–79 and 1983–84. Arising from this work in Scotland and Iceland, Osborn and her collaborator, Gillian Overing, pioneered the application of place study to early medieval literary studies in their book Landscape of Desire (1994), which was dismissed or ignored by some scholars at the time, but is now recognised as pioneering ecocriticsm.

Osborn is well known for her work on medieval work in translation, especially the Old English poem Beowulf. Osborn's translation of Beowulf, published as a Verse Translation with Treasures of the Ancient North (1983), brought together material culture from across northern Europe to 'help us visualise the world of the poem'. In 2003, the Arizona Center for Medieval and Renaissance Studies published Marijane Osborn's annotated list of over 300 translations and adaptations.

Osborn also has specialism in texts and mythologies from across the medieval north Atlantic, including the legendary Scandinavian figure Amleth.

A festschrift, Translating the Past, containing essays on Old English, Middle English, and Renaissance literature in their original and translated contexts, was published in honour of Osborn in 2012.

== Selected publications ==
=== Non fiction ===
Beowulf, A Likeness, (1990) a collaboration with designer Randolph Swearer and poet Raymond Oliver ISBN 978-0-300-04876-6

Landscape of Desire: Partial Stories of the Medieval Scandinavian World, (1994), written with Gillian Overing ISBN 978-0-8166-2375-4

The Twilight Mystique: Critical Essays on the Novels and Films, (2010), a collection of essays on the Twilight franchise, edited with Amy M. Clarke and Donald E. Palumbo ISBN 0-7864-6204-3

=== Translations and creative versions of medieval literature ===
Beowulf, a Verse Translation with Treasures of the Ancient North (1983), ISBN 0-7837-4677-6

'The Fates of Women (from four Anglo-Saxon poems)', in New Readings on Women in Old English Literature, ed. by Helen Damico and Alexandra Hennessey Olsen, pp. xi-xiii.

Grendel's Mother Broods Over Her Feral Son (2006), published in the Old English Newsletter.

Nine Medieval Romances of Magic (2010), ISBN 978-1-55111-997-7

Thirty Viking Haikus (2015) published in Stand magazine.

=== Poetry Translations ===
"Sunstone", translation of a major long poem by Octavio Paz, Hyperion 13, 177–188.

=== Fiction ===
The Woods of Leith, forthcoming children's book.
