= Julius Petersen (literary scholar) =

German philologist, Germanist and literary historian (1878–1941)

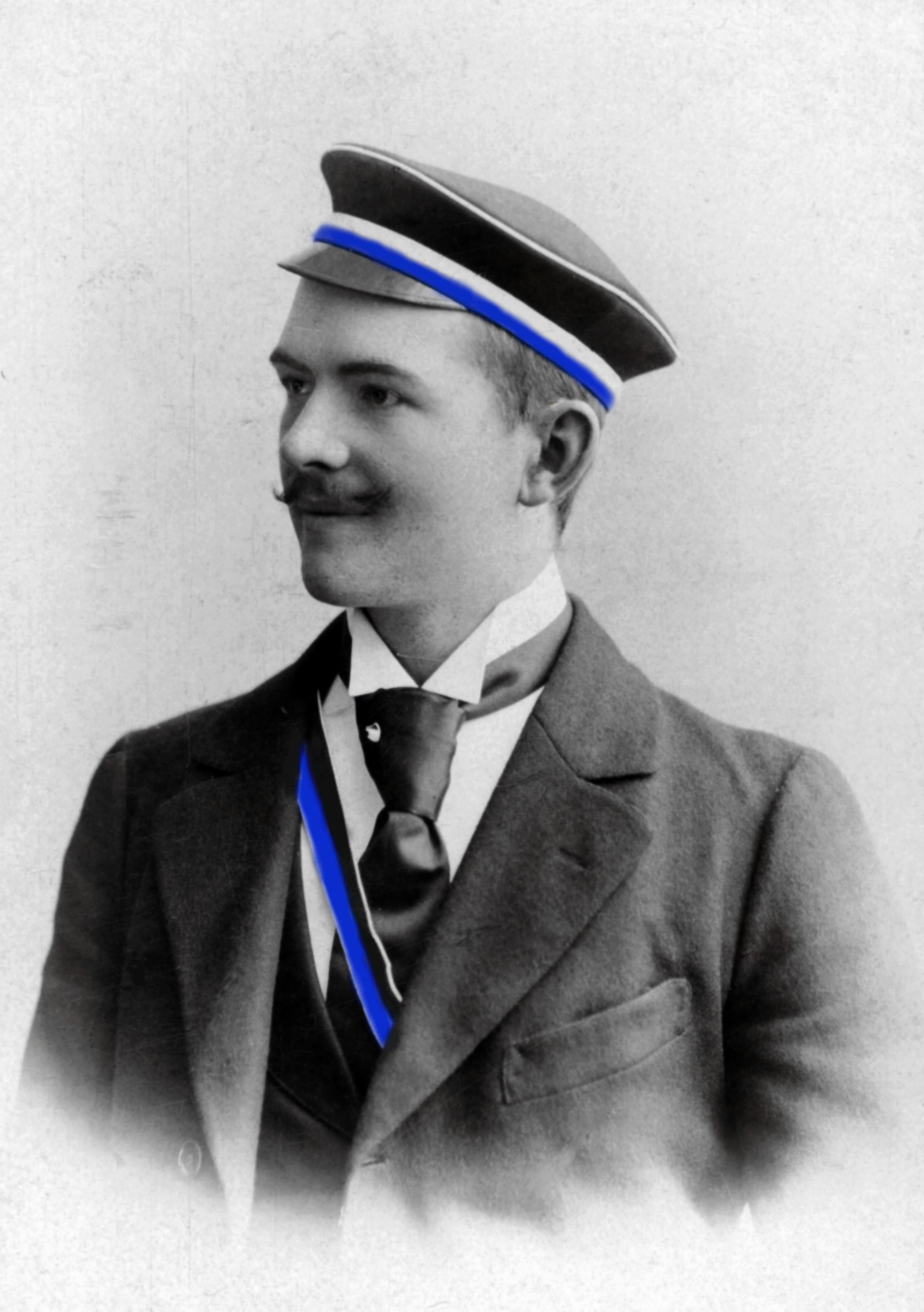
- 1898
- Born: 5 November 1878; Strasbourg, Alsace–Lorraine, German Empire
- Died: 22 August 1941 (aged 62); Murnau am Staffelsee, Gau Munich-Upper Bavaria, Free State of Bavaria, Nazi Germany
- Education: University of Lausanne; Ludwig-Maximilians-Universität München; Leipzig University; Friedrich Wilhelm University of Berlin
- Occupations: Professor of German Literature (Friedrich Wilhelm University of Berlin, Goethe University Frankfurt, Yale University, University of Basel)
- Spouse(s): 1. Anna Maria Barbara Ortmayer; 2. Ella Schmidt (born Dornbach)
- Parents: Julius Petersen (1835-1909) (father); Mathilde Trapp (mother)

Julius Petersen
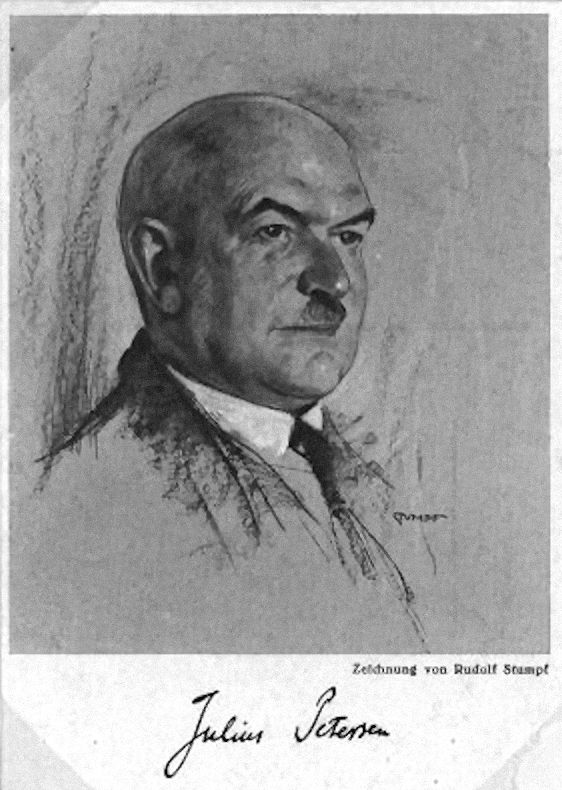
- ca. 1925

Julius Petersen (5 November 1878 - 22 August 1941) was a German literary scholar and university professor, principally at the Friedrich Wilhelm University (as it was known before 1949) in Berlin. He did much to rediscover the works of Theodor Fontane for twentieth century readers. Petersen himself has been described as one of the most influential academics in the field of German studies during the interwar period, but after 1945 he disappeared from university reading lists. During the 1960s interest in his life and works resurfaced, though it has frequently been on account of evident contradictions in his attitude to National Socialism during the final decade of his own life that he has attracted the interest of more recent commentators.

== Life ==
=== Provenance and early years ===
Julius Petersen was born in Strasbourg, which at that time was the main city in a recently annexed and still semi-detached province of Germany. His father, another Julius Petersen (1835-1909), was a senior lawyer and judge from Landau (Pfalz) who, in addition, served between October 1881 and April 1883 as a member of the German Reichstag (parliament). The younger Julius Petersen attended secondary school at the "Nikolaischule", far away to the east in Leipzig, to where the family had evidently relocated in connection with his father's judicial appointment to the I. Strafsenat" (loosely, "first criminal bench") at the German High Court.

=== Student years and post graduate teaching posts ===
He moved on to his university-level education in 1897, studying German philology, art history and philosophy at the University of Lausanne, the Ludwig-Maximilians-Universität München, Leipzig University, and the Friedrich Wilhelm University of Berlin. In 1898, he was accepted into membership of the Corps Suevia student fraternity in Munich, though there are indications that almost at once he switched from Munich to Leipzig and was classified by the Munich fraternity as an inactive member, with only very restricted involvement in corps activities. Among Petersen's more illustrious university teachers were Albert Köster at Leipzig University, followed by Wilhelm Dilthey, Heinrich Wölfflin and Erich Schmidt at the Friedrich Wilhelm University of Berlin. It was Schmidt who supervised him in Berlin for his doctorate, which he received in 1903 in return for a piece of work concerning "Schiller and the stage". That was followed by three years spent working in Stuttgart with the Cotta’sche Verlagsbuchhandlung publishing house. During 1906/07 he edited the academic supplement of the respected Allgemeine Zeitung (newspaper), which was, by this time, being produced in Munich. He received his habilitation (post-doctoral degree) from the Ludwig-Maximilians-Universität München in 1909, opening the way for a lifelong career in the university sector. His topic, on this occasion, was "Chivalry in the Works of Johannes Rothe". The work, subsequently adapted and published as a book, was supervised by the neogrammarian philologist Hermann Paul.

For the next two years, Petersen worked as a "Privatdozent" (tutor). In 1911 he accepted an associate professorship, which came with a lectureship in Modern German Philology and Theatre Studies at the Friedrich Wilhelm University of Berlin. In 1912, he switched, moving to Yale University at New Haven, Connecticut where, during 1912/13, he taught as a visiting professor. In North America he was also able to deepen his friendship with Kuno Francke at nearby Harvard University, a long established professor of German Culture and History, who is reported to have greatly respected Petersen's academic abilities. His next move, during the second half of 1912 or in 1913, was to the University of Basel.

=== Frankfurt ===
He transferred again in 1914, this time to the newly opening "Goethe University" at Frankfurt am Main, as an ordinary [i.e. full and permanent] Professor of Modern German Language and Literature. Both university archives and Petersen's own surviving papers are frustratingly short of information on his time at Frankfurt, much of which coincided with the First World War. He seems to have started teaching at the university during 1914, but university records indicate that he was "officially employed" by the university only between 1915 and 1921. Sources are not wholly consistent over timelines. After (probably) three terms of teaching he was called away for military service. There is no indication that he was ever sent to the front line, but in 1915 he was informed that he would be undertaking "garrison duties" for a year. The university managed to have his deployment deferred. It appears that arrangements were implemented, at least initially, for him to undertake his garrison duties with a regiment stationed close to the university, indicating that efforts were made to enable him to undertake his two sets of responsibilities in parallel. As late as February 1916 his personnel file includes a letter from the dean of faculty to the military authorities stressing Petersen's indispensability: "Contrary to our expectations, the number of German Studies students is so large that - as in the case of Classical Philology - that for both disciplines we should be able to provide lectures and student work programmes to the fullest extent possible". Nevertheless, military obligations evidently took Petersen away from the university, at least for the winter term of 1916/17. It appears that in his absence his courses were not taught. During 1917 and most of 1918 he was again away, undertaking war duties in his military role as a "junior officer".

=== Berlin ===
In his 1914 inaugural lecture at Goethe University Frankfurt, which carried the barely translatable title "Literaturgeschichte als Wissenschaft" (loosely, "Literary History as an academic study"), Petersen sought to draw together the teaching philosophies and philologies of his recent tutors, in particular Wilhelm Scherer, Erich Schmidt and Wilhelm Dilthey. By setting out his own teaching programme in this way, Petersen invited his audience to infer an intention and ability to mediate a synthesis between philology and the history of thought, and thereby between traditionalists and modernists. Six years later, with the political and social context transformed by war and revolution, this earned him an invitation to fill the professorial teaching chair in the History of Modern German Literature at the Friedrich Wilhelm University of Berlin formerly occupied by his old tutor, Erich Schmidt. He took up the appointment at the start of the 1920/21 term. After a six-year hiatus during which the position had been unfilled, Petersen's arrival represented a new beginning: described by one commentator as "a lively and innovative presence at the university", he broke with tradition by inviting writers to the university in order that they might meet with the students. He even insisted that the writers who came received "a decent honorarium" for their trouble. Julius Petersen taught at Berlin for the rest of his life .

In 1923, Petersen became co-director of the university Theatre Studies Institute, founded that year at his instigation. He alternated directorial duties with Max Herrmann until 1933. In April 1933, Herrmann was forced into retirement. Petersen became sole director of the section, while Herrmann was later deported with his wife to the Theresienstadt Concentration Camp, where he died in November 1942. Max Herrmann was Jewish.

During his professorship at Berlin of more than twenty years' duration, Julius Petersen undertook several major overseas lecture tours, at least some of which were undertaken in his capacity as president, between 1926 and 1938, of the Goethe Society. These included visits to Portugal in 1927, the United States and Mexico in 1933, and to England and Estonia in 1935.

A particularly important project in which Petersen engaged involved sorting, archiving, and "academic evaluation" of the extensive literary estate of Theodor Fontane. In this way he made a lasting contribution to Fontane philology. Many of the students who emerged from his Fontane and "Baroque" seminars subsequently became notable literary scholars in their own right. These included Richard Alewyn, Charlotte Jolles, Wolfgang Kayser, Fritz Martini and Erich Trunz. His advocacy of compromise in the so-called philological "methodology dispute" of the 1920a may not have been conceptually innovative, but through the various assignments he undertook and the various editions he oversaw of the works of icons of German literature such as Lessing, Goethe, Jean Paul and Schiller, Petersen did become the most prominent and perhaps influential of the nation's "new Germanisticists".

=== National Socialism ===
Petersen was much criticised, especially after 1945, for the way in which he used his influence as a popular and respected professor of the Friedrich Wilhelm University of Berlin to pull the mainstream study of Germanistics into line with dogmas of National Socialism which were at best bizarre or offensive, and some of which proved desperately dangerous after their noisiest exponents took power in 1933. In 1934 he became the producer-editor of Euphorion, a long established literary journal which now changed its title to Dichtung und Volkstum and adopted a starkly nationalistic tone. In 1934 he contributed an article which subsequently became infamous under the title "Die Sehnsucht nach dem Dritten Reich in deutscher Sage und Dichtung" ("The Yearning for the Third Reich in German sagas and ballads"). The article includes the observation that "belief in the God-given mission of a benevolent saviour and leader becomes a religious certainty". Discussion of whether or not Petersen was a "true believer" can quickly become binary. It seems likely that he became a member of the government backed "Nationalsozialistischer Deutscher Dozentenbund" (loosely, "National Socialist Lecturers League") if only in order to retain his job at the university, but there is no indication that he ever joined the party itself. There are plenty of other statements that he came up with that would have made it very easy for the Hitlerites to believe that he was one of their own. On 27 August 1935 Petersen delivered his presidential address to the Goethe Society on the occasion of its fiftieth anniversary. He took the opportunity to stress his assessment that Goethe's sense of patriotism corresponded not to quiet contemplation but to "active self-determination to stay true to oneself, self-assertion and the constant striving for self-improvement", and thereby to the "ideology of the Third Reich". During an overseas trip he went on record with the statement that Goethe would have cheered Germany's brown shirted men of power just as he had cheered the Lützow volunteers who fought against the Napoleonic military occupation in 1813/14. By 1945 Petersen was dead, and there was plenty of printed evidence of his stated opinions to ensure that no one came forward at that time to defend his political judgements.

But by the 1960s, a new generation was coming to the fore: Cold War imperatives had generated a new set of targets for political hatred, and the taboo on discussing the Hitler period in public became a little less absolute. More recently, arguments have surfaced that it was precisely because of his known intellectual support for the Hitler regime that, in respect of his personal situation, Petersen felt able to take significant risks on a human level. After 1933 it became clear that antisemitism was no mere toxic mantra for street politicians but a core underpinning of government belief. Many Jews escaped abroad. Others, unable to afford to escape or unwilling to accept that the Nazis believed their own propaganda, stayed in Germany and were, in vast numbers, murdered at the direction of the government a few years later. Petersen continued to employ Jewish assistants at the university in defiance of government diktats and where possible protected them. The case most often cited in respect of Petersen's personal actions is that of Eduard Berend who, with Petersen's support, managed to remain in Germany till 1938, and then to escape successfully to America via Switzerland. Later, when Petersen's involvement in the case of Berend became known to colleagues, his fellow (rival) literary scholar, Franz Koch, demanded in writing that Petersen should be removed by authorities of the Friedrich Wilhelm University of Berlin, because he was not acting in accordance with the interests of "the movement". Petersen successfully defended his position, insisting that he had helped Berend and others not on account of their race, but in the interests of the smooth operation of the university and on account of the need to keep hold of "the best men". Two of his better known students, identified by the authorities as Jewish or half-Jewish, whom Petersen helped to escape the country after their situation in Germany had become unacceptably dangerous, were Richard Alewyn and Charlotte Jolles. Both later spoke of him with nothing but respect, despite his well-publicised statements, during the Hitler years, in support of National Socialism. When Petersen died in 1941 it was Alewyn, by this time resident in America, who published an obituary in "German Quarterly", a periodical publication produced by the "American Association of Teachers of German", in which he defended his former tutor's integrity and paid tribute to his helpfulness.

== Works ==
The principal focus of Julius Petersen's teaching and research was on Middle High German language and literature, from the medieval period, and German literature of the New High German (modern) period, running roughly from the sixteenth to the nineteenth centuries. He built his reputation most effectively through his work on some of the most iconic classics of German literature, most particularly Goethe, Schiller, and Hölderlin.

A major project of his later years was a large-scale work intended to provide a systematic overview of literary studies. Five volumes were planned, with the title "Die Wissenschaft von der Dichtung". The first set of two volumes, entitled "Werk und Dichter" (loosely, "Poets and their works") was published in 1939. The second set, consisting of three volumes, was entitled "Dichtung in Raum und Zeit" (loosely, "Poetry in Space and Time"). It was still unpublished when he died, but it proved possible to add some final detailed corrections from the manuscripts and publish it posthumously in 1944, expanded to include an introduction, by Erich Trunz, whose own academic career took off, in some respects, at the point at which Petersen's had ended.

== Recognition ==
in 1922 Petersen was accepted as an ordinary (full) member of the Prussian Academy of Sciences and Humanities. In 1927 he became, in addition, a corresponding member of its Bavarian equivalent. Despite his efforts to ingratiate himself with the new rulers after 1933, it is not entirely clear that he was able to sustain his links with these prestigious institutions during the Hitler years, however. After 1945, the expression "Berlin school" was used for the philological approach associated with Petersen and his students.
