= Bad Blood (The X-Files) =

- The X-Files episode
- Patrick Renna as Ronnie Strickland: a vampire. The faux vampire teeth—which were sardonically labeled "funny fangs"—were created by makeup coordinator Toby Lindala. The glowing eyes were created with a fluorescent material.
- Episode no.: Season 5 Episode 12
- Directed by: Cliff Bole
- Written by: Vince Gilligan
- Production code: 5X12
- Original air date: February 22, 1998
- Running time: 45 minutes

Guest appearances
- Mitch Pileggi as Walter Skinner; Luke Wilson as Sheriff Hartwell; Patrick Renna as Ronnie Strickland; Forbes Angus as Funeral Director; Marion Killinger as Detective; David Major as Vampire; Brent Butt as Coroner

Episode chronology
← Previous "Kill Switch"	Next → "Patient X"
- The X-Files season 5

"Bad Blood" is the twelfth episode of the fifth season of the American science fiction television series The X-Files. Written by Vince Gilligan, directed by Cliff Bole, and featuring guest appearances from Luke Wilson and Patrick Renna, it aired in the United States on February 22, 1998, on the Fox network. The episode is a "Monster-of-the-Week" story, unconnected to the series' wider mythology. The episode received a Nielsen rating of 12.0, being watched by 19.25 million viewers. In addition, "Bad Blood" received largely positive reviews, with many critics praising the episode's humor.

The show centers on FBI special agents Fox Mulder (David Duchovny) and Dana Scully (Gillian Anderson) who work on cases linked to the paranormal, called X-Files. Mulder is a believer in the paranormal, while the skeptical Scully has been assigned to debunk his work.

In this episode, Mulder and Scully must report to their supervisor, Assistant Director Walter Skinner (Mitch Pileggi) after Mulder kills a young man he believes to be a vampire. The agents each tell a different version of events, leading them to realize the inconsistencies in their investigation.

"Bad Blood" was inspired by an episode of The Dick Van Dyke Show in which the main characters tell different versions of a fight they had. According to critical analysis of the episode, "Bad Blood" explores the dynamics of the relationship between Mulder and Scully, with some reading the episode in relation to the male gaze. The episode's makeup and special effect coordinators used various techniques to create many of the effects seen in the episode, such as the vampire teeth, the glowing eyes, and the bite marks.

== Plot ==
One night, Fox Mulder (David Duchovny) kills a young man whom he believes to be a vampire, but who it turns out is wearing fake fangs. Afterwards, he and his FBI partner, Special Agent Dana Scully (Gillian Anderson) must report to Assistant Director Walter Skinner (Mitch Pileggi). Before they do so, they attempt to get their stories straight.

Scully tells her version of the story in a flashback to the previous day. She arrives at work and Mulder tells her about a murder in Texas, which he believes to be the work of vampires. In her telling, Mulder is exuberant, insensitive, and irritating, while she is calm and mindful. The agents travel to the small town of Chaney, Texas, where they meet Sheriff Hartwell (Luke Wilson), whom Scully finds very charming. Mulder and Hartwell leave to investigate further while Scully autopsies the body. She discovers that the victim, whose last meal had been pizza, was incapacitated with chloral hydrate. She returns to the motel room and orders a pizza, but Mulder soon appears and sends her back to autopsy another body. She leaves him just as her food is delivered. When she finds that the second victim had also ingested chloral hydrate in a pizza, she realizes Mulder is in danger and returns to the motel room. She finds him about to be attacked by the pizza delivery boy, Ronnie Strickland (Patrick Renna). She shoots at Ronnie, who runs off into the woods. When she catches up to him, Mulder has gotten there first and hammered a stake into Ronnie's heart.

Mulder tells Scully his version. In his recollection, he is sensitive and polite to Scully, while she is dismissive and irritable, and clearly enamored with Sheriff Hartwell (who, in Mulder's telling, is unrefined and has obvious buck teeth). While Scully is performing the autopsy, Mulder and Hartwell are called to the local RV park, where they find another exsanguinated body. Mulder returns to the motel room; after Scully has left, he eats her pizza and realizes that he has been drugged. Ronnie enters, with glowing green eyes, and prepares to attack Mulder, but Mulder manages to postpone his demise by scattering sunflower seeds on the floor, which Ronnie compulsively starts to pick up. Scully enters and shoots Ronnie, but the bullets have no effect, and Ronnie runs out with Scully in pursuit. Mulder recovers from being drugged, fashions a stake from a chair leg, and runs after Ronnie.

Back in the office, Scully says that no one will believe Mulder's story; he contends that Ronnie's autopsy will vindicate him. But when the Texas coroner preparing to perform the autopsy removes the stake from Ronnie's chest, he wakes up and escapes. Skinner sends Mulder and Scully back to Texas to investigate. Scully stakes out the cemetery with Sheriff Hartwell, while Mulder goes to the RV park. As they wait, Sheriff Hartwell gives Scully a hot drink, apologizes to her on behalf of Ronnie, and says that he makes them all look bad, making it clear that he too is a vampire. Scully belatedly realizes she has been drugged, as she sees Sheriff Hartwell's eyes turning green.

At the RV park, Mulder finds Ronnie asleep in a coffin. As he tries to arrest him, Mulder is surrounded and overwhelmed by people with glowing green eyes. He wakes up the next morning in the RV park, in his car, where he is rejoined by Scully. They are both unharmed, and the vampires have departed in their RVs. Back in Washington, the agents give their unified report to Skinner, who is dumbfounded.

== Production ==
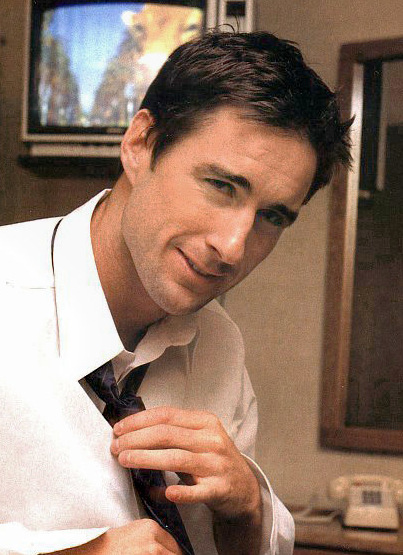
Luke Wilson appeared in this episode as Sheriff Hartwell.

=== Writing and filming ===
"Bad Blood" was written by Vince Gilligan, making it his fifth writing credit for the season. Aware that an episode script was due after the Christmas break of 1997, he had been working on a script that would have taken the form of an Unsolved Mysteries episode, with unknown actors playing Mulder and Scully and Robert Stack appearing in his role as narrator. Under pressure to complete the script, Gilligan scrapped the idea because he "just couldn't figure out how to do it". (The series would later explore the idea of an X-Files crossover in the guise of non-fiction with the seventh season episode "X-Cops", also penned by Gilligan.)

With the help of executive producer Frank Spotnitz, Gilligan came up with a new idea inspired by an episode of The Dick Van Dyke Show, called "The Night the Roof Fell In", in which the main characters, Rob and Laura Petrie, tell different versions of a fight they have had. Gilligan said of the idea, "I just thought it was a cool way to tell a story." With two versions of the same story taking up much of the episode, Gilligan knew that he would have to keep the plot simple, and so he settled on a vampire story that everyone could easily follow. Both Mulder and Scully's unique versions of the episode were filmed back to back, utilizing the "exact same sets and camera angles". The RV park that was featured in the episode stood on the site of an old sawmill that had burned down; in fact, this mill had been used by the show in the fourth season episode "Gethsemane".

=== Casting and effects ===
Luke Wilson was cast to play Sheriff Hartwell; he had previously starred in the comedy film Home Fries (1998), which had been scripted by Vince Gilligan. Local Vancouver comedian and actor Brent Butt played the coroner. Patrick Renna played Ronnie Strickland. He said of the part, "Before we started I asked if Ronnie was pretending to be a moron. [The writers and producers] told me, 'No. He's really just a moron.'"

The out of control RV was created by the show's special effects coordinator, David Gauthier; a secondary steering wheel was rigged up so that a stunt driver could steer the car from the back of the vehicle, out of the camera's sight. Wilson and Renna were fitted with faux vampire teeth—which were sardonically labelled "funny fangs"—courtesy of special effects makeup coordinator Toby Lindala. Wilson later recounted that they fit comfortably in the actor's mouth, musing, "The retainers I had to wear as a kid never fit as well." In order to create the glowing green eyes of the vampires, fluorescent material was glued to the actors' eyelids. However, because they were unable to see, this gave the vampires a "somewhat vacant" stare. The corpses with fangs marks were created by makeup artist Laverne Basham. In order to create a suitable model for the bite marks, Gilligan bit the back of his hand "to show [Basham] exactly what he wanted."

== Themes ==
According to Susanne Kord and Elisabeth Krimmer, "Bad Blood" explores the dynamics of the relationship between Mulder and Scully by "develop[ing] the dysfunctional potential of [their] routine interactions." In "Scully Hits the Glass Ceiling: Postmodernism, Postfeminism, Posthumanism and The X-Files", Linda Badley suggests that The X-Files often subverts the concept of the male gaze through the whole series and "Bad Blood" includes an example of this, allowing Scully to be the one that gazes at Sheriff Hartwell.

Michelle Bush, in her book Myth-X, described the episode as allowing the viewer "a peek inside [Mulder and Scully's] heads" by showing how they see themselves and each other, as well as "their insecurities about their attractiveness to the other". The title "Bad Blood" can be applied to the tension between the two characters in the episode. She described how in each of their stories they try to describe themselves in the way the other would find attractive.

== Reception ==
=== Ratings ===
"Bad Blood" was first broadcast in the United States on February 22, 1998, on the Fox network. In its original broadcast, it was watched by 19.25 million viewers, according to the Nielsen ratings system. It received a 12.0 rating/17 share among viewers meaning that 12.0 percent of all households in the United States, and 17 percent of all people watching television at the time, viewed the episode. The episode was one of eight featured on Revelations, a DVD released prior to the release of the 2008 movie, The X-Files: I Want to Believe.

=== Reviews ===
"Bad Blood" received largely positive reviews from critics. In a 2000 review of season five for the New Straits Times, Francis Dass called the episode "an absolute gem. The most hilarious X-Files episode I have ever seen." Rebecca Traister of Salon.com called it "possibly the best X-Files episode of all time". In a 2008 review of the Revelations DVD, which contained "Bad Blood", Erik Henriksen of The Portland Mercury praised the way the writers "managed to tweak their genre formulas" and said of the episode, "It's witty and quick and features a great performance from Luke Wilson". In a review of Revelations for the Reading Eagle, Gina McIntyre called the episode "a hilarious riff on how [Mulder and Scully] view each other". Zack Handlen of The A.V. Club wrote a positive review of what he described as one of his "top five favorite X-Files". He called the script "very smart" and compared the story to the plot of Rashomon. He said "Yes, 'Bad Blood' can be goofy, but it's a good kind of goofy, the kind that pokes holes in characters in ways that just make them more lovable." Robert Shearman and Lars Pearson, in their book Wanting to Believe: A Critical Guide to The X-Files, Millennium & The Lone Gunmen, rated the episode five stars out of five and wrote "Now that's how you tell a vampire story!" The two praised Gilligan's use of humor as well as the episode's examination of both Mulder and Scully's differing points of views. Shearman and Pearson noted that "the gimmick here isn't supernatural, but structural", and called the episode's framing device "subtly done", which resulted in its "brilliance". Review website IGN named it the seventh best standalone X-Files episode of the entire series. Rob Bricken from Topless Robot named "Bad Blood" the funniest X-Files episode. An article in The Montreal Gazette listed "Bad Blood" as the ninth best stand-alone episode of the series. Tom Kessenich, in his book Examination: An Unauthorized Look at Seasons 6–9 of the X-Files, named the episode one of the "Top 25 Episode of All Time" of The X-Files, ranking it at number 19. He called the episode "a satiric X-File at is finest." Den of Geek writer Juliette Harrisson named it the "finest" stand-alone episode of season 5 and wrote, "for sheer fun and narrative playfulness, the winner has to be Bad Blood".

Not all reviews were so glowing. Paula Vitaris from Cinefantastique gave the episode a more mixed review and awarded it two-and-a-half stars out of four. Although she enjoyed the comedic elements of the episode, she was somewhat critical of the underlying issues, most notably the way Mulder and Scully viewed each other in the episode. She wrote that, "their relationship seems to be a strangely passive-aggressive one". Vitaris also was critical of the fact that Mulder did not feel guilty over the fact that he may have killed an innocent boy.

Gillian Anderson has described "Bad Blood" as one of her favorites of the series, commenting "Oh, yes! I loved that episode. As far as I'm concerned it's one of our best ever. I think it really showed how well David and I can work together".

== See also ==
- List of unmade episodes of The X-Files
- List of vampire television series

== Bibliography ==
- Badley, Linda (2000), "Scully Hits the Glass Ceiling: Postmodernism, Postfeminism, Posthumanism and The X-Files", in Helford, Elyce Rae (ed.), Fantasy Girls: Gender in the New Universe of Science Fiction and Fantasy Television, Lanham: Rowman & Littlefield, ISBN 978-0-8476-9834-9
- Bush, Michelle (2008). Myth-X. Lulu. ISBN 978-1-4357-4688-6.
- Kessenich, Tom (2002). Examination: An Unauthorized Look at Seasons 6–9 of the X-Files. Trafford Publishing. ISBN 1-55369-812-6.
- Kord, Susanne; Krimmer, Elisabeth (2005). Hollywood Divas, Indie Queens, and TV Heroines: Contemporary Screen Images of Women. Rowman & Littlefield. ISBN 978-0-7425-3708-8.
- Meisler, Andy (1999), Resist or Serve: The Official Guide to The X-Files, Vol. 4, London: HarperCollins, ISBN 978-0-00-257133-3
- Shapiro, Marc (2000). All Things: The Official Guide to the X-Files Volume 6. Harper Prism. ISBN 0-06-107611-2.
- Shearman, Robert; Pearson, Lars (2009). Wanting to Believe: A Critical Guide to The X-Files, Millennium & The Lone Gunmen. Mad Norwegian Press. ISBN 978-0-9759446-9-1.
