= Bernhard Diebold =

Swiss journalist (1886–1945)

- Born: Bernhard Ludwig Dreifus; 3 January 1886; Zürich, Switzerland
- Died: 9 August 1945 (aged 59); Zürich, Switzerland
- Education: Burgtheater, Vienna
- Occupations: theatre critic journalist/essayist writer
- Spouse: Gabrielle Maria Betz (1887–1951)
- Children: 2
- Parent(s): Michel Wolf Dreifus (1816–77); Emilie Louise Diebold (1848–1932)

Bernhard Diebold (born Bernhard Ludwig Dreifus; 6 January 1886 – 9 August 1945) was a Swiss theatre critic and writer.

== Life ==
Bernhard Ludwig Dreifus was born into a protestant family in Zürich. His father, Bernhard Dreifus (1844–1929), was a Zürich businessman, originally from Aargau. His mother, Emilie Louise Diebold (1848–1932), came from a well established Zürich family. His parents divorced in 1900 following which, in 1902, he registered a name change from Bernhard Dreifus to Bernhard Diebold.

Between 1904 and 1906 he studied Law at Zürich, cutting short his studies and moving to Vienna in 1906, possibly inspired by Josef Kainz. He volunteered at the city's Court Theatre ("Burgtheater"), taking small stage parts and studying at its theatre school between 1906 and 1908. He went on to study Drama and Germanistics in Vienna and Berlin. His teachers at Berlin included Max Herrmann and Erich Schmidt. It was Herrmann who supervised his doctorate, which he received at Bern in 1912 for a piece of work on "The role of comportment in eighteenth century theatre" ("Das Rollenfach im deutschen Theaterbetrieb des 18. Jahrhunderts"), which was published the next year as a small book.

Diebold lived in Munich from 1913, working as a Dramaturge at the Schauspielhaus (as the "Kammerspiele" theatre was known at that time). At the same time he wrote his first theatre critiques and reviews. In 1917 he relocated again, to Frankfurt where he worked as an editor on the Feuilleton section of the city's Frankfurter Allgemeine Zeitung (FAZ). Since 1916 he had also been contributing arts related pieces to other newspapers, notably the Neue Zürcher Zeitung, but the principal focus of his newspaper career nevertheless remained on the FAZ for the rest of his career in Germany, which lasted till 1935. In addition to theatrical critiques he became known for his essays, travel reports and light-hearted opinion pieces ("scherzhafte Feuilletons").

Diebold's book "Anarchy in Drama" appeared in 1921. It became a standard work, reaching its fourth edition in 1928. It has been described as his most significant work, still relevant as a dramaturgy of expressionism, not simply a random set of theatre reviews, but a fundamental unmasking and critique of the spirit of the age (..."die noch|heute gültige Dramaturgie des Expressionismus, nicht etwa eine Sammlung von Theaterreferaten, sondern eine grundlegende Klärung und Kritik des Zeitgeistes."). It was also in 1928 that he relocated to Berlin, where alongside Alfred Kerr and Herbert Ihering he established himself as one of the most respected critics of the Weimar years, not merely in respect of theatre, but also covering the newly emerging world of cinema. Further books followed, such as "The Wagner question revisited" ("Der Fall Wagner. Eine Revision" 1928), based on a planned report on the Bayreuth Festival and "The Book of Good Works 1914–1918" ("Das Buch der guten Werke 1914–1918" 1932) which turned out to be the last book he published during his time in Germany.

Following the successful Nazi power-grab at the start of 1933 he wrote in support of the restrictive cultural policies implemented by Joseph Goebbels on behalf of the new regime. He stayed in Berlin initially. However, at the start of 1934 he was served with a work ban because of his Jewish religion, and in 1935 he was excluded from the Reich Chamber of Literature. He returned to Zürich. In 1936 he was still contributing to the Frankfurter Allgemeine Zeitung as a correspondent, but in that year he was served with a writing ban. Journalistic contributions continued, now appearing in Swiss papers such as the Neue Zürcher Zeitung, Die Tat and Basler Nationalzeitung, but the volume of his journalism diminished as he set about professional diversification. With Julius Marx, between 1935 and 1939 he built up a film distribution business, "THEMA", but the business was unable to attract funding and collapsed. He also applied himself as a prose writer, publishing in 1938 an 840 page novel, "Das Reich ohne Mitte", which dealt with the failure of the political centre in Germany. His efforts as a prose writer beyond the journalistic milieu brought him no success, however. Meanwhile, he continued to contribute to Swiss newspapers, notably Die Tat, for the rest of his life.

On 9 August 1945 Bernhard Diebold died in Zürich after a short illness.
