= Death of the novel =

The death of the novel is the theoretical discussion of the declining importance of the novel as literary form. Many 20th-century authors entered into the debate, often sharing their ideas in their own fiction and non-fiction writings.

== History ==
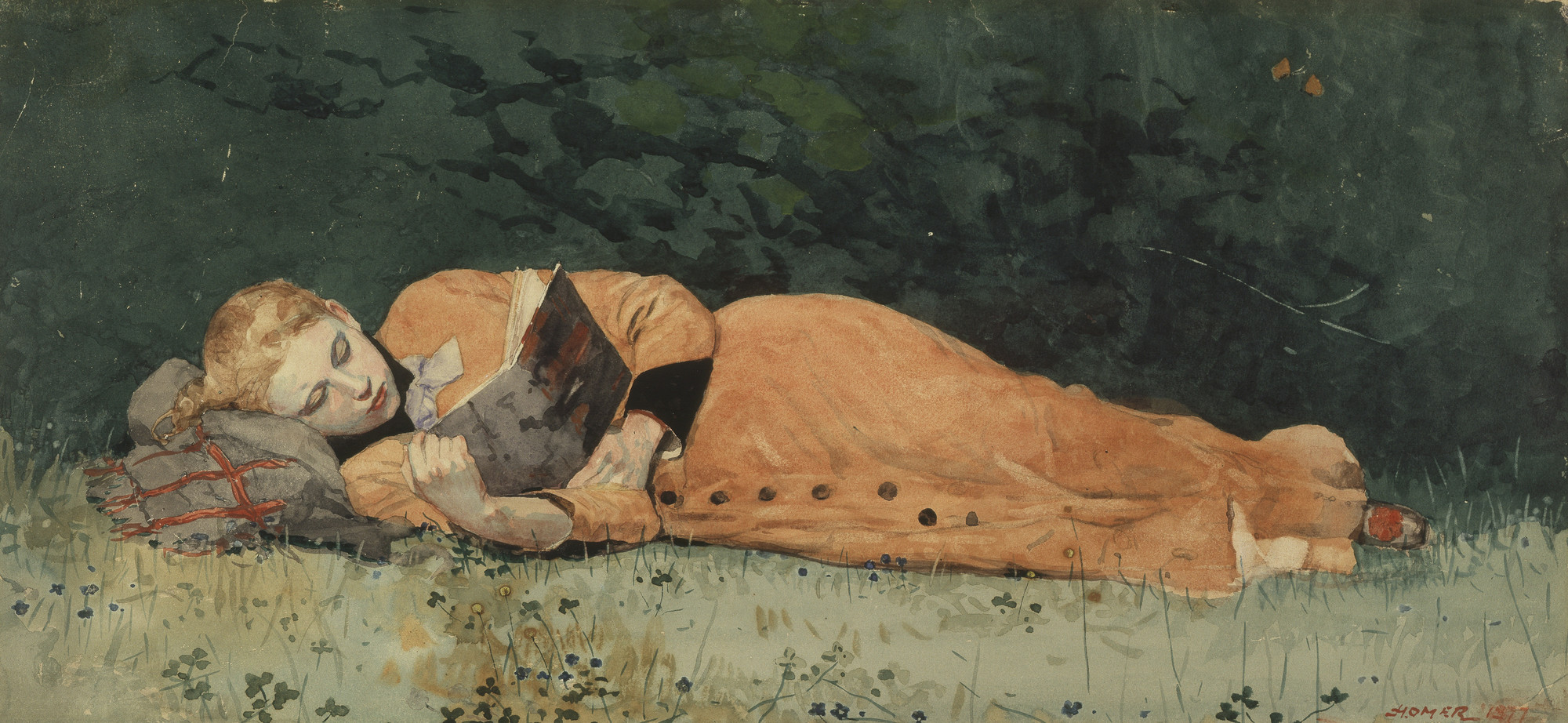
Winslow Homer, The New Novel, 1877

The novel was well-defined by the 19th century. In the 20th century, however, many writers began to rebel against the traditional structures imposed by this form. This reaction against the novel caused some literary theorists to question the relevance of the novel and even to predict its 'death.'

Some of the earliest proponents of the "death of the novel" were José Ortega y Gasset, who wrote his Decline of the Novel in 1925 and Walter Benjamin in his 1930 review Krisis des Romans (Crisis of the Novel).

In the 1950s and 1960s, contributors to the discussion included Gore Vidal, Roland Barthes, and John Barth. Ronald Sukenick wrote the story The Death of the Novel in 1969. In 1954, Wolfgang Kayser argued that the death of the narrator would lead to the death of the novel—a view that has since been contested by many people.

Meanwhile, Alain Robbe-Grillet argued that the novel would be likely to atrophy and die as a literary form if it did not advance beyond 19th century structures; this admonition led to his creation of the New Novel or Nouveau roman.

Tom Wolfe in the 1970s predicted that the New Journalism would displace the novel. Italo Calvino is considered to have turned round the question "is the novel dead?", as "is it possible to tell stories that are not novels?"

== Causes ==
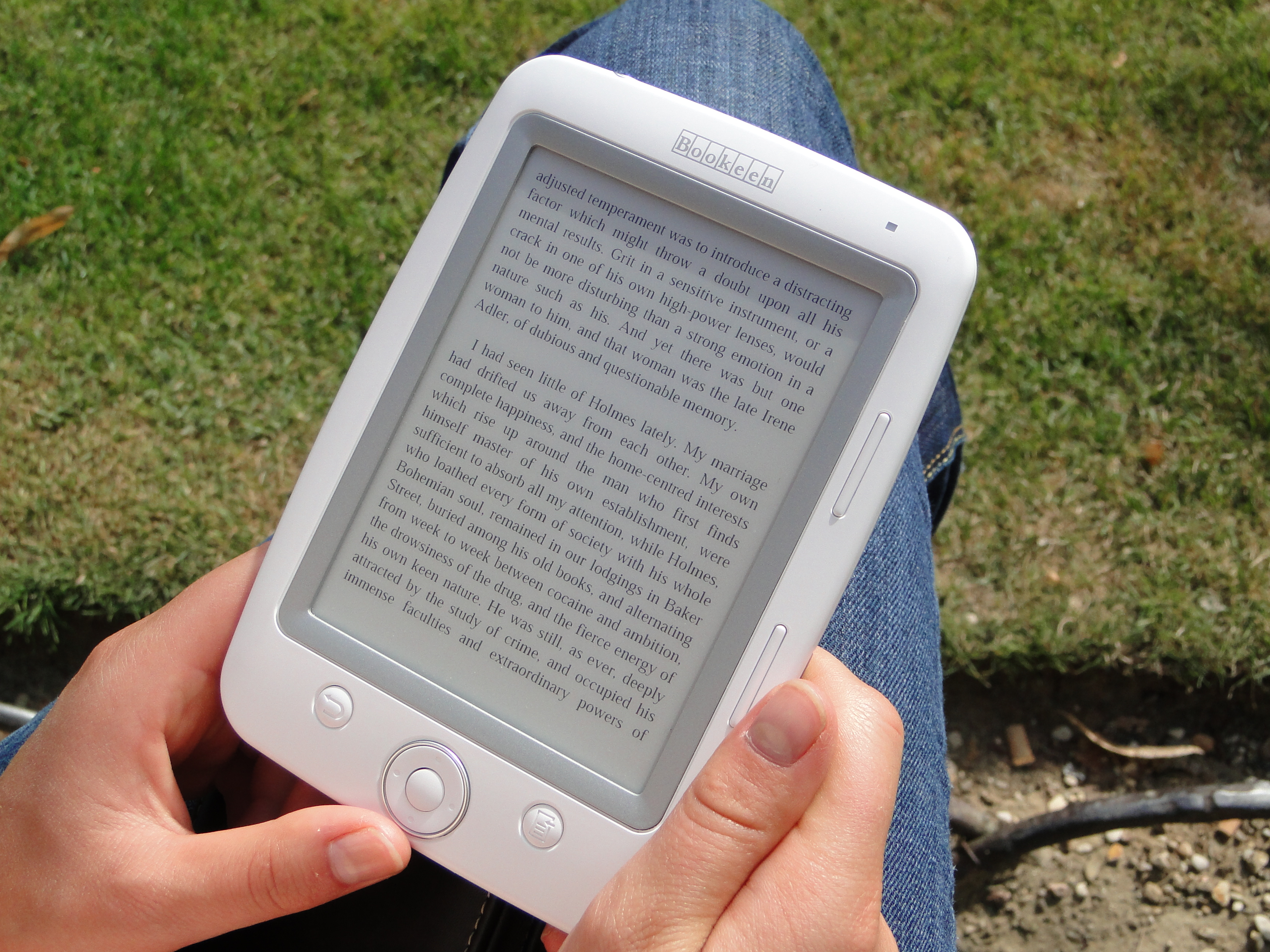
The e-book, one of the "main causes of the death of novels"

As for causes, Robert B. Pippin connects the 'death of the novel' with the rise of nihilism in European culture. Saul Bellow, discussing Ravelstein which was loosely a portrait of Allan Bloom, commented on a connection to the idea that they are really saying that there are no significant people to write about.

On the other hand, David Foster Wallace connected the 'death of the novel' with the mortality of the post-war generation of American novelists.

Will Self discussed the idea of the death of the novel, as a microcosm of the wider debate about the death of the book itself, in relation to the transition from a Gutenberg era of printing to the post-Gutenberg era of the information age. He has even questioned the longevity of the bookshelf, let alone the book.

Technological change is often identified as a major possible cause. Anxieties about the disappearance of the book, as well as the novel, have been common throughout the 20th century. Henry Kannberg sees the post-Gutenberg age as being one where the entire morphology of literature may transform as a result of 'hyper-literacy' and the exponential abundance of texts. He argues that there may be a rebirth of the novel, or the birth of a descendant to it. Similar observations were made by Marcus du Sautoy who argued that technology allows for changes to books and novel-writing that are only just beginning to be explored.

== Criticism ==
Contemporary scholars such as Kathleen Fitzpatrick argue that claims of the novel's death were highly exaggerated, and that such claims often reflect anxiety about changes in the twentieth-century media landscape, as well as more submerged anxieties about social changes within the United States itself.

For Salman Rushdie, the postwar notion of the 'death of the novel' is one that has tended to exhibit certain First World assumptions based on imperialistic nostalgia.

== In other media ==
There has also been debate among film critics like David Thomson and David Denby about the death of cinema and the state of movie theater-going altogether.

Two films questioning "cinema as a dying art", Room 666 (1982) and Room 999 (2023), features answers given by a diverse set of film directors ranging from Steven Spielberg to Jean-Luc Godard.

== See also ==
- "The Literature of Exhaustion" by John Barth
- The True Story of the Novel by Margaret Anne Doody
- The Great American Novel
