= Walther Killy =

German literary scholar

- Born: 26 August 1917; Bonn, German Empire
- Died: 28 December 1995 (aged 78); Kampen, Germany
- Occupations: Literary scholar; Editor
- Organizations: Free University of Berlin; Georg-August-Universität Göttingen; University of Bremen; University of Bern
- Awards: Sigmund Freud Prize

Walther Killy (26 August 1917 – 28 December 1995) was a German literary scholar who specialised in poetry, especially that of Friedrich Hölderlin and Georg Trakl. He taught at the Free University of Berlin, the Georg-August-Universität Göttingen, as founding rector of the University of Bremen, as visiting scholar at the University of California and Harvard University, and at the University of Bern. He became known as editor of literary encyclopedias, the Killy Literaturlexikon and the Deutsche Biographische Enzyklopädie.

== Life ==
Killy was born in Bonn, the son of the lawyer Leo Killy. He studied German, and wrote his doctoral thesis Die Überlieferung der Gedichte Hölderlins, about the tradition of poems by Friedrich Hölderlin, with Julius Petersen in 1940. Killy and his father encouraged Petersen and Friedrich Beißner in Weimar to produce a historical-critical edition of Hölderlin's works, planned to appear in time for the Hölderlin anniversary year 1943. Since Hölderlin was held in high esteem during the Nazi era, this undertaking received broad official support.

When Killy returned from being a prisoner of war in Colorado, he received his doctorate from the Eberhard-Karls-Universität Tübingen on 19 March 1948 with a dissertation entitled Bild und Mythe in Hölderlin's Poems (Image and myth in Hölderlin's poems). Three years later, he received his habilitation at the Free University of Berlin (FU) with a textual critic of Hölderlin's novel Hyperion. In 1955, Killy was appointed professor for German Studies at the FU. He moved to the Georg-August-Universität Göttingen in 1961. Elected as its rector for the academic year 1967/68, he lectured about poems by the young Bertolt Brecht in his Rector's speech. In 1966, he was elected a member of the Akademie der Wissenschaften zu Göttingen.

From 1968 to 1970, he was chairman of the founding committee of the University of Bremen (founding rector). He was a visiting scholar at the University of California and at Harvard University in 1969. In 1971, he moved to the University of Bern. From 1978 to 1985, he was director of the research program of the Herzog August Bibliothek in Wolfenbüttel. He was a member of the Braunschweigische Wissenschaftliche Gesellschaft 1979. He was awarded the Niedersachsenpreis for journalism in 1983, and the Sigmund Freud Prize for academic prose in 1990.

Killy died at the age of 78 in Kampen, Sylt.

In 1996, the library of the Otto von Guericke University Magdeburg acquired the Killy's private library. The unique collection contains 6414 titles from the publication years 1557 to 1995. Part of the Killy Library is one of the most valuable Paul Celan collections in Europe with many dedicatory copies, and a copy of the 1698 first edition of Poetische Wälder by Christian Gryphius. All publications of this library are available in the catalogue of the university library.

== Publisher ==
Killy was editor of many compendia and anthologies as well as initiator and organiser of encyclopaedias, including Bertelsmann's Literaturlexikon (Literary Encyclopedia), known as "Der Killy". Since 2008, a completely revised new edition has been published by Walter de Gruyter. Killy was also a contributor to the Stuttgart Hölderlin Edition edited by Friedrich Beißner and co-editor of the works of Georg Trakl.

== Publications ==
- Erinnerungen an Frankreich in den Kriegsjahren 1942–44 / Walther Killy; Anton Lüpkes; Wilhelmine Siefkes (typed manuscript)
- Über des späteren Hölderlin Ansicht von der Geschichte. (manuscript). Trinidad (Colorado) 1945
- Bild und Mythe in Hölderlins Gedichten. (dissertation, typed). Tübingen 1948
- Studium Generale und studentisches Gemeinschaftsleben. Ein Bericht erstattet unter Benutzung örtlicher Erhebungen von Rolf Hildebrandt und Hans Lades. Berlin, Duncker & Humblot 1952
- Wandlungen des lyrischen Bildes. Göttingen: Vandenhoeck & Ruprecht, 1956 (late edition: ISBN 3-525-34008-7).
- Über Georg Trakl. Göttingen: Vandenhoeck & Ruprecht, 1960
- Deutscher Kitsch. Ein Versuch mit Beispielen. Göttingen: Vandenhoeck & Ruprecht, 1961 (late edition: ISBN 3-525-33181-9).
- Wirklichkeit und Kunstcharakter. 9 Romane des 19. Jahrhunderts. Munich: Beck, 1963
- Über Gedichte des jungen Brecht. Rektoratsrede. Göttingen: Vandenhoeck & Ruprecht, 1967
- Bildungsfragen. Munich: Beck, 1971. ISBN 3-406-02476-9
- Elemente der Lyrik. 2nd revised edition. Munich: Beck, 1972, ISBN 3-406-01735-5 [first edition 1972; new edition: Munich, 1983, ISBN 3-423-04417-9]
- Schreibweisen – Leseweisen Munich: Beck, 1982. ISBN 3-406-09086-9
- Von Berlin bis Wandsbek. Zwölf Kapitel deutscher Bürgerkultur um 1800. Munich: Beck, 1996. ISBN 3-406-40391-3.

Editor

- Zeichen der Zeit. Ein deutsches Lesebuch in 4 Bänden. Frankfurt; Hamburg: Fischer Bücherei, 1958–1962
- With Wolf-Hartmut Friedrich: Das Fischer-Lexikon. Part 34: Literatur 1. Frankfurt: Fischer-Taschenbuch-Verl., 1964.
- With Hans Szklenar: Georg Trakl: Dichtungen und Briefe. Salzburg: O. Müller, 1970
- Deutsches Lesebuch: Ein Lesebuch in 5 Bänden. Frankfurt, Hamburg: Fischer-Bücherei, 1970
- Epochen der deutschen Lyrik (10 volumes). Munich, 1974–1977
- Die deutsche Literatur. Texte und Zeugnisse (7 volumes). Munich: Beck, 1967–1988
- Literaturlexikon. Autoren und Werke deutscher Sprache (15 volumes). Gütersloh, Munich: Bertelsmann-Lexikon-Verlag, 1988–1991 (CD-ROM: Berlin 1998, ISBN 3-932544-13-7)
- With Rudolf Vierhaus from vol. 4: Deutsche Biographische Enzyklopädie. 13 volumes, Munich Saur, 1995–2003. ISBN 3-598-23160-1
