= Max Herrmann =

Max Herrmann may refer to:

- Max Herrmann (theatrologist) (1865–1942), German literary historian and theorist of theatre studies
- Max Herrmann (athlete) (1885–1915), German sprinter
