= Susanne Kord =

British scholar on Women's Studies, Literary Studies, and Film Studies

Susanne Kord in 2026 Photograph by Colin Bailey

Theresia Susanne Kord, or T. S. Kord is a scholar of women's studies, literary studies and film studies, and the author of 11 books and 70 scholarly articles published in four languages.

== Academic career ==
Kord is a Professor Emeritus at University College London, where she held the Chair of German from 2004-2024. She was visiting fellow at the All Souls College, Oxford; visiting scholar at the St John's College, Oxford; and visiting professor at the University of Edinburgh.

Kord was elected Fellow of the British Academy in 2021; Fellow of the British Royal Historical Society in 2015; and Honorary Secretary and Council Member of the English branch of the Goethe Society in 2008.

Kord spent 16 years as an academic in the United States: with tenured positions at Georgetown University (Washington, D.C., 1993-2004), where she was George M. Roth Distinguished Professor; and at the University of Cincinnati (Ohio, 1990–93). She was also visiting lecturer at Dartmouth College in the United States from 1988-1990.

Kord earned an M.A. degree in English and American literature at Philipps Universität Marburg (Germany), and an M.A. and PhD in German literature (1990) at the University of Massachusetts, Amherst (United States).

== Research Focus ==
Kord's first two books, written in German, focused on little-known female German authors of the 18th and 19th centuries. Her 1992 book, Ein Blick hinter die Kulissen (A Glance Backstage, 1992), was the first comprehensive historical study of eighteenth- and nineteenth century women playwrights and is credited with the rediscovery of many of these writers. The work won Swiss National Radio's Best Book of the Year Award in 1993. Her 1996 book, Sich einen Namen machen (Making a Name for Herself), delved into eighteenth- and nineteenth century women writers' strategies of using pseudonyms to conceal their gender.

Kord's interests branched out in the early 2000s into Comparative Literature and Film Studies and she began to publish in English. She explored subjects ranging from 18th-century women peasant poets in Germany and the British Isles, real-life and fictional murderesses in 18th century Germany, gender in Hollywood films, time travel in science fiction films and philosophy in modern horror films to the rise of antisemitism in Germany and Austria before both World Wars.

== Literary translations ==
Kord has translated the works of little-known female authors from German to English, including the naturalist playwright Elsa Bernstein and Goethe associate, playwright and novelist Charlotte von Stein. Her literary translations of dramatic plays from German to English include Elsa Bernstein's Dämmerung (1893), published as 'Twilight', and Bernstein's drama Maria Arndt (1908), performed at the Steppenwolf Theatre Company in Chicago, March 2002.

== Poetry ==
In the 1990s, Kord published poetry in English and German in various journals, holding public readings at the German Embassy in Washington, D.C. In 1994, she was awarded the Robert L. Kahn Lyrik-Preis by the Society for Contemporary American Literature in German, for her poem ‘grammatik’ (published in Trans-Lit, 1994). The themes of Kord’s published poetry draw on her professional research on challenges faced by female authors, and on the poverty she observed in Cincinnati and Washington, D.C. neighborhoods.

== Alternate author names ==
Kord sometimes employs a gender-concealing alias. Her books Little Horrors (2016) and Lovable Crooks (2018) were published under the gender-neutral author name T. S. Kord, leading some reviewers of both works to assume she was male.

== Awards ==
Kord has won six awards for her writing, including the 2012 Choice Outstanding Academic Title of the Year (for her book with Elisabeth Krimmer, Contemporary Hollywood Masculinities) and the Forum Prize, Best Article of the Year, for The Rule of Law and the Role of Literature: German Public Debates on Husband Killers and Human Rights, Forum for Modern Language Studies, (January 2012).

== Academic style ==
Kord's scholarship, which originated in the effort to make lost work by women accessible to a modern readership, employs a straightforward writing style that is often noted in reviews. This has on occasion put her at odds with the idea that "academic communication is fundamentally different from everyday vernacular discourse." Kord holds that serious scholarship is not compromised by approachable language: "I've never been a fan of the academic credo that if a book is comprehensible to more than three people, the author must have sold out."
