= Albert Köster =

German germanist and theater scholar

Albert Johannes Köster (7 November 1862 – 29 May 1924) was a German Germanist and theater scholar.

== Life ==
Born in the Free and Hanseatic City of Hamburg as the son of a wine wholesaler, Köster attended the Johanneum in Hamburg, where he passed the Abitur in 1882. He then studied at the Universities of Tübingen and Leipzig Law and Berlin Philology and History of Literature. In 1887, he received his doctorate in history from Wilhelm Maurenbrecher and Georg Voigt in Leipzig. The subject of his dissertation was: "Die Wormser Annalen. An investigation of the sources".

From 1887, he was a private scholar in Hamburg and in 1892 he was appointed associate professor of modern German and German literary history at the University of Marburg, a post he held until 1899. From 1893, he was also one of the directors of the German Seminar at the University of Marburg.

In 1899, he was appointed professor of modern German language and literature at the University of Leipzig, succeeding Rudolf Hildebrand. There he was, together with Eduard Sievers Director of the German Seminar. During his time in Leipzig, he received calls to prestigious chairs, for example as successor to his mentor and friend Erich Schmidt at the Humboldt-Universität zu Berlin or at the University of Vienna, which he declined, however.

== Research ==
During his career, his main research interests were German literary history from the 16th to the 19th century, Goethe, Schiller, the Faust saga and Faust poetry, the history and theory of Nhd. metrics, and theatre studies.

Köster shaped the reputation of German studies in Leipzig for over a quarter of a century. He was an excellent connoisseur of the works of Goethe, but published comparatively few major writings and became best known for editing the "Briefe der Frau Rath Goethe" and a critical edition of the works of Theodor Storm.

In addition to his achievements in the field of literary history, Köster was one of the first scholars to strive for methodically founded scientific theatre research. He also compiled a collection on stage history. This was acquired by the Deutsches Theatermuseum after his death, but fell victim for the most part to a bombing raid in 1944. At his request, his extensive library was sold at auction by Walter de Gruyter & Co. 26/27 January 1925.

Many of his students later became well-known scientists or literary figures themselves, such as Ernst Bergmann, Ernst Beutler, Reinhard Buchwald, Werner Deetjen, Alfred Götze, Erich Kästner, Anton Kippenberg, Paul Merker, Robert Herndon Fife, Jr., Julius Petersen, Kurt Pinthus, Fritz Brüggemann and Friedrich Schulze.

Köster died in Leipzig at the age of 61.

== Honours ==
- 1909: Kgl. Sächsischer Geheimer Hofrat

== Memberships ==
- 1888 until 1891: Member of the Berliner Germanistenkneipe
- 1904: Full member of the Saxon Academy of Sciences and Humanities
