= Elisabeth Krimmer =

- Born: 1967 (age 57–58)
- Occupation: Academic
- Years active: 1999-present

According Elisabeth Krimmer (born 1967) is an American academic whose work has focused on war and gender studies in German literature and society. Inspired by her mother's silence on the subject of war in German history, Krimmer's work has focused on uncovering the roles and experiences of women in war. Among her works are books exploring women who dressed as men to become soldiers and books which collected women's remembrances as victims and perpetrators of The Holocaust. She has also written works evaluating women's roles as depicted in film and in leadership positions. She co-wrote with Susanne Kord Contemporary Hollywood Masculinities: Gender, Genre, and Politics, which was selected as a Choice Outstanding Academic Titles of the Association of College and Research Libraries in 2012.

== Early life and education ==
Elisabeth Krimmer was born in 1967. Her parents were of German heritage. When she was growing up, her father spoke of German involvement in World War II, but her mother rarely spoke about it, causing Krimmer to ponder the silence of women. She attended the University of Massachusetts Amherst from 1994 to 1998, earning her Phd with a thesis, Offizier und Amazone: Grauen in Mãnnerkleidung in der deutschen Literatur um 1800 (Officer and Amazon: Terror in Men's Clothing in German Literature around 1800.

== Career ==
After her graduation, Krimmer taught as an assistant professor at Mount Holyoke College, the University of Missouri, Amherst College, and Georgetown University, between 1998 and 2004. She was hired as an assistant professor at University of California, Davis in 2004 and was promoted to associate professor in 2006. Krimmer became a full professor in 2010 and chair of the German and Russian department the following year.

== Research ==
Many of Krimmer's works examine the depiction in German literature of war between the eighteenth and twentieth centuries. Her first book, In the Company of Men: Cross-Dressed Women around 1800 examined women who dressed as men, at a time when doing so was illegal, to serve as soldiers or for traveling, and those who played the breeches role in theatrical productions. The book covered well-known figures like Anne Bonny, Catalina de Erauso, and the Chevalier d'Éon, as well as lesser known figures like Mary Lacey and Happy Ned, also known as Elizabeth Taylor, and Harriet Ormiston. The work examined the social conflicts between women being put to death for wearing men's clothing in battle and literary depictions of saintliness for the same actions, such as for Joan of Arc. It also explored the use of women's cross-dressing in literary works by both male and female authors, notably Goethe, as a means of analyzing gender, identity, and morality in German culture. According to Krimmer, the literary depictions of women who cross-dress generally take two forms, one in which the body plays no part in the revelation of the success of the disguise, and the other in which the biological sex is revealed. By analyzing the varied depictions, the culturally-constructed nature of gender is examined, but according to scholar Edward T. Potter, Krimmer warns that cross-dressing was not a guarantee of liberation for women from culturally defined roles. She returned to examination of the constructed nature of gender roles in her article, "Mama's Baby, Papa's Maybe: Paternity and Bildung in Goethe's Wilhelm Meisters Lehrjahre" ("Mama's Baby, Papa's Maybe: Paternity and Education in Goethe's Wilhelm Meister's Apprenticeship"). The article examined Goethe's recognition that fatherhood played a social role regardless of paternity.

Other works by Krimmer dealing with the topic of war include The Representation of War in German Literature from 1800 to the Present, which focuses on eight authors, and six wars to show how authors often replicate the rationales for war even if they are critical of it. Drawing on texts by writers such as Elfriede Jelinek, Heinrich von Kleist, Ernst Jünger, Erich Maria Remarque, and Friedrich Schiller she examined the Revolutionary and Napoleonic Wars, World Wars I and II, the Yugoslav conflicts and the Iraq War. Reviewer Gordana-Dana Grozdanic stated that the work was "thought-provoking and engaging", but that it paid insufficient attention to how views of war and peace had changed over time. Grozdanic also said that Krimmer sampled such a small portion of the literature that it might imply continuity where none existed, and that Krimmer assumed that the authors were following a "pacifist agenda" without adequately explaining the meaning of that term. In German Women's Life Writing and the Holocaust Krimmer hoped to fill the void on women's experiences of war by examining diaries, memoirs, and autobiographical novels to uncover "how German women reflected in their writing on their own entanglement with" the Nazi regime. The book looked at various aspects of women's participation including those who were complicit in the crimes of the regime and those who were victims (including women who experienced wartime sexual violence. Historian Christine Nugent, argued that Krimmer's work expelled the notions that all victims or all perpetrators were equal and also demonstrated that while all women suffered during war, they had some degree of agency. Scholars Sandra Alfers and Julia K. Gruber both point out that the volume adds to the complexity of women's experiences, showing that they were not mere bystanders and often were faced with dilemmas such as how to reconcile the meaning of caring with their nursing duties on behalf of the regime.

Krimmer has co-written two works with Susanne Kord, which analyze actor's roles and how they depict men and women in society. In Hollywood Divas, Indie Queens, and TV Heroines: Contemporary Screen Images of Women the duo examined how films of the 1990s reinforce stereotypes but also attempt to break them, offering contradictory role models for women. Scholar David Lancaster stated that Krimmer and Kord concluded that in an attempt to avoid alienating any sector of the viewing public, film-makers of the period either depicted strong women who had agency, or revived historic roles which restricted women's choices and ridiculed and denigrated their actions. According to Lancaster, the duo also noted that television roles for women typically were more women-friendly because multiple episodes over time allowed for more complex character development. The second book, Contemporary Hollywood Masculinities: Gender, Genre, and Politics, examined the way men were portrayed in film during the same period. They argued that roles often depicted men, who did not initially fulfill their potential, but through their own determination, eventually succeeded. Film scholar Laura L. Beadling stated that the duo's analysis showed that films reinforce the upward mobility that men can achieve in democratic and equal societies. Krimmer has also co-edited with Patricia Anne Simpson Realities and Fantasies of German Female Leadership: From Maria Antonia of Saxony to Angela Merkel, which explored whether or not women have historically had the actual power to lead or whether such authority was fictional. The collection shows that before the nineteenth century, women's leadership was primarily a fantasy. From the nineteenth century, progressively women gained authority to lead in various fields within the constraints of changing customs, finally achieving political power, beginning in the twentieth century.

Krimmer's article, "'Eviva il Coltello'?: The Castrato Singer in Eighteenth-Century German Literature and Culture" ("'Revive the Knife'? The Castrato Singer in Eighteenth-Century German Literature and Culture") was awarded the Goethe Essay Prize of the Goethe Society of North America of 2005. Another article, "The Gender of Terror: War as (Im)Moral Institution in Kleist's Hermannsschlacht and Penthesilea" published in 2008 in The German Quarterly, won the annual Max Kade Best Article Prize for that year. (Note: The prize is awarded in the year following publication.) Her book Contemporary Hollywood Masculinities: Gender, Genre, and Politics, co-written with Susanne Kord, was selected as a Choice Outstanding Academic Titles of the Association of College and Research Libraries in 2012.

== Selected works ==
- Krimmer, Elisabeth (2004). In the Company of Men: Cross-Dressed Women around 1800. Detroit, Michigan: Wayne State University Press. ISBN 978-0-8143-3145-3.
- Krimmer, Elisabeth (Summer 2004). "Mama's Baby, Papa's Maybe: Paternity and Bildung in Goethe's Wilhelm Meisters Lehrjahre". The German Quarterly. 77 (3). Hoboken, New Jersey: Wiley-Blackwell: 257–277. ISSN 0016-8831. JSTOR 3252257. OCLC 9970373415.
- Kord, Susanne; Krimmer, Elisabeth (2005). Hollywood Divas, Indie Queens, and TV Heroines: Contemporary Screen Images of Women. Lanham, Maryland: Rowman & Littlefield. ISBN 978-0-7425-3709-5.
- Krimmer, Elisabeth (October 2005). "'Eviva il Coltello'? The Castrato Singer in Eighteenth-Century German Literature and Culture". Publications of the Modern Language Association of America. 120 (5). New York, New York: Cambridge University Press for the Modern Language Association of America: 1543–1559. doi:10.1632/003081205X73380. ISSN 0030-8129. JSTOR 25486267. OCLC 5552745734.
- Krimmer, Elisabeth (Winter 2008). "The Gender of Terror: War as (Im)Moral Institution in Kleist's Hermannsschlacht and Penthesilea". The German Quarterly. 81 (1). Hoboken, New Jersey: Wiley-Blackwell: 66–85. doi:10.1111/j.1756-1183.2008.00008.x. ISSN 0016-8831. JSTOR 27676142. OCLC 5153456536.
- Krimmer, Elisabeth (2010). The Representation of War in German Literature from 1800 to the Present. Cambridge, Cambridgeshire: Cambridge University Press. ISBN 978-0-511-75081-6.
- Kord, Susanne; Krimmer, Elisabeth (2011). Contemporary Hollywood Masculinities: Gender, Genre, and Politics (1st ed.). New York, New York: Palgrave Macmillan. ISBN 978-0-230-33841-8.
- Krimmer, Elisabeth (2018). German Women's Life Writing and the Holocaust: Complicity and Gender in the Second World War. New York, New York: Cambridge University Press. ISBN 978-1-108-47282-1.
- Krimmer, Elisabeth; Simpson, Patricia Anne, eds. (2019). Realities and Fantasies of German Female Leadership: From Maria Antonia of Saxony to Angela Merkel. Martlesham, Suffolk: Boydell & Brewer. ISBN 978-1-78744-562-8.
- Zhang, Chunjie; Krimmer, Elisabeth, eds. (2023). Gender and German Colonialism Intimacies, Accountabilities, Intersections (1st ed.). London, UK: Routledge. ISBN 978-1-003-82179-3.
