= Kurt Pinthus =

German writer (1886–1975)

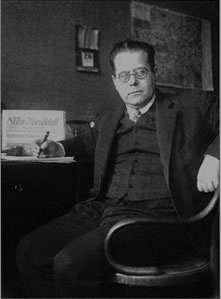
Kurt Pinthus, ca 1920

Kurt Pinthus (identified sometimes by his pseudonym as Paulus Potter: 29 April 1886 – 11 July 1975) was a German author, journalist, critic and commentator.

== Life ==
=== Provenance and early years ===
Kurt Pinthus was born in Erfurt. He grew up in Magdeburg and Erfurt. His father Louis Pinthus (1852–1912) was a Jewish businessman, who married his mother Bertha Rosenthal (1864–1934) in 1885. Kurt attended the "Königliche Gymnasium" (as it was known at that time), one of the two church-sponsored secondary schools in Erfurt.

In 1905 he embarked on his university career, studying successively at Freiburg, Berlin, Geneva and Leipzig: his focus was on History, History of literature and Philosophy. It was from Leipzig that he received his doctorate in 1910, supervised by Albert Köster (1862–1924). His other teachers during this period included the economic historian Karl Lamprecht (1856–1915), the literary historian Georg Witkowski (1863–1939), the literary expressionist Franz Werfel (1890–1945) and the expressionist poet and dramatist Walter Hasenclever (1890–1940), with whom he formed a lifelong friendship.

=== War ===
In 1912 he took a job as a literary editor with the newly founded Kurt Wolff publishing house which brought him into contact with several literary stars of the age, including Franz Kafka, Georg Heym and Else Lasker-Schüler. In 1915 he was conscripted in connection with the war and sent to join then "Kasernendienst" in Magdeburg. Following an accident at the barracks to which he had been assigned he operated a "damages office" on behalf of the injured.

The First World War was followed by economic collapse and a succession of revolutionary uprisings in the ports and cities. With thousands of other disillusioned and unemployed former soldiers, Pinthus participated in the Soldiers' Soviet movement. During 1919/20 he compiled and published Menschheitsdämmerung ("The Twilight of humanity"), an anthology of expressionist poetry from 23 poets (of whom six had been killed during the war). The book was originally produced with a small print run by a small publishing firm in 1919, but following a favourable reception was re-published with a larger print-run in 1920 by Rowohlt. The compilation caught the mood of the times and became a standard literary work, acknowledged by commentators as a chronicle of the development of expressionist literature.

=== Berlin ===
Like his friends Walter Hasenclever and Oskar Kokoschka, in the early summer of 1919 Kurt Pinthus moved to Berlin where he was involved in the postwar refounding of the Rowohlt Publishing Firm. He worked briefly during 1920/21 as a dramaturge at Max Reinhardt's strikingly modernised privately funded and directed theatre in Berlin. The more enduring career that Pinthus built in Berlin during the 1920s was as a critic of stage, literature and film. His contributions appeared regularly in a range of German and international publications, most particularly in "Das Tage-Buch", "Die literarische Welt" and the newly (in 1922) founded "8 Uhr-Abendblatt)". In 1925 he was recruited by Funk-Stunde AG Berlin the first and during this time largest radio broadcaster in Germany, to present a series of literary programmes. His first programme concerned the respected novelist-dramatist Franz Werfel. The series quickly became very popular, and Pinthus continued to work with the broadcaster for eight years, till 1933. As it developed an administrative infrastructure, he became a member of the organisation's literary commission in 1929. It was also in 1929 that he began to lecture regularly at the prestigious Lessing Academy. Pinthus was hugely productive and also, it appears, happy and fulfilled during thin period, attending virtually every new play, film and variety show, a frequent presence at social events, and always surrounded by friends. That ended in 1933.

=== Hitler years ===
During the first part of 1933 the Hitler government lost no time in transforming Germany into a one-party dictatorship. Antisemitism was transformed from a shrill set of populist slogans into a core element of government strategy. The government produced its first "black list" on 16 May 1933. Kurt Pinthus was included on it, and received a "Berufsverbot" (professional ban) which prevented him from public writing, other than for expressly Jewish newspapers and magazines. For several more years, despite the urgent warnings and offers of help from Walter Hasenclever, he persisted with his determination to pursue his career in Nazi Germany under the auspices of the "Jüdischer Kulturbund" ("Jewish Arts and Culture Association"), though his letters to friends indicate that he was becoming ever more lonely and depressed. In 1937, belatedly following the examples and promptings of friends, he fled to the United States of America.

=== America ===
He found a first foothold at The New School for Social Research in New York City, where he was employed as a lecturer between 1938 and 1940. Due to the number of Jewish exiles from Nazi Germany who had already gravitated to the city he found himself with a ready made network of contacts in the literary arts world. Despite having found employment relatively quickly, he nevertheless regularly met with "severe financial problems" for several years. Between October 1941 and the end of 1947 he also held a post as academic consultant in respect of the Theatre Collection at the Library of Congress in Washington, D.C. As part of his work he authored numerous treatises while at the Library of Congress.

Returning to New York, between 1947 and 1961 Kurt Pinthus taught Theatre History at the Columbia University where he accepted a permanent professorship. Already in 1957, however (by which time he had passed his seventieth birthday) he was making regular trips back to Europe. In 1967 he returned to Germany. Magdeburg and Erfurt, the cities in which he had grown up, had ended up after 1945 administered as part of the Soviet occupation zone, relaunched in October 1949 as the Soviet sponsored German Democratic Republic (East Germany), but the version of Germany in which he now made his home was the US backed German Federal Republic (West Germany). Kurt Pinthus settled at Marbach, known to literary scholars as the birthtown of Friedrich Schiller, and located along the Neckar, the river between Stuttgart and Mannheim.

=== Last years ===
Marbach was and remains home to the German [national] Literature Archive, which operates under the auspices of the German Schiller Society, and it was here that Kurt Pinthus worked during his final years. On 27 April 1971 Pinthus marked his eighty-fifth birthday by formally transferring his very considerable personal library to the German Schiller Society. He had acquired most of his collection during the 1920s and 1930s and succeeded in shipping it to New York between December 1937 and May 1938. Reflecting his work as a literary reviewer during the "Weimar years", it includes numerous first editions of volumes that had become very rare thanks to their inclusion in the Nazi book burnings.

== Published output (selection) ==
- Das Kinobuch, Leipzig: Wolff, 1914
- Kriegsabenteuer aus alter Zeit, München: Georg Müller, 1914
- Deutsche Kriegsreden, München, Berlin: Georg Müller, 1916
- as compiler-producer: Menschheitsdämmerung, Symphonie jüngster Dichtung, Rowohlt, Berlin 1920; second edition: Menschheitsdämmerung – Ein Dokument des Expressionismus, with an important biographical appendix, Rowohlt, Reinbek 1959ff, ISBN 3-499-45055-0
- Der Zeitgenosse, Stuttgart: Klett, 1971
