= Killy Literaturlexikon =

German literary encyclopedia

The Killy Literaturlexikon - Autoren und Werke des deutschsprachigen Kulturraumes is an author's lexicon of German language literature. The latest edition of twelve volumes was published between 2008 and September 2011 by De Gruyter. A register volume followed in 2012.

The encyclopaedia, originally published by Walther Killy, was named Literaturlexikon. Autoren und Werke deutscher Sprache (15 volumes). It was published by C. Bertelsmann Verlag from 1988 to 1993. The completely revised new edition by De Gruyter is edited by Wilhelm Kühlmann. The articles contain detailed information on the life and work of the authors as well as detailed and up-to-date information on secondary literature. Due to the high price, it is mainly found in libraries. The selection of the authors is based on a broad concept of literature, so that the encyclopaedia also contains an article on Eugen Drewermann.

== Editions ==
- Walther Killy (ed.): Literaturlexikon. Bertelsmann-Lexikon-Verlag, Gütersloh & Munich 1988–1993. 14 volumes and 1 index volume:
  - Vol. 1. A – Bis. 1988, ISBN 3-570-04671-0.
  - Vol. 2. Bit – Dav. 1989, ISBN 3-570-04672-9.
  - Vol. 3. Dea – Fre. 1989, ISBN 3-570-04673-7.
  - Vol. 4. Fri – Hap. 1989, ISBN 3-570-04674-5.
  - Vol. 5. Har – Hug. 1990, ISBN 3-570-04675-3.
  - Vol. 6. Huh – Kräf. 1990, ISBN 3-570-04676-1.
  - Vol. 7. Kräm – Mas. 1990, ISBN 3-570-04677-X.
  - Vol. 8. Mat – Ord. 1990, ISBN 3-570-04678-8.
  - Vol. 9. Ore – Roq. 1991, ISBN 3-570-04679-6.
  - Vol. 10. Ros – Sel. 1991, ISBN 3-570-04680-X.
  - Vol. 11. Sem – Var. 1991, ISBN 3-570-04681-8.
  - Vol.12. Vas – Z. 1992, ISBN 3-570-04682-6.
  - Vol. 13. Begriffe, Realien, Methoden. 1992, ISBN 3-570-04713-X.
  - Vol. 14. Begriffe, Realien, Methoden. 1993, ISBN 3-570-04714-8.
  - Vol. 15. Register. 1993, ISBN 3-570-04715-6.
- Wilhelm Kühlmann (ed.), Walther Killy: Killy Literaturlexikon. Autoren und Werke des deutschsprachigen Kulturraumes. 2., vollst. überarb. Aufl. de Gruyter, Berlin 2008–2012. 12 volumes and 1 Registerband:
  - Vol. 1 A – Blu. 2008, ISBN 978-3-11-018962-9.
  - Vol. 2 Boa – Den. 2008, ISBN 978-3-11-020375-2.
  - Vol. 3 Dep – Fre. 2008, ISBN 978-3-11-020376-9.
  - Vol. 4 Fri – Hap. 2009, ISBN 978-3-11-021389-8.
  - Vol. 5 Har – Hug. 2009, ISBN 978-3-11-021391-1.
  - Vol. 6 Huh – Kräf. 2009, ISBN 978-3-11-021393-5.
  - Vol. 7 Kräm – Marp. 2010, ISBN 978-3-11-022048-3.
  - Vol. 8 Marq – Or. 2010, ISBN 978-3-11-022046-9.
  - Vol. 9 Os – Roq. 2010, ISBN 978-3-11-022044-5.
  - Vol. 10 Ros – Se. 2011, ISBN 978-3-11-022042-1.
  - Vol. 11 Si – Vi. 2011, ISBN 978-3-11-022040-7.
  - Vol. 12 Vo – Z. 2011, ISBN 978-3-11-022038-4.
  - Vol. 13 Register. 2012, ISBN 978-3-11-022028-5.
