= Happy Ned =

- Born: Elizabeth Harriet Davies; 1831; Penketh, Borough of Warrington, Lancashire, England
- Died: 1887 (aged 55–56)
- Other names: Elizabeth Boydall, Elizabeth Harriet Boydell, Eliza Davies, Harriet Davies, Ned Davies, Neddy Davies, Harriet Harmiston, Navvy Ned, Harriet Ormaston, Harriet Ormiston, Elizabeth Taylor, Harriet Taylor, Lizzie Taylor, Harriet Urmston
- Occupations: Miner, sailor, dockworker, farmhand
- Years active: 1856–1886

Happy Ned or Ned Davies (1831–1887) was the alias of Elizabeth Taylor also known as Harriet Ormiston, a 19th-century British woman who gained notoriety for cross-dressing. She lived as Ned Davies from 1862 to 1878, primarily working as a sailor, dockworker, and farm labourer, dressing in men's clothing. In later life, she became an alcoholic and was arrested numerous times for crimes. She returned to living as a woman in 1879, after a prison sentence for arson. After being charged with arson for a second time, she reformed and lived in Warrington until her death in 1887. Two different ballads, popular in Lancashire during her lifetime, gave versions of her life-story.

== Early life and family ==
Elizabeth Harriet Davies was born in 1831 in Penketh, Borough of Warrington, Lancashire, England to Eliza (née Stone) and Peter Davies. Peter was a shoemaker and farmer. He and Eliza's children included Rozillah, Mary, (Elizabeth) Harriet, Sarah, John, and Lydia in 1841. (Note: Peter's tombstone includes inscriptions for his wife, his daughter Lydia, and also Edward James Davies, and Ellen Davies.) Davies married Peter Taylor on 25 April 1850 in Farnworth, and they lived in Cuerdley. According to Craig Sherwood, of the Warrington Museum & Art Gallery, her husband worked as a farm labourer and after a brief time they separated after a dispute. She told the court in Warrington during an 1875 arrest, that her husband had been killed around 1854, but in an earlier arrest the same year, she said he was killed in Speke in 1852. She reported to the court that they had a child who died and that her husband had worked as a contractor in Moore prior to his death. She married for the second time with Thomas Boydell (also shown as Boydall and Boydel) on 17 December 1855 at Great Sankey, but was widowed soon after the marriage.

== Career ==
=== Transition period (1856–1862) ===
By 1856, as Lizzie Taylor or Lizzie-poor-Jack, she was wearing men's clothes and working as a miner. She frequently visited fairs, traveling with the United All-England Eleven cricket team, and engaged in Cornish wrestling. In October of that year, she threw the cricketer John Lillywhite in a wrestling match at Clowance. In the early 1860s, she worked as a house keeper using the name Harriet Boydel and lived with her parents. When the American Civil War broke out, the Confederate ship CSS Alabama was commissioned to be built at Birkenhead on the River Mersey. It was intended to capture and destroy commerce ships taking supplies to the Union states of the north. The ship was completed in the spring of 1862 and commanded by captain Raphael Semmes. Sherwood stated that Taylor, using the name Ned Davies, signed up as a sailor aboard the Alabama and made several trips on the vessel before it was destroyed in 1864. This information was also reported in period newspaper reports, but at least one article in the Warrington Evening Post disputed the information.

=== Life as a man (1862–1878) ===
An article which appeared widely in newspapers in England, Australia, and the United States, like the Liverpool Journal of Commerce, Texas Galveston Daily News and Georgia Savannah Morning News, and The Sydney Morning Herald in 1875, reported that Navvy Ned had been a sailor, who was based in South Wales and sailed from there to the United States to supply the Alabama and other blockade-runners with coal. These newspapers reported that when Elizabeth Harriet's husband, who had been a sea captain, died she decided to live solely as a man from 1862. In an 1875 newspaper report from Warrington, Neddie Davies, who was also known as Elizabeth Taylor or Rowntree, told the Warrington magistrate that his service had been on the Bootle, which supplied coal from North Wales to vessels running the American blockade. When the war ended, Ned, who had been living in Liverpool, working as a dock hand, moved to Warrington and began to work in the area as a farm labourer. He broke horses, drove the plough, and assisted in butchering livestock at farms in Penketh, Burtonwood, Winwick and Croft. Newspapers reported that at one farm Ned carried on a love affair for some time with one of the servants, which caused his gender to become known and he was dismissed. On 31 December 1866, at St Helen's Church in Prescot, Elizabeth Harriet Boydell married Andrew Rennie Ormiston (also given as Ormaston). The couple did not live together after their marriage, as Andrew was a sailor and Elizabeth Harriet continued to work as a male farm labourer.

In the 1870s, Ned began to have trouble with alcohol and was arrested numerous times. Each time he appeared before the magistrates as a man, but when questioned he revealed his identity, sometimes stating that he was Elizabeth Taylor, sometimes Eliza Davies, sometimes Harriet Davies, or Harriet Taylor, and other times Harriet Ormiston. After a public commotion arose, when it was discovered that Ned was a woman, he was arrested in Widnes in 1873, and charged with breaching the peace and sentenced to a week in prison. In May 1875, he was arrested and charged with cross-dressing. Because he could not pay the five shilling charge, Ned was sent to gaol for seven days. He was charged with being drunk and disorderly the next month and fined five shillings and court costs. He was arrested in 1876 and charged with drunkenness after being found on the street surrounded by a mob of around a hundred people who were taunting him for cross-dressing. Unable to pay the fines, he was remanded to gaol for a week. Ned was arrested for the same charge in May 1877, when a police officer feared Ned would be killed by a jeering crowd of five hundred people in Horsemarket Street, Warrington. Ned claimed not to be drunk, but said he was agitated. He was released and the charges dismissed. In September newspapers reported that he was found "surrounded by a crowd of a thousand people, who were pelting [him] with stones, and shouting at [him] 'Man-Woman'". The court released him with a caution, upon Ned's promise to reform his behaviour.

Ned faced a more serious charge in 1878, when he was accused of arson. The cottage in which he was living burned to the ground. Neighbours testified that Ned had removed his belongings and said that before he moved out there would be a fire. The local publican stated that Ned had asked him for matches, but was not given any. Ned refuted the charges and said that he had lighted a fire to make tea and suggested the culprit might be a man named Travis who was working in a nearby field. Ned was convicted and sentenced to fifteen months hard labour.

=== Life as a woman (1879–1887) ===
When Ned's prison term was over in October 1879, she resumed the name of Harriet Ormiston. She reunited with her husband and they moved into the home of Harriet's sister, Sarah (née Davies, formerly Young) McLoughlin. The couple lived with Sarah, her husband Edward McLoughlin, and Sarah's children, Joseph and Annie Young, and another daughter at 11 Parr Street, in Parr, St Helens. The couple were known to drink heavily and were violent toward each other. On at least one occasion, Ormiston threatened Andrew with a knife and he hit her, blackening both of her eyes, which required her hospitalisation. In May 1880, Ormiston was accused by her nephew Joseph Young of setting their house on fire by lighting a pile of clothes ablaze with a candle. Ormiston was arrested and held over for trial. Her sister testified that after a night of heavy drinking on 24 April, the couple got into a fight and Ormiston went to her room and continued drinking. Ormiston was angry and before falling asleep had threatened to burn the house down. According to Sarah, Annie Young went to bed around midnight and left a candle burning on the floor, but there were no clothes near the candle. When Joseph prepared to go to bed at half-past twelve, he smelled smoke, saw the clothing on fire, and put the fire out. Sarah then stated that upon going upstairs, her sister said "they did not blaze half bad enough" and she called a constable to arrest Ormiston.

Joseph's testimony was that when he was preparing for bed at twelve thirty on 25 April, he entered the room of Ormiston and her husband. They were asleep, but a lit candle was on the floor, which he blew out. When he entered his sisters' bedroom, he found clothing and bed hangings on fire and grabbed the burning pile, carrying it downstairs where he doused it with water, while yelling "fire" to alert the occupants in the house. Annie testified that she went to bed at ten minutes past midnight, leaving a candle burning on the floor. She said she and her sister left their clothes on a box which was about a yard (approximately 1 metre) away from the candle. Annie said she was awoken a short time later when Ormiston entered her room, carrying a lit candle. Annie told her to leave and Ormiston did so immediately without moving any clothing. Another occupant of the home, Ellen Houlton, was called and testified that in the past Ormiston had threatened to burn the house down. Ormiston denied lighting the blaze and said that when the police came to the house, she believed they were there to take her into protective custody because she had been beaten so badly. They took her to a hospital, where she spent six weeks, and Ormiston said she had no idea she was being charged with a crime at the time. She further said that everyone in the house was drunk, and her sister was trying to protect her children from being charged. Ormiston said Houlton would "say anything for a glass of beer". She was acquitted in July 1880 by the jury for lack of direct evidence, but the judge warned her that because of her prior conviction for arson, any further arson convictions would result in a prison sentence.

Ormiston reformed her ways after the incident, and moved to 3 Wainwrights Yard, in Warrington, where she lived with a female companion. In 1886, she reported to the Warrington Borough Police Court that she had saved up money and earned £1 per week. She was in court having accused Margaret Killala (or Kilalee) of stealing her purse which contained around £4. Ormiston said that she had brought food to Killala, who claimed to be starving and that the woman had then stolen her purse. When asked to identify herself, Ormiston stated, that she had never used her birth name, was never christened, and was called 'Elizabeth Harriet'. When pressed for her surname, Ormiston replied, "It is Urmston now, but it formerly was, in my younger days, Taylor". Although the police searched the accused and the home of Ormiston, the purse was not found. Lacking direct evidence, the Mayor advised that while they believed Killala had taken the money, there was no evidence. He discharged Killala on her own recognisance, but required her to pay a bond of £20 and appear if later called upon.

== Death and legacy ==
Happy Ned died in Warrington in 1887, and his obituary appeared in newspapers from Australia to the United States. He was buried as 'Harriet Ormaston' on 5 September 1887, in St. Mary's Cemetery at Great Sankey, Lancashire County, England. In Ned's lifetime, he gained notoriety for dressing and working as a man, but was always reported to be a woman in media coverage. Despite always acknowledging his various female names, he was most commonly known as Happy Ned. In the twentieth and twenty-first centuries, gender studies scholars like Elisabeth Krimmer and historian Julie Wheelwright have included brief mention of Elizabeth Taylor in books dealing with women who cross-dressed to serve in the military. Wheelwright stated that a ballad "immortalised" Taylor's life story. Two different ballads tell her story and were reprinted in newspapers for decades after her death. One, in which the first two stanzas were printed in 1887 as:

My name was Elizabeth Taylor,
but, bless you, I've long been a man;
I served in the fleet as a sailor
When the war o’ Secession began;

I fought for the North like a good un
Though I wasn't a Yankee myself; (Note: Regardless of whether he served on the Alabama, or supplied it, Ned Davies could not have "fought for the North" as the Alabama was a Confederate raiding vessel and supplying it would have assisted the South.)
And why it all ended so sudden
I'm dash'd if I ever could tell!

and another, which appeared in newspapers in 1887 and 1888:

Peace to the shade of Happy Ned,
Who was by trade a sailor;
She dressed like a man, but she was a maid,
And her name was Betty Taylor.

Hunger and love were the reasons twain
Why she did not pass for a female;
She got rid of them both when she went afloat
In the rig of a jolly sea-male.

The moral of this instructive tale
Is so plain that we all can read it;
But it most concerns the ladies, who
Much more than the men will need it.

When a lady is hungry—alas, the day!—
And the pangs of love assail her,
Her dress-improver she'd better doff,
And go to sea like Bet Taylor.
