= Charlotte Jolles =

Anglo-German literary scholar (1909–2003)

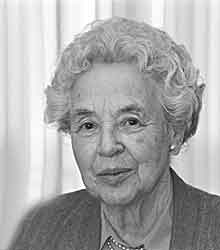
- Born: 5 October 1909; Berlin, German Empire
- Died: 31 December 2003 (aged 94); Camden, London, England

Charlotte Alice Bertha Eva Jolles (5 October 1909 – 31 December 2003) was an Anglo-German literary scholar. She was an enthusiast and expert on the realist writer Theodor Fontane.

== Life ==
Jolles was born in Berlin in 1909 and she was brought up at Grossbeeren Str. 82, Kreuzberg. Jolles wrote a PhD thesis in 1937 which was accepted and never published because the subject matter was not politically acceptable and Jolles was deemed half-Jewish. Her study concerned the German novelist Theodor Fontane. Jolles arrived in London in 1939 on a temporary visa. She worked with the children of refugees before she started teaching German at Watford Girls Grammar School.

Jolles became a British citizen in 1946. In 1955 she was lecturing in German at Birkbeck College and she became a Professor in 1974. Jolles resigned in 1977 as a Professor emeritus to undertake research.

During the Cold War she was able to travel to Potsdam in East Germany as part of her research and she encountered no barriers. She was able to exchange ideas on both sides of the "Iron Curtain". In 1983 her 1936 PhD thesis was rediscovered in Berlin University and it could finally be published and it needed no corrections. In 1990 the Theodor Fontane Society was formed and Jolles became its long term President.

Jolles died in Camden, London in 2003. Her obituary said "Charlotte Jolles did more for the study of Germany's greatest 19th-century novelist, Theodor Fontane, than anyone else in the 20th century". In 2014 a memorial plaque was unveiled on her childhood home.
