= Max Herrmann (theatrologist) =

German theatrologist

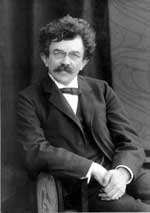
Max Herrmann, ca. 1900

Max Herrmann (14 May 1865 – 17 November 1942) was a German literary historian and theorist of theatre studies. He is considered to be the founding father of theatre studies in Germany.

Born in Berlin into a Jewish family, Herrmann, having passed his A-levels, in 1884 began studying Germanic Philology and History at the Universities of Freiburg, Göttingen and Berlin. In 1891 he became Privatdozent for Germanic Philology at the University of Berlin and in 1898 he married Helene Schlesinger. In 1900 he gave his first lectures on theatre studies at the Department of Germanic Studies in Berlin. In his interpretation and analysis of Johann Wolfgang von Goethe's play Jahrmarktsfest zu Plundersweilern he not only included results based on research of the original sources but also the stage history of the play. After having been appointed professor in 1903 he continued working as a freelance lecturer and contributed to a number of literary societies, such as the Society for Theatre Studies. In 1914 he published his most renowned work "Research on the History of German Theatre in the Middle Ages and the Renaissance" (Forschungen zur deutschen Theatergeschichte des Mittelalters und der Renaissance) in which he further specified his approach. In 1916 he founded the "Library of German Private and Manuscript Prints" (Bibliothek Deutscher Privat- und Manuskriptdrucke) at the Berlin State Library.

Herrmann vehemently advocated for the emancipation of theatre studies from German studies. In 1919 he was offered a chair at the University of Berlin. When, in 1923, the Institute of Theatre Studies, the first institution of its kind in the world, was founded at Berlin University despite much resistance from the more established disciplines, Herrmann was appointed its head, a function he fulfilled alternately with Julius Petersen.

When the Law for the Restoration of the Professional Civil Service was passed in April 1933, Max Herrmann was deprived of his professorship by being forced to go into retirement. On 8 September 1942 he and his wife were deported to the Theresienstadt Ghetto, where he died in November 1942.

Until his deportation Herrmann worked on "The Development of the Professional Art of Theatre in Antiquity and Modern Times" (Die Entstehung der berufsmässigen Schauspielkunst im Altertum und in der Neuzeit) irrespective of institutionlised harassment which meant, for example, that he was only allowed to read books while standing. The manuscript of the book was preserved by a student of Herrmann's, Ruth Mövius, and only published in 1962.

Every year on 10 May, the anniversary of the Nazi book burnings, the Berlin State Library awards the Max Herrmann Prize.

== Works ==
- Forschungen zur deutschen Theatergeschichte des Mittelalters und der Renaissance. Berlin: Weidmannsche Buchhandlung, 1914.
- Die Bühne des Hans Sachs. Ein offener Brief an Albert Köster. Berlin: Weidmannsche Buchhandlung, 1928
- Die Entstehung der berufsmässigen Schauspielkunst im Altertum und in der Neuzeit. Ed. Ruth Mövius. Berlin: Henschel, 1962. online
