= Wolfgang Kayser =

German germanist (1906–1960)

Wolfgang Kayser (born 24 December 1906 in Berlin; died 23 January 1960 in Göttingen) was a German Germanist and scholar of literature.

== Biography ==
Kayser earned his doctorate in 1932 with a thesis on the poetry of Baroque poet Harsdörffer, and his habilitation in 1935, writing about the history of the German ballad. During the Nazi era he showed allegiance to the Nazi Party. In 1933 he joined the SA and in 1937, the NSDAP

In 1938 he became a Privatdozent in Leipzig. In 1941 he was appointed director of the German Cultural Institute in Lisbon, which role he described as that of "an adjunct professor in the Imperial Service." He also held a lectureship in German at the University of Lisbon. During that period he was already at work on what would become his pioneering textbook, Das Sprachliche Kunstwerk: Eine Einführung in die Literaturwissenschaft (The Language of Art: An Introduction to the Literature).

Dismissed from service after 1945, he thereafter worked mainly as a freelance lecturer, author and translator. In 1948 The Language of Art was published, which had a strong influence on post-war German literature. In 1950 he received a professorship at the University of Göttingen, where he worked until his death in 1960.

As German literary studies shook off the control of the politicization that had held sway during the Nazi era, and scholars turned toward increasingly European and multidisciplinary literary scholarship, Kayser gained an international reputation. In 1954 he was made a member of the German Academy for Language and Literature in Darmstadt.

== Writings ==
- Die Klangmalerei bei Harsdörffer (1932, 2. Aufl. 1962)
- Geschichte der deutschen Ballade (1936, 2. Aufl. 1943)
- Vom Rhythmus in deutschen Gedichten. In: Dichtung und Volkstum. Bd. 39 (1938), S. 487–510.
- Bürgerlichkeit und Stammestum in Theodor Storms Novellendichtung, 1938
- Gedichte des deutschen Barock (Auswahl und Nachwort, 1943), Insel-Bücherei 313/2 (weitestgehend kriegsvernichtet; Nachdruck 1989)
- O Problema dos Géneros Literários (1944, Sonderdruck des Deutschen Instituts der Universität Coimbra; Übersetzung aus dem Portugiesischen von Ursula Kayser mit Orlando Grossegesse in Literaturtheorie am Ende? 50 Jahre Wolfgang Kaysers "Sprachliches Kunstwerk". Tübingen/Basel 2001).
- Kleine deutsche Versschule (1946, 25. Aufl. 1995)
- Das sprachliche Kunstwerk. Eine Einführung in die Literaturwissenschaft (1948, 20. Aufl. 1992)
- Entstehung und Krise des deutschen Romans (1955)
- Das Groteske. Seine Gestaltung in Malerei und Dichtung (1957)
- Wilhelm Buschs grotesker Humor (1958), Vortragsreihe der Niedersächsischen Landesregierung, Heft 4 (online).
- Die Vortragsreise. Studien zur Literatur (1958)
- Die Wahrheit der Dichter. Wandlung eines Begriffes in der deutschen Literatur (1958; 1959)
- Deutsche Literatur in unserer Zeit, hrsg. mit Benno von Wiese (1959)

== Publications ==
- Rudolf Walter Leonhardt, Wolfgang Kayser. Er war unentbehrlich und muß nun doch entbehrt werden; in: DIE ZEIT, 29. Januar 1960, Nr. 05.
- Orlando Grossegesse u. Erwin Koller (eds.): Literaturtheorie am Ende? 50 Jahre Wolfgang Kaysers "Sprachliches Kunstwerk". Internationales Kolloquium, Braga 1998. Francke, Tübingen/Basel 2001.
- Ingeborg Ackermann (1977). "Kayser, Wolfgang". Neue Deutsche Biographie (in German). Vol. 11. Berlin: Duncker & Humblot. pp. 384–386. (full text online).

== See also ==
- German studies
- Literary theory
- Denazification
