= Erich Schmidt (historian) =

German historian of literature

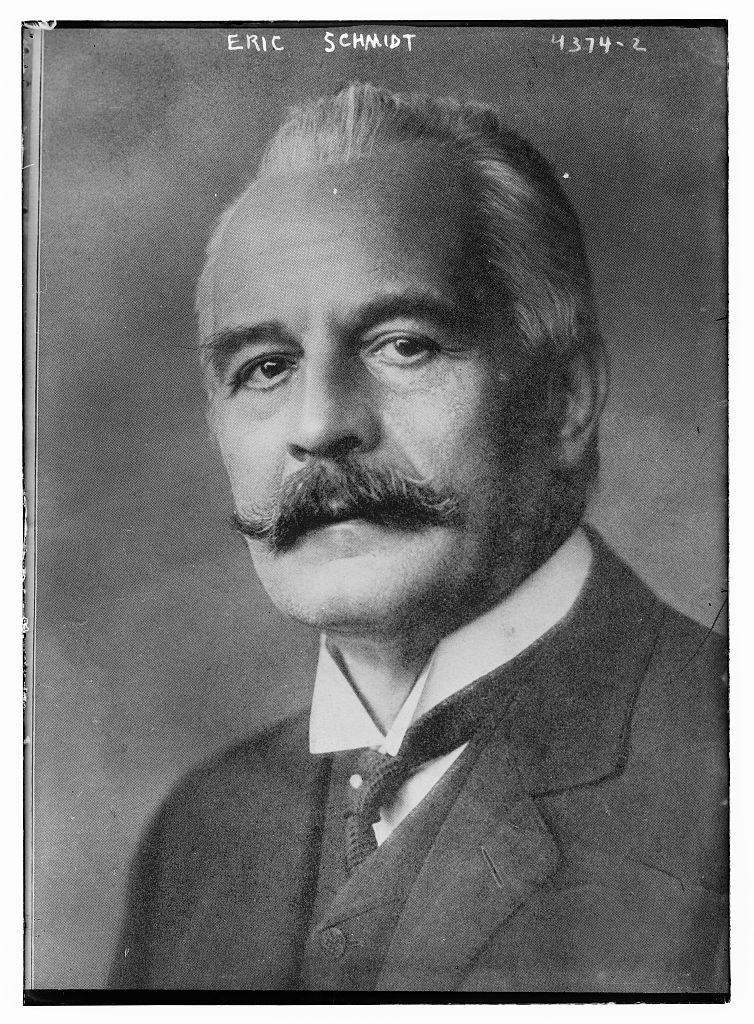
Erich Schmidt (historian)

Erich Schmidt (20 June 1853, in Jena – 29 April 1913, in Berlin) was a German historian of literature.

== Biography ==
He was the son of a zoologist Oskar Schmidt. He studied Germanic philology and literary history at Graz, Jena, and Strassburg, established himself as privatdozent at Würzburg in 1875, became a professor at Strassburg in 1877, at Vienna in 1880, and director of the Goethe archive at Weimar in 1885. Thence he was called to Berlin in 1887, to succeed Wilhelm Scherer in the chair of German language and literature. From 1907 onward, he served as president of the Goethe Society.

== Published works ==
Devoted almost exclusively to the investigation of modern literature, being the distinguished author of works involving writers and German literature of the 18th and 19th century, he published:

- Richardson, Rousseau, und Goethe (1875) – Samuel Richardson, Jean-Jacques Rousseau and Johann Wolfgang von Goethe.
- Lenz und Klinger (1878) – Jakob Michael Reinhold Lenz, Friedrich Maximilian Klinger.
- Heinrich Leopold Wagner (1879) – Heinrich Leopold Wagner.
- Beiträge zur Kenntnis der Klopstockschen Jugendlyrik (1880).
- Komödien vom Studentenleben aus dem sechzehnten und siebzehnten Jahrhundert. Vortrag gehalten auf der Trier Philologenversammlung. Leipzig 1880. (Digitalisat)
- Charakteristiken (1st series 1880; 2d series 1900).
- A biography of Gotthold Ephraim Lessing, titled Lessing: Geschichte seines Lebens und seiner Schriften (2d edition 1899).

He edited:

- Two volumes of the Schriften der Goethe-Gesellschaft (Weimar, 1886 and 1893)
- Faust, for the Weimar edition
- Goethe's Faust in ursprünglicher Gestalt (Goethe's Faust in its original form; 3rd edition, 1894) which was discovered by him in Dresden.
