= Goethe-Gesellschaft =

Organization for the study of Goethe

The Goethe-Gesellschaft (Goethe Society), not to be confused with the Goethe-Institut, is a literary and scientific organisation to explore the literary work of the German poet and writer Johann Wolfgang von Goethe. It was founded in Weimar, where he lived, in 1885 by Charles Alexander, Grand Duke of Saxe-Weimar-Eisenach. It aims at "deeper understanding of Goethe's work and its relevance to the modern world and dedicated research". It publishes a periodical publication, the Goethe-Jahrbuch (Yearbook), first published in 1880 by Ludwig Geiger. The highest award is the Goethe Medal in Gold. (Note: Not to be confused with the Goethe Medal by the Goethe-Institut)

The Goethe Society has approximately 3500 members from 55 countries, approximately 8000 members are organised in 57 local associations. The Goethe Society of North America was founded in 1979. Members are interested amateurs, as well as scientists and institutions. Besides the Goethe Society in Weimar, many other groups are established both at home and abroad. Every two years, a meeting is organised in Weimar for lectures and discussions on Goethe. The present president of the Goethe-Gesellschaft is Jochen Golz.
