= Goethe Society of North America =

The Goethe Society of North America (GSNA) was founded in December 1979 in San Francisco as a non-profit organization dedicated to the encouragement of research on Johann Wolfgang von Goethe (1749–1832) and his age.

The Goethe Society has allied organization status with the Modern Language Association (MLA), the American Society for Eighteenth-Century Studies (ASECS), and the German Studies Association (GSA).

== Book Series and Yearbook ==
The Goethe Society sponsors a book series, "New Studies in the 'Age of Goethe'" published by Bucknell University Press. The book series aims to publish one or two volumes per year, focusing on the “Age of Goethe” in relation to the fields of literature, history (including art history and history of science), philosophy, art, music, or politics.

Since 1982 the Goethe Society has published the Goethe Yearbook, which is composed mainly of research, articles, and an extensive reviews section. The Yearbook aims above all to encourage and publish original English-language contributions to the understanding of Goethe and other authors of the Goethezeit, while also welcoming contributions from scholars around the world. The book review section seeks to evaluate a wide selection of recent publications on the period which has become a respected organ of eighteenth-century studies in diverse disciplines and which is recognized as a vital compendium of current research in its articles and its extensive review section. The Goethe Yearbook is distributed free to all paid-up members of the GSNA
