= Keynes (disambiguation) =

John Maynard Keynes (1883–1946), British economist, founder of modern macroeconomics.

Keynes may refer to the following:

== People with the surname Keynes ==
- John Neville Keynes (1852–1949), British economist and father of John Maynard Keynes
- Milo Keynes (1924–2009), English doctor and author
- Quentin Keynes (1921–2003), British traveller and bibliophile
- Randal Keynes (born 1948), English author
- Richard Darwin Keynes (1919–2010), English physiologist
- Simon Keynes, (born 1952), British author
- Skandar Keynes (born 1991), British actor and political adviser, son of Randal
- Soumaya Keynes (born 1989), British radio actor, daughter of Randal

== Placenames in England containing the name Keynes ==
- Ashton Keynes, a village in Wiltshire
- Coombe Keynes, a hamlet in Dorset
- Horsted Keynes, a village in West Sussex
- Milton Keynes, a city in Buckinghamshire
- Somerford Keynes, a village in Gloucestershire
- Poole Keynes, a village in Gloucestershire.

== Other ==
- Keynesian economics, a school of economic thought based on the ideas of John Maynard Keynes
- Keynes College, Kent, a college of the University of Kent, named after John Maynard Keynes
- John Maynard Keynes, a boat owned by fictional economist Meyer, friend of the John D. MacDonald character Travis McGee
