= Keynes family =

Noted English family

The Keynes family (/ˈkeɪnz/ KAYNZ) is an English family that has included several notable economists, writers, and actors, including the economist John Maynard Keynes.

== Family tree of modern Keynes family ==
Keynes family tree

John Neville Keynes	Florence Ada Brown
Lydia Lopokova	John Maynard Keynes	Geoffrey Langdon Keynes	Margaret Elizabeth Darwin	Margaret Keynes	Archibald Hill
Anne Pinsent Adrian	Richard Darwin Keynes	Quentin Keynes	Milo Keynes	Stephen Keynes	Polly Hill	David Keynes Hill	Maurice Hill
Simon Keynes	Randal Keynes	Zelfa Cecil Hourani	Roger Keynes	Julia Riley
Soumaya Keynes	Skandar Keynes	Laura Keynes

== History ==
The English surname Keynes is derived from a Norman place name, either Cahagnes (Calvados) or Cahaignes (Eure), which are documented as places of origin of people of this name or possibly also from similar placenames not so documented. Both Cahaignes (Eure) and Cahagnes (Calvados) share the same etymology. Cahagnes is mentioned as Kahaniis in 1182-1189 (Actes H II, 750) ; [ecclesia de] Cahannes, [Willelmus de] Cahaines in 1195 (Stapelton 199, 264) ; Kahaignae in 1203. The most probable origin is Late Latin capanna / *cavanna (cauanna, 8th century), same as French cabane (from Occitan) "cabin, hut, shack; shed" and English cabane / cabin, both from French. This etymology is supported by the phonetic evolution in French of common nouns such as tabonem > taon "horsefly, gadfly" or pavonem > paon "peafowl".

The earliest documented person in England bearing the name was William de Cahaignes from Normandy who was born around 1035. Of another Norman William de Cahaignes (born around 1060 and probably his son), Katharine Keats-Rohan writes:- "Norman, from Cahaignes, Calvados, arrondissement Vire, canton Aunay-sur-Odon, although in fact the place in Calvados is called Cahagnes and confused with Cahaignes in the Eure département. Major tenant of Robert, Count of Mortain (half-brother of William the Conqueror) in several Domesday counties. He was Sheriff of Northamptonshire in 1086, and again in the early years of Henry I. His widow Adelicia (Alis, Alice) made a grant for his soul to Lewes priory, with the assent of their son Hugh (Mon. Ang. v,14). His lands were divided between his three sons, of whom Hugh held the forest of Northamptonshire in 1129/30."

=== Variant forms of the surname ===
Surname variants include Koine, De Keynes, Keynes, de Cayenes, Caynes, Caines, Cahaignes. The forms Casneto, Caisned, Casineto, Cheyney, Cheney, Chaney, Chaineis result of a confusion with a place called Chesney (from Late Latin Cassineto "oak grove") cf. modern French chênaie "oak grove".

== Places in England bearing the name Keynes ==
Name "Middelton Keynes", from Plea Rolls of the Court of Common Pleas, 1461

The following places were named after the de Cahaignes, Kaynes or Keynes family who held many manors in the years following the Norman Conquest:

- Ashton Keynes, Wiltshire
- Coombe Keynes, Dorset
- Horsted Keynes, West Sussex
- Milton Keynes, Buckinghamshire (derived from the original Milton Keynes)
- Somerford Keynes, Gloucestershire

== Notable persons surnamed Keynes ==
See Keynes (disambiguation).

== Sources ==
- Keats-Rohan, Katherine S. B. Domesday People: A Prosopography of Persons Occurring in English Documents, 1066–1166. 2v. Woodbridge, Suffolk: Boydell Press, 1999.
