= Maurice Hill (geophysicist) =

British marine geophysicist (1919–1966)

Maurice Hill FRS
- Born: 29 May 1919
- Died: 11 January 1966 (aged 46)
- Education: Highgate School
- Alma mater: University of Cambridge (PhD)
- Children: Julia, 2 other daughters and 2 sons
- Parent(s): Margaret Keynes; Archibald Hill
- Family: Keynes
- Awards: The Chree Medal and Prize (1963); Fellow of the Royal Society

Maurice Neville Hill FRS (29 May 1919 – 11 January 1966) was a British marine geophysicist.

== Background ==
Hill was the son of Nobel Prize–winning physiologist Archibald Hill and his wife Margaret Hill, the daughter of John Neville Keynes and sister of John Maynard Keynes. His sister was Polly Hill and his brother the biophysicist David Keynes Hill.

He was educated at Byron House, Highgate School and King's College, Cambridge, where he took his PhD and was a Fellow from 1949 and Director of Studies in Natural Sciences from 1961. In 1965, he became Reader in Marine Geophysics at the Department of Geodesy and Geophysics at Cambridge.

In 1944, he married Philippa Pass, daughter of Douglas Pass, and they had two sons and three daughters, including Julia Riley and Mark Hill.

== Awards and honours ==
He was elected FRAS in 1951 and FGS in 1953. He was elected a Fellow of the Royal Society in 1962. He was awarded the Charles Chree Medal and Prize in 1963.

== Ancestry ==
Ancestors of Maurice Hill (geophysicist)

Jonathan Hill
Archibald Hill; 1886-1977
Ada Rumney
Maurice Hill; 1919-1966
John Keynes; 1805-1878
John Keynes; 1852-1949
Anna Neville; 1821-1907
Margaret Keynes; 1885-1970
John Brown; 1830-1922
Florence Brown; 1861-1958
Ada Ford; 1837-1929
