= Julia M. Riley =

British astrophysicist

Julia Riley
- Born: Julia Hill; 1947 (age 78–79)
- Parent(s): Maurice Hill; Philippa Pass

Julia M. Riley (née Hill, born 1947) is a British astrophysicist who developed the Fanaroff–Riley classification.

== Personal and professional background ==
She is the daughter of Philippa (Pass) Hill and British marine geophysicist Maurice Hill and granddaughter of Nobel Prize–winning physiologist Archibald Hill. Riley is a Fellow of Girton College associated with the Cavendish Astrophysics Group at University of Cambridge. Her primary field of research is in the area of radio astronomy. Riley lectures and supervises physics within the Natural Sciences Tripos at the University of Cambridge.

== Fanaroff–Riley type I and II ==
In 1974, along with Bernard Fanaroff, she wrote a paper classifying radio galaxies into two types based on their morphology (shape). Fanaroff and Riley's classification became known as Fanaroff–Riley type I and II of radio galaxies (FRI and FRII). In FRI sources the major part of the radio emission comes from closer to the centre of the source, whereas in FRII sources the major part of the emission comes from hotspots set away from the centre (see active galaxies).

== Ancestry ==
Ancestors of Julia M. Riley

Jonathan Hill
Archibald Hill
Ada Rumney
Maurice Hill
John Keynes
Margaret Keynes
Florence Brown
Julia Hill
Philippa Pass
