= Walter Langdon-Brown =

British medical doctor and writer

- Langdon-Brown c. 1940
- Born: 13 August 1870; Bedford, England, British Empire
- Died: 3 October 1946 (aged 76)
- Parent: John Brown

Sir Walter Langdon-Brown (13 August 1870 – 3 October 1946) was a British medical doctor and writer.

== Biography ==
Walter Langdon-Brown was born in Bedford, the son of the Rev. John Brown of Bunyan's Chapel, Bedford, and his wife, Ada Haydon Ford (1837–1929). His mother was a niece of John Langdon Down, describer of Down syndrome. His sister was Florence Ada Keynes, the social reformer, wife of John Neville Keynes and mother of John Maynard Keynes (see Keynes family).

He was educated at Bedford School and St. John's College, Cambridge. He served as an army doctor in the Second Boer War and World War 1. He worked at St Bartholomew's Hospital with Samuel Gee, and later at the Metropolitan Free Hospital, London.

He was the author of a number of medical textbooks, a lecturer at the Royal College of Physicians, and went on to become Regius Professor of Physic at the University of Cambridge. He was knighted on his retirement in 1935.

The Langdon-Brown lectureship at the Royal College of Physicians was founded in his memory in 1950 by a gift from his second wife, Lady Freda Langdon-Brown.

== Selected publications ==
- Langdon-Brown, Walter; University of Leeds (1910). Physiological principles in treatment. London: Baillière, Tindall and Cox. (with J. Keogh Murphy, 1915)
- Langdon-Brown, Walter (1915). Physiological principles in treatment. London: Baillière.
- Langdon-Brown, Walter (1920). The sympathetic nervous system in disease. London: Frowde.
- Evans, G (January 1952). "Inaugural Langdon-Brown Lecture". British Medical Journal. 1 (4751): 175–81. doi:10.1136/bmj.1.4751.175. PMC 2022411. PMID 14896077.
