= Hornsey Housing Trust =

Hornsey Housing Trust was set up in 1933 by Margaret Hill with the purpose of housing people in the Hornsey and Crouch End areas of North London. Since that time, it has grown to become a specialist provider of a range of housing, support and care options for over 400 older people and people with other support needs. Hornsey's focus is within north and east London, building from its base in Haringey. It is a partners involved in delivering the Supporting People strategy in Haringey.

Half of Hornsey's work involves the management of 385 tenancies for older people, spread across Haringey in Hornsey, Crouch End, Harringay, Highgate and Tottenham. Hornsey also provides a range of support services for the majority of those tenants, running floating support and scheme management alongside a housing management and maintenance service tailored for the needs of an older client group. Their support team is well established and one of their latest initiatives is to establish ‘extra-care’ support as part of a scheme to convert two of their schemes into extra care sheltered housing, for frailer tenants. This project is one of seventeen projects from over 200 bidders to gain Department of Health funding to create new extra care provision. Hornsey's focus as an organisation is providing housing-related support to older people to enable them to remain independent for as long as possible.

Hornsey have gained success in running a contract to provide floating support for 140 older and disabled people across the London Borough of Barnet. This project is funded by Barnet's Supporting People programme and is run as a close partnership with the Borough's Social Services department.

Hornsey joined with the Novas Group (later to become People Can and formally declared insolvent in 2012) in creating the 60+ in Haringey service. This service provides floating support for 300 older people across the borough and includes a range of tenure groups – council tenants, housing association tenants, private rented tenants and owner-occupiers. Most recently, 60+ has led in the partnership on establishing working links with Haringey Primary Care Trust to develop a delayed hospital discharge project. This involves providing short-term support to older patients who need additional help in settling back into home life after a hospital stay.

Hornsey's housing management, support and care service operations are dedicated to the needs and aspirations of older tenants.

Three of Hornsey's sheltered schemes are developed and managed for multi-cultural communities, with flats for a range of African, Caribbean, Asian, Chinese, Irish and continental European tenants.

in 2023 Hornsey Housing Trust celebrated its 90th anniversary, planting a tree in Priory Park, Crouch End and publishing the book 'A Place to Call Home: The first 90 years of Hornsey Housing Trust', written by former Trust Chair Rosie Boughton, which was launched at a celebration at Margaret Hill House.
