= David Keynes Hill =

British biophysicist (1915–2002)

David Keynes Hill FRS
- Born: 23 July 1915
- Died: 18 August 2002 (aged 87)
- Occupation: Biophysicist
- Spouse: Stella Humphrey (m. 1949)
- Children: 4
- Parents: A.V. Hill; Margaret Hill
- Family: Keynes

David Keynes Hill FRS (23 July 1915 – 18 August 2002) was a British biophysicist.

Hill was the son of Nobel Prize–winning physiologist Archibald Vivian Hill and his wife Margaret Hill, the daughter of John Neville Keynes and sister of John Maynard Keynes. His sister was economist Polly Hill and his brother the oceanographer Maurice Hill. He was educated at Highgate School and Trinity College, Cambridge.

He married Stella Mary Humphrey in 1949, and they had four daughters.

He was elected a Fellow of the Royal Society in 1972.
