= Polly Hill (economist) =

British social anthropologist

Polly Hill (14 June 1914 – 21 August 2005) was a British social anthropologist of West Africa, and an emeritus Fellow of Clare Hall, Cambridge.

== Life and career ==
Hill came from a family of distinguished academics – her father, A. V. Hill, had earned a Nobel Prize in physiology and her mother Margaret Hill was a leading social reformer. Hill's maternal grandfather was economist John Neville Keynes, and maternal uncles were economist John Maynard Keynes and surgeon Geoffrey Keynes. Her brothers were the physiologist David Keynes Hill and the oceanographer Maurice Hill, while her sister Janet married the immunologist John Herbert Humphrey.

She graduated with a 2:1 in Economics from Newnham College, Cambridge in 1933. In 1938 she was a research assistant at the Fabian Society, publishing a book on British unemployment. Hill spent eleven years (1940–51) as a civil servant in London, in the statistics department of the Colonial Office. She lived for a period during the war in Henry Moore's studio. After an interlude in journalism (1951–53) for the weekly West Africa, she spent nearly eleven more years as a Research Fellow/Senior Research Fellow at the University of Ghana (initially University of the Gold Coast) between 1954 and 1965.

She had an interlude as a Fellow at Cambridge, 1960–61, after which she returned to Ghana and shifted from Economics to the Centre for African Studies as a colleague of Ivor Wilks. In 1963, she published The Migrant Cocoa-Farmers of Southern Ghana, which portrayed and documented the emergence of a class of dynamic indigenous entrepreneurs, who developed as they grew a complex infrastructure that the colonial government could not provide.

Hill left Ghana 1965 as her daughter was at risk from malaria, moving back to Cambridge and became an unpaid research fellow at Clare Hall. She never held a permanent position in the UK. From 1965 to 1973 she did fieldwork in Hausaland in Northern Nigeria supported by small research grants.

In 1967, she received a PhD in social anthropology from the University of Cambridge, supervised by Joan Robinson. It was based on her work on migrant cocoa farmers. She was then appointed as fixed-term Smuts Reader in Commonwealth Studies from 1971 to 1979. In 1976–77, dissatisfied with economic anthropology at Cambridge, she lived in Sri Lanka and India and was able to produce a major comparative study with Nigeria (Hill 1982). She completed her last fieldwork at the age of 67.

Hill published many other influential books, among them Development Economics on Trial (1986). She examined economic aid to developing nations, arguing that aid often went to programmes designed to fit the donor's interests. In her latter years she wrote two books about her family and people of the Fens. She died in her daughter's home in Isleham, Cambridgeshire after three years with senile dementia.

== Honours ==
Honorary doctorate, School of Oriental and African Studies, University of London, 1996.

== Main publications ==
- Hill, Polly. Two Sleepwalkers: Not an Autobiography. Poems. Date unknown.
- Hill, Polly. 1992. Who were the Fen People? Proceedings of the Cambridge Antiquarian Society Volume LXXXI
- Hill, Polly. 1992. Fante villages in southern Ghana : migration and the 'hopelessness' of food farming. Cambridge : African Studies Centre, University of Cambridge.
- Hill, Polly. 1990. The History of the Isleham Fen in the 1930s. privately published.
- Hill, Polly and Richard Keynes (ed.). 1989. Lydia and Maynard: letters between Lydia Lopokova and John Maynard Keynes. London : Andrâe Deutsch. (reprint 1992, Papermac)
- Hill, Polly. 1986. Development economics on trial: the anthropological case for a prosecution. Cambridge: Cambridge University Press 0521271029
- Hill, Polly. 1986. Talking with Ewe seine fishermen and shallot farmers. Recording and editing by Polly Hill. Cambridge: African Studies Centre, University of Cambridge. Cambridge African monographs v6
- Hill, Polly. 1984. Indigenous trade and market places in Ghana 1962-64. material collected and edited by Polly Hill. Jos :Department of History, University of Jos
- Hill, Polly. 1982. Dry grain farming families: Hausaland (Nigeria) and Karnataka (India) compared. Cambridge: Cambridge University Press
- Hill, Polly. 1977. Population, prosperity, and poverty : rural Kano, 1900 and 1970. Cambridge: Cambridge University Press
- Hill, Polly. 1972. Rural Hausa: a village and a setting. Cambridge: Cambridge University Press (Study with special reference to the village of Batagarawa)
- Hill, Polly. 1970. The occupations of migrants in Ghana. Ann Arbor : University of Michigan. Museum of Anthropology. Anthropological papers, no. 42
- Hill, Polly. 1970. Studies in rural capitalism in West Africa. Cambridge : Cambridge University Press
- Hill, Polly. 1963. The migrant cocoa-farmers of southern Ghana: a study in rural capitalism. Cambridge : Cambridge University Press
- Hill, Polly. 1956. The Gold Coast cocoa farmer : preliminary survey. London : Oxford University Press 9889002495X
- Hill, Polly. 1940. The unemployment services: a report prepared for the Fabian Society. London: Routledge & sons.

Bibliography: In Cambridge Anthropology journal, Vol 26, No 1 2006
