= Northern Ireland Housing Executive =

Housing agency in Northern Ireland

Agency overview
- Formed: 25 February 1971
- Jurisdiction: Northern Ireland
- Headquarters: Belfast; 54°35′45″N 5°55′43″W
- Employees: 2,933 (2022/23)
- Agency executives: Nicole Lappin, Chair; Catherine McFarland, Interim Chief Executive
- Website: www.nihe.gov.uk

The Northern Ireland Housing Executive is the public housing authority for Northern Ireland. It is Northern Ireland's largest social housing landlord, and the enforcing authority for those parts of housing orders that involve houses with multiple occupants, houses that are unfit, and housing conditions. The NIHE employed 2,933 persons as of 31 March 23.

== Functions and responsibilities ==
The Northern Ireland Housing Executive's website cites its main functions as being:

- to regularly examine housing conditions and housing requirements;
- to draw up wide-ranging programmes to meet these needs;
- to effect the closure, demolition and clearance of unfit houses;
- to effect the improvement of the condition of the housing stock;
- to encourage the provision of new houses;
- to establish housing information and advisory services;
- to consult with district councils and the Northern Ireland Housing Council;
- to manage its own housing stock in Northern Ireland

The organisation is also the home energy conservation authority for Northern Ireland. It has statutory responsibility for homelessness and also administers the housing benefit system and Supporting People programme in Northern Ireland.

== History ==
=== Background ===
Prior to the establishment of the Housing Executive, public housing in Northern Ireland was managed primarily by local councils. Only ratepayers and their spouses could vote in council elections - sub-tenants, lodgers, and adults living with their parents could not - so allocation of housing was "distorted for political ends". This largely took the form of discrimination against Catholics to ensure Unionist control of councils, opposition to which was a major plank of the Northern Ireland civil rights movement of the late 1960s. Following civil disturbances in 1968–69, a commission appointed by the Northern Ireland government and led by Lord Cameron found that "grievances concerning housing were the first general cause of the disorders which it investigated". Lord Cameron's report concluded:

A rising sense of continuing injustice and grievance among large sections of the Catholic population in Northern Ireland, in particular in Derry and Dungannon, in respect of (i) inadequacy of housing provision by certain local authorities (ii) unfair methods of allocation of houses built and let by such authorities, in particular; refusals and omissions to adopt a 'points' system in determining priorities and making allocations (iii) misuse in certain cases of discretionary powers of allocation of houses in order to perpetuate Unionist control of the local authority

=== Establishment ===
Housing Executive Act (Northern Ireland) 1971
- Act of Parliament
- Parliament of Northern Ireland
- Long title: An Act to establish a Northern Ireland Housing Executive and Northern Ireland Housing Council, and to make further provisions with respect to housing.
- Citation: 1971 c. 5 (N.I.)
- Territorial extent: Northern Ireland

Dates
- Royal assent: 25 February 1971

Other legislation
- Amended by: Northern Ireland Assembly Disqualification Act 1975

The Housing Executive was established by the Housing Executive Act (Northern Ireland) 1971 (c. 5 (N.I.)). A single all-purpose housing authority for Northern Ireland had been advocated as early as 1964 by the Northern Ireland Labour Party but it was not until the British Home Secretary, James Callaghan, visited the Stormont Government in the wake of the Belfast Riots of August 1969 and pressed for a unified housing body that the Stormont regime took the idea seriously. Although the Bill was proposed by the Ulster Unionist Minister of Development, Brian Faulkner, it was strongly opposed by Unionist right-wingers and by followers of Ian Paisley.

The new organisation took on the functions and staff of the Northern Ireland Housing Trust in 1971, the housing functions and staff of 61 local authorities in 1972, and the housing functions of the New Town Development Commissions for Derry, Antrim, Ballymena, and Craigavon in 1973. It became the landlord of more than 150,000 dwellings, and introduced a points-based policy intended to ensure impartiality in allocations. However, despite efforts to encourage integrated housing, sectarianism persists, and as of 2011 90% of all Housing Executive estates are predominantly one religious identity.

A House Condition Survey in 1974 found that Northern Ireland had the worst housing conditions in the UK, with almost 20% of houses unfit for human habitation. The Housing Executive embarked on a programme of house building, seeing over 80,000 new houses built between 1975 and 1996. It moved away from the high-rise buildings commonly constructed in the 1960s, concentrating on two- and three-storey houses. It introduced a renovation grants scheme in 1976, enabling privately owned houses to be improved. A second House Condition Survey carried out in 1979 found that unfitness had fallen to 14%. A third survey in 1984 saw it further reduced to 8.4%. By 2011 it was 2.4%.

A right to buy policy, allowing tenants to buy their homes at discounted prices, was introduced in 1979. Derelict houses were sold on the open market, for prices as low as £100, accompanied by loans and grants to help buyers renovate them. The Housing Executive piloted a joint ownership scheme, which led to the foundation of the Northern Ireland Co-Ownership Housing Association.

In 1991 the Housing Executive owned 170,000 dwellings in Northern Ireland. By 2016, the housing stock had reduced to less than 90,000. The Housing Executive stopped building new homes in 2002, this function being taken over by housing associations.

=== Scandals and public scrutiny ===
A commission led by Judge Robin Rowland QC was established in 1977 to investigate Housing Executive contracts. It reported in 1979, finding that public money had ended up in the hands of front organisations for the IRA. In the 1980s, the Executive was scrutinised by the Public Accounts Committee for irregularities in public liability claims and district heating.

=== Proposals ===
A report published in June 2010 by Queens University Belfast stated that social housing in Northern Ireland was not adequately funded. In 2016 it was estimated that the Housing Executive's existing housing stock needed £7bn investment over the next 30 years.

In 2013 the DUP's Nelson McCausland, then Social Development minister in the Northern Ireland Executive, announced a plan to break up the Housing Executive, retaining its strategic function in the public sector and transferring its landlord responsibilities to housing associations. McCausland left the Department of Social Development in 2014, and his proposals were not put into action by his successors. In November 2020 the Communities Minister, Sinn Féin's Carál Ní Chuilín announced plans to allow the Housing Executive to borrow to invest in its housing stock.

== See also ==
- Red Sky scandal
