= Stephen Keynes =

Member of the Darwin family (1927–2017)

Stephen John Keynes OBE FLS (19 October 1927 – 13 August 2017) was a great-grandson of Charles Darwin, and chairman of the Charles Darwin Trust.

He was educated at The Hall School, Hampstead, Oundle School, and King's College, Cambridge, where he was an Open Scholar.

Keynes was the fourth son of Geoffrey Keynes and his wife Margaret Darwin, daughter of Sir George Darwin; he was also a nephew of the economist John Maynard Keynes. His brothers were Richard, Quentin and Milo. In 1955 he married Mary Cecilia Knatchbull-Hugessen, daughter of the Canadian senator Adrian Knatchbull-Hugessen. They had the following children:

- Gregory Robert Edward Keynes (born 3 June 1956)
- Elizabeth Harriet Keynes (born 15 December 1957)
- Toby William Keynes (born 2 November 1959)
- Martha Paganel Keynes (born 25 April 1961)
- Zachary Edmund Keynes (born 18 October 1962)

Keynes was a Fellow of the Linnean Society of London and a member of the Roxburghe Club.

== See also ==
- Keynes family
