= Bernard L. Fanaroff =

South African astronomer and trade unionist

Bernie Fanaroff FRS
- Born: Bernard Lewis Fanaroff; 1947 (age 78–79); Johannesburg, South Africa
- Education: University of the Witwatersrand (BSc); University of Cambridge (PhD)
- Known for: Fanaroff–Riley classification
- Spouse: Wendy Vogel
- Scientific career
- Fields: Radio astronomy
- Workplaces: Square Kilometre Array
- Thesis: Cosmological Information from Radio Source Spectra (1974)

Bernard Lewis Fanaroff FRS (born 1947) is a South African astronomer and trade unionist. He served in several positions in the South African government from 1994 to 2000 related to the Reconstruction and Development Programme, the RDP, and to Safety and Security.From 2003 to 2015 he led South Africa's bid to host the Square Kilometre Array Radio Telescope, the SKA, in Africa and the design and construction of the MeerKAT radio telescope. He is the co-developer of the Fanaroff–Riley classification, a method of classifying radio galaxies. He was the Project Director of South Africa's Square Kilometre Array bid.

== Education and early life ==
Fanaroff was born in Johannesburg, South Africa, to parents of Latvian and Lithuanian Jewish origins, and attended Northview High School. He completed a BSc.Hons (Physics) in 1970 at the University of the Witwatersrand (WITS) and a PhD in Radio Astronomy from the University of Cambridge in 1974. While working on his PhD and in collaboration with British astronomer Julia Riley, he developed the Fanaroff–Riley classification of radio galaxies, based on their radio luminosity and emission morphology.

== Career and research ==
After completing his PhD, Fanaroff returned to South Africa and lectured in Astronomy at WITS for two years. He resigned from the university at the end of 1976 to work as an organizer for the Metal and Allied Workers Union. He served as an organiser of MAWU, which later amalgamated with other unions to become the National Union of Metalworkers of South Africa and served NUMSA as a national secretary from 1987 to 1994. He joined the government as a Deputy Director-General in the Office of President Nelson Mandela from 1994 to 1999. He served as head of the Office for the Reconstruction and Development Programme; Deputy director-general of the Department of Safety and Security (1997-2000); Chair of the integrated Justice System Board and Steering Committee for Border Control. In May 2010 he was appointed a Non-executive director of Eskom.

In 2003 Fanaroff was appointed the Project Director of South Africa's Square Kilometre Array (SKA) bid, a position he held until his retirement in 2015, although he still continued on in an advisory capacity. Early on Fanaroff realised that the Karoo region in which the SKA is to be located has a shortage of qualified teachers for mathematics and science. To overcome this problem and to supply the project with future skilled South African scientists, engineers and artisans Fanaroff and his colleagues established an artisan training centre in the Karoo and instituted a programme to bring qualified teachers to the local schools, as part of a much larger Human Capital Development programme to train students from South Africa and the rest of Africa from undergraduate to post-doctoral level.

In 2020 Fanaroff was appointed the chairman of the board of directors of Karoo Biosciences, a company co-founded in 2019 by Jack Lewis and Omar Burjaqby.

=== Honours and awards ===
- 2012 Ambassador of the Year by the Cape Chamber of Business and Die Burger
- 2013 The Order of Mapungubwe: Silver
- 2017 Karl G. Jansky Lectureship for "exceptional contributions to radio astronomy and his unparalleled leadership through public service..." and in particular for his work with the South African Square Kilometer Array Radio Telescope Project (SKA).
- 2017 Science for Society Gold Medal from the Academy of Science of South Africa
- 2018 Lifetime achievement award by the National Research Foundation
- 2019 Elected a Fellow of the Royal Society (FRS)
- 2022 Elected to the American Philosophical Society
- Visiting professor in physics at the University of Oxford
- Fellow of the Royal Astronomical Society
- Member of the International Astronomical Union
- Founder member of the Academy of Science of South Africa
- Board member of the South African National Biodiversity Institute
- Honorary doctorates from seven South African Universities, including Rhodes University, the University of Cape Town (UCT) and the University of KwaZulu-Natal (UKZN)
