= Cahagnes =

- Commune
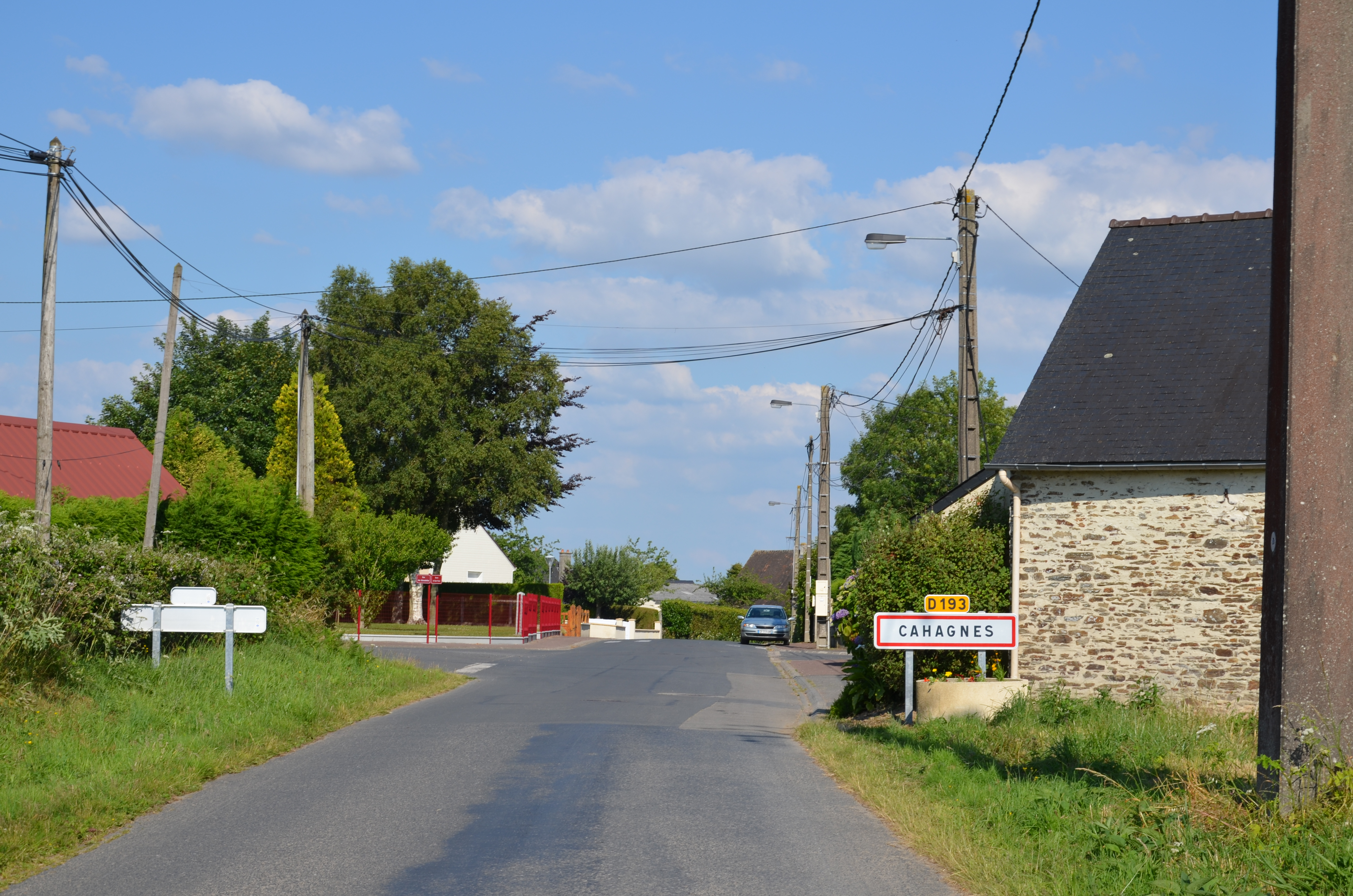
- The road into Cahagnes

- Coat of arms
- Location of Cahagnes
- Location within France Location within Normandy
- Coordinates: 49°04′01″N 0°46′03″W
- Country: France
- Region: Normandy
- Department: Calvados
- Arrondissement: Vire
- Canton: Les Monts d'Aunay
- Intercommunality: Pré-Bocage Intercom

Government
  - Mayor (2020–2026): Guillaume Dujardin
- Area^{1}: 24.35 km^{2} (9.40 sq mi)
- Elevation: 190 m (620 ft)
- Highest elevation: 268 m (879 ft)
- Lowest elevation: 97 m (318 ft)
- Population (2023): 1,405
  - Density: 57.70/km^{2} (149.4/sq mi)
- Time zone: UTC+01:00 (CET)
  - Summer (DST): UTC+02:00 (CEST)
- INSEE/Postal code: 14120 /14240
- ^{1} French Land Register data, which excludes lakes, ponds, glaciers > 1 km^{2} (0.386 sq mi or 247 acres) and river estuaries.

Cahagnes (French pronunciation: [ka.aɲ]) is a commune in the Calvados department in the Normandy region in northwestern France.

== Population ==
Historical population
Year	Pop.	±% p.a.
1968	1,005	—
1975	902	−1.53%
1982	945	+0.67%
1990	934	−0.15%
1999	1,065	+1.47%
2007	1,291	+2.43%
2012	1,386	+1.43%
2017	1,394	+0.12%
2023	1,405	+0.13%
Source: INSEE

== International relations ==
Cahagnes is twinned with:

- Horsted Keynes, UK since 1971.
- Mömbris, Germany since 1989 (Mömbris is more precisely twinned with the Pré-Bocage, a grouping of towns of which Cahagne is one).

== See also ==
- Keynes Family
- Communes of the Calvados department
