= Holy Rood Church, Coombe Keynes =

Church in Dorset, England

Holy Rood Church
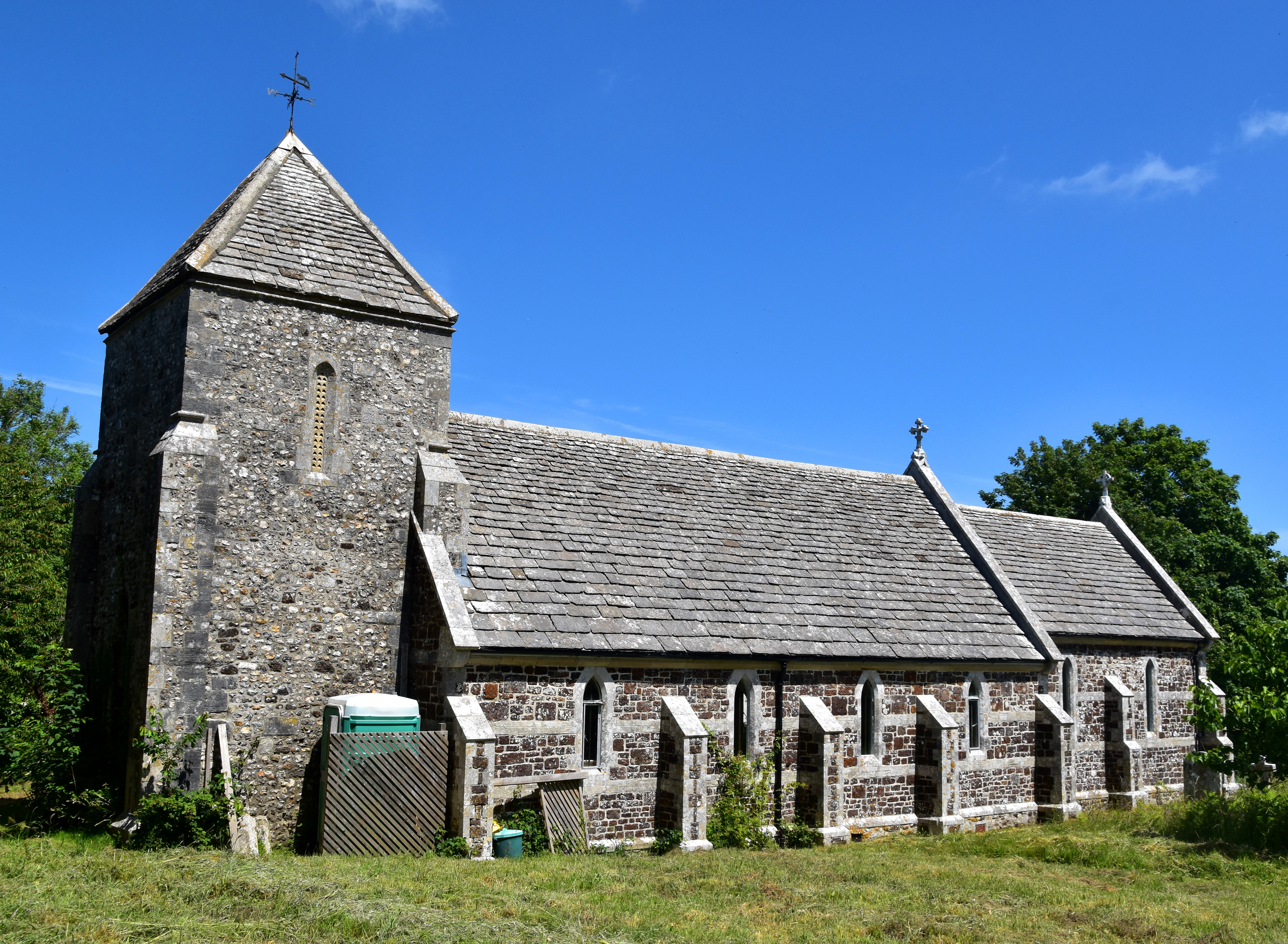

Religion
- Affiliation: Church of England

Location
- Location: Coombe Keynes, Dorset, England
- Interactive map of Holy Rood Church
- Coordinates: 50.6563°N 2.2239°W

Architecture
- Architect: John Hicks
- Type: Church
- Style: Early English

Holy Rood Church is a former Church of England church in Coombe Keynes, Dorset, England. Most of the church dates to a rebuild of 1860–61, but the tower and chancel arch is 13th-century. It was declared redundant in 1974 and is now under the care of a charitable trust. The former church is a Grade II listed building.

== History ==
The original Holy Rood Church was of Early English style and made up of a nave, chancel, south aisle, north porch and west tower. By the mid-19th century, the church had fallen into a dilapidated state, including suffering from damp and the encroachment of ivy. The three bells from the tower had also been placed in the unused south aisle, along with the remains of the broken stocks and wheels which had been used to hang them. The south aisle itself no longer had any flooring or seating. The church's poor condition had long been a concern to the clergy and a committee was formed around 1858 by the Rural dean, Rev. Prebendary Bond, to determine a solution. The new vicar, Rev. F. Newington, would also devote himself to the cause on his arrival to the parish in 1860.

In 1858, the diocesan architect reported on the church, "I have never seen a sadder case than this of ecclesiastical dilapidation and difficulty. A portion of the church is a complete ruin and the rest little better." The church was considered unfit for use and a risk to the minister and congregation. The diocesan architect drew up plans for a major restoration scheme but this was deemed too costly and by the end of 1858, the committee opted for Rev. Bond's proposal to have the church rebuilt. Joseph Weld, the lord of the manor and chief landowner, requested the church's tower be retained.

Plans for the rebuilt church were drawn up by John Hicks of Dorchester. As the 80 sittings (58 of which were free) of the existing church was considered inadequate for the local population of over 150, the new church was designed to accommodate 100 adults and 24 children, with 102 seats being free and unappropriated. The rebuilding was expected to cost an estimated £650.

Owing to the largely poor inhabitants of the parish, subscriptions were sought from further afield. The majority of required capital (£427) was received from clergy and gentry in the surrounding area, while £100 was raised within the parish from a church rate contributed by eight ratepayers. The Salisbury Diocesan Church Building Association and Incorporated Society each granted £50 towards the cost, and with an additional £35 in voluntary subscriptions, a total of £662 was raised.

On 30 April 1860, tenders were sought for repairing and partially rebuilding the church. The builder John Wellspring of Dorchester was hired and work commenced that year. The entire church was rebuilt with the exception of the tower, while some parts of the old church were retained where possible, including several reinserted windows. The westernmost arch of the arcade which separated the nave from the south aisle was cleaned, restored and reinserted to form the chancel arch, and the old high pews were replaced with low open benches. In order to avoid the old church's damp issue, the floor of the rebuilt church was raised and the ground on its south side was cleared. As part of the tower's restoration, buttresses and a pyramidal roof were added, and its three bells rehung. The church was consecrated by the Bishop of Salisbury, the Right Rev. Walter Kerr Hamilton, on 24 August 1861.

During the mid 20th-century, Holy Rood gradually fell into a state of disrepair. In a survey of c. 1966, it was recorded that the church "walls are green with damp, and the plaster is falling from the roof". Meanwhile, congregation numbers continued to fall, with services into the early 1970s often only attended by several people. In 1967, Holy Rood in Wool became the area's new parish church, serving Wool, East Stoke, East Burton and Coombe Keynes. Holy Rood in Coombe Keynes was declared redundant by the Church of England on 15 January 1974.

With the church's closure, the inhabitants of Coombe Keynes expressed interest in acquiring the church for community use. In 1978, a committee was formed within the village to raise funds in the hope of purchasing the building. In 1980, the Coombe Keynes Trust was formed, presided by Sir Joseph William Weld, with the key objective of "promot[ing] the restoration and permanent preservation" of the church for the public. On 28 July 1980, the Church Commissioners came to an agreement with the Trust and sold the church to them for a nominal sum. The church, minus the churchyard, is now in the care of the Trust. It is currently used as a function space for residents and members of the Trust.

== Architecture ==
Holy Rood is built of carstone, limestone rubble and knapped flint, with limestone dressings and stone slate-covered roofs. It is made up of a nave, chancel, north porch and west tower with a vestry formed in its base. The two-stage tower has been dated to the 13th century, as has the reinserted chancel arch. Internally, the church's pine roof is made up of arch-braced trusses with stone corbels.

The nave and chancel contain lancet windows of 13th-century style, and much of the flooring is of Purbeck stone. The floor of the sacrarium is laid with Poole tiles. The nave has a number of 18th-century floor-slabs, including to Jane (the wife of Samuel Serrell), dated 1719, Samuel Serrell, dated 1722, Mary Allner, dated 1729, Elizabeth Bewnel, dated 1753, Anna Allner (wife of James Bewnel), dated 1755, Mary Bewnel, dated 1755, James Bewnel, dated 1755/56, Anna Bewnel, dated 1787, Ann Joyce, dated 1787, and Martha (wife of Thomas Robinson), dated 1787.

=== Fittings ===
Most furnishings have since been removed. The church's pulpit of Bath stone, communion table, prayer desk and lectern were all contemporary fittings with the 1860–61 work. The old church's font, dating to the 13th-century, was repaired and retained. Rev. Newington and his wife produced a number of illuminated scrolls for the church. Mrs. Newington also made the original drapery for the altar and cushions for the sacrarium steps and sedilia. The two small windows on each side of the chancel had painted glass executed by Rev. Newington. They were the victims of vandalism in 1975 and the remnants are now in possession of Wool's vicar. In 1936, a window was added in memory of the church organist Ethel Kate Ford. It has since been relocated to Holy Rood Church in Wool.

The church was in possession of a notable and rare English chalice of c. 1500, which is made of silver, parcel-gilt. It has a rounded bowl, hexagonal stem, and a hexagonal knop and flared base. It has been suggested the chalice came from Bindon Abbey and was taken to Coombe Keynes during the Dissolution of the Monasteries. The chalice was loaned to the Victoria and Albert Museum in London in 1930 and a replica used in its place. In recent years, the chalice was returned to the parochial church council of Wool and East Stoke, and is now on loan to the Dorset Museum.

The church's three bells are now in the possession of the Dorset Museum. The earliest is dated 1350 and was made by Thomas Hey, the second by John Wallis, dated 1599, and the third by Anthony Bond, dated 1636.
