= Horsted Keynes =

Village and parish in West Sussex, England

Coordinates: 51.0346°N 0.0267°W

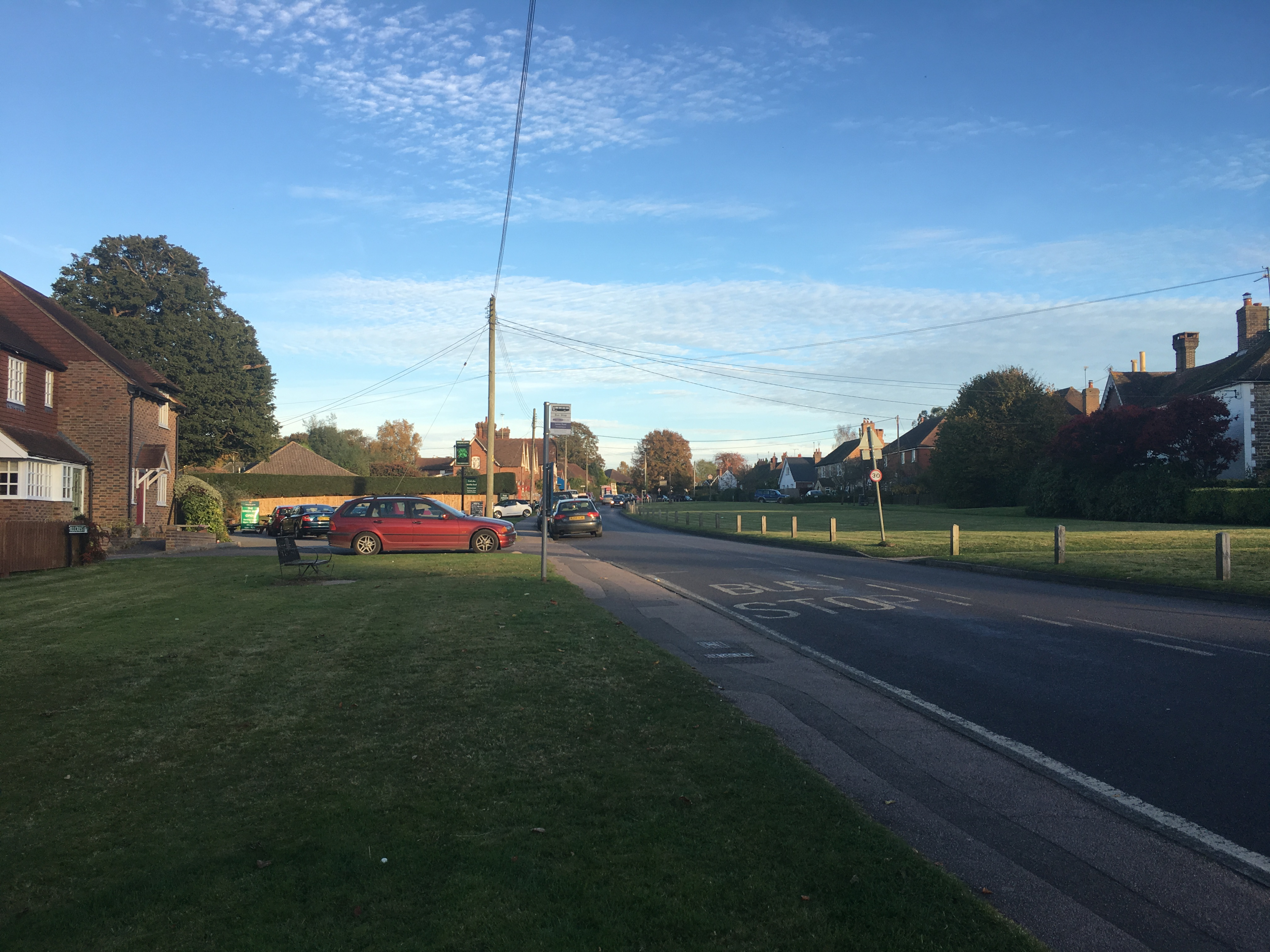

- Location within West Sussex
- Area: 15.81 km^{2} (6.10 sq mi)
- Population: 1,586 2011 Census
  - Density: 95/km^{2} (250/sq mi)
- OS grid reference: TQ387278
  - London: 32 miles (51 km) N
- Civil parish: Horsted Keynes
- District: Mid Sussex
- Shire county: West Sussex
- Region: South East
- Country: England
- Sovereign state: United Kingdom
- Post town: HAYWARDS HEATH
- Postcode district: RH17
- Dialling code: 01825
- Police: Sussex
- Fire: West Sussex
- Ambulance: South East Coast
- UK Parliament: East Grinstead and Uckfield
- Website: http://www.horstedkeynes.com/

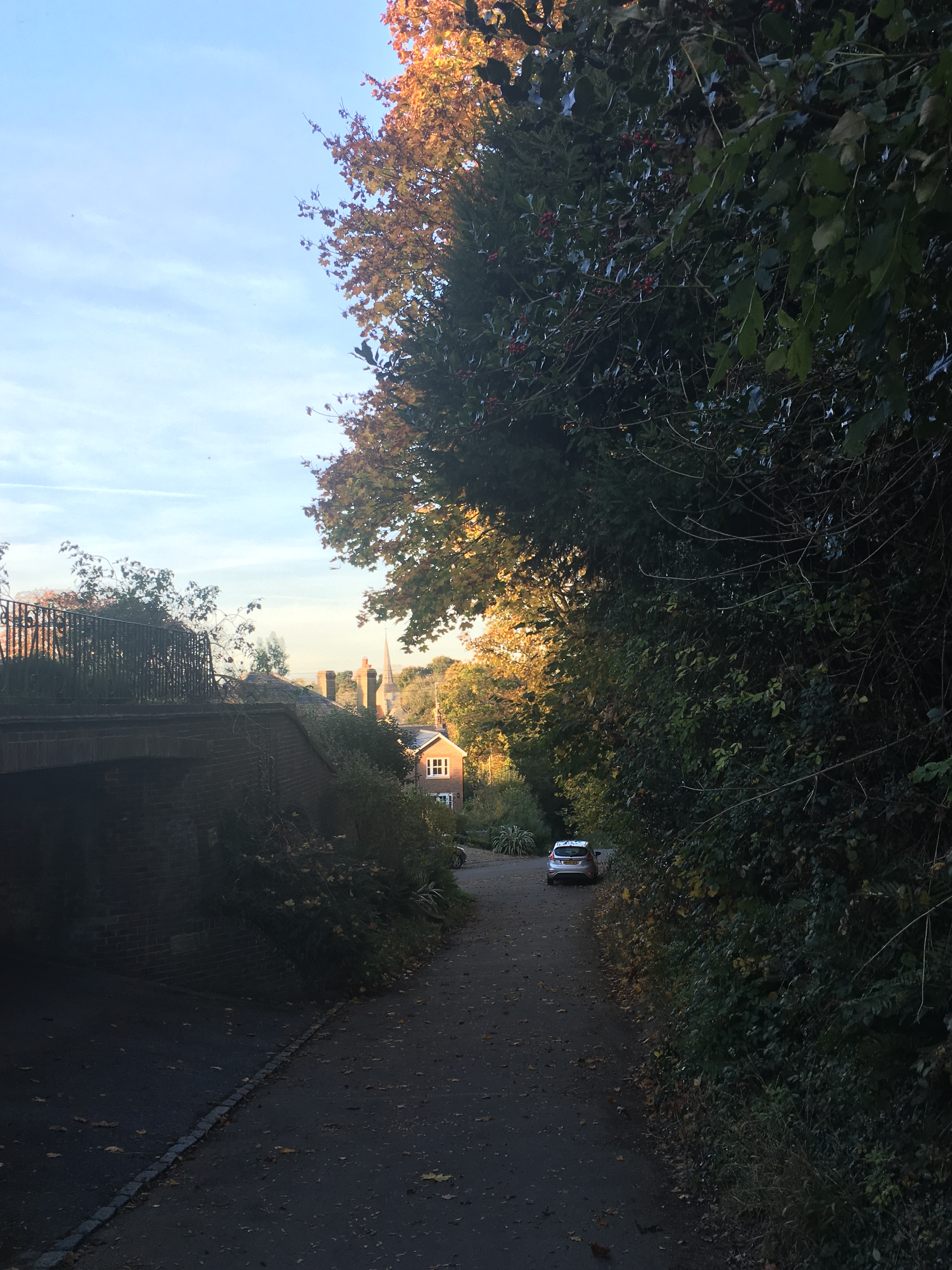
View of the St Giles' Church, Horsted Keynes from the main road.

Horsted Keynes /keɪnz/ KAYNZ is a village and civil parish in the Mid Sussex District of West Sussex, England. The village is about 5 miles (8 km) north east of Haywards Heath, in the Weald. The civil parish is largely rural, covering 1,581 hectares (3,910 acres). At the 2011 census, it had a population of 1,586, increased from 1,507 in 2001. The 0° meridian passes about 1 mile to the east of the village of Horsted Keynes.

== Origin and history ==
Willelmus de Cahaines, a Norman knight who participated in the conquest of England, and lord of what is now Cahagnes (Bessin), was given Middletone (Buckinghamshire) and the Sussex village of Horstede (The Place of Horses in Old English). The latter became Horstede de Cahaignes and in time Horsted Keynes. The place name is first attested in the Domesday Book of 1086. The village has been formally twinned with the Normandy village of Cahagnes since 1971. The Horsted Cahagnes Society promotes social and cultural links, and organises annual exchange visits between the two places.

On Saturday, 28 August 1624, Horsted Keynes hosted what is believed to be the earliest known organised cricket match in Sussex. Knowledge of it stems from the death thirteen days later of Jasper Vinall, on whom an inquest was held. He had suffered a head injury during the game when accidentally hit by a cricket bat.

Two months before being assassinated, U.S. President John F. Kennedy slept in the parish when he stayed one Saturday night at Birch Grove, the home of the former Prime Minister Harold Macmillan. The American Secret Service closed the village that night, siting their communication hub in the Lounge Bar of The Crown Inn.

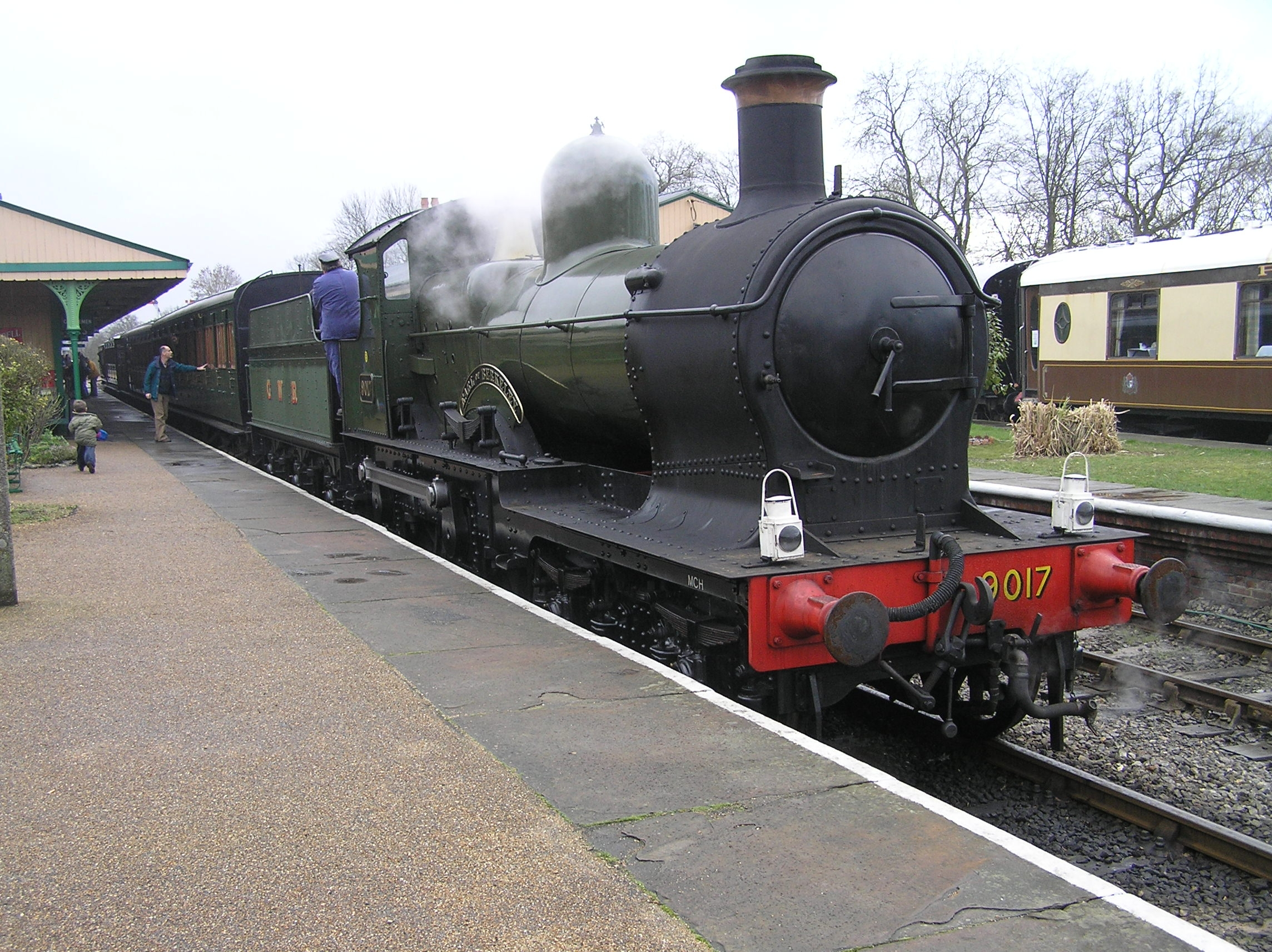
GWR 4-4-0 Dukedog Earl of Berkeley at Horsted Keynes Station on the Bluebell Railway

This part of Sussex was known for its iron industry long before the Industrial Revolution and the coming of the railways. Little remains of this now, except for the hammer ponds and other traces of this activity dotted around the surrounding countryside, although iron working is remembered in many local place names.

== Amenities ==
Horsted Keynes is centred on a village green with pubs, Post Office and village store. The Post Office was to be closed down for lack of use but was bought up by a group of villagers who invested in its continued use for the community. It now serves a large rural area.

Like many other English villages Horsted Keynes is losing businesses that have been there for many years. After the closure of the main village store in 1992, and the more recent loss of the butcher, village hairdresser and photographer, the village garage closed down in June 2007. It was only 20 years ago that the village had two garages, but now it has none, leaving the nearest petrol retailer more than 6 miles (10 km) away. Planning permission was granted and the garage site has now been turned into residential accommodation.

== Churches ==
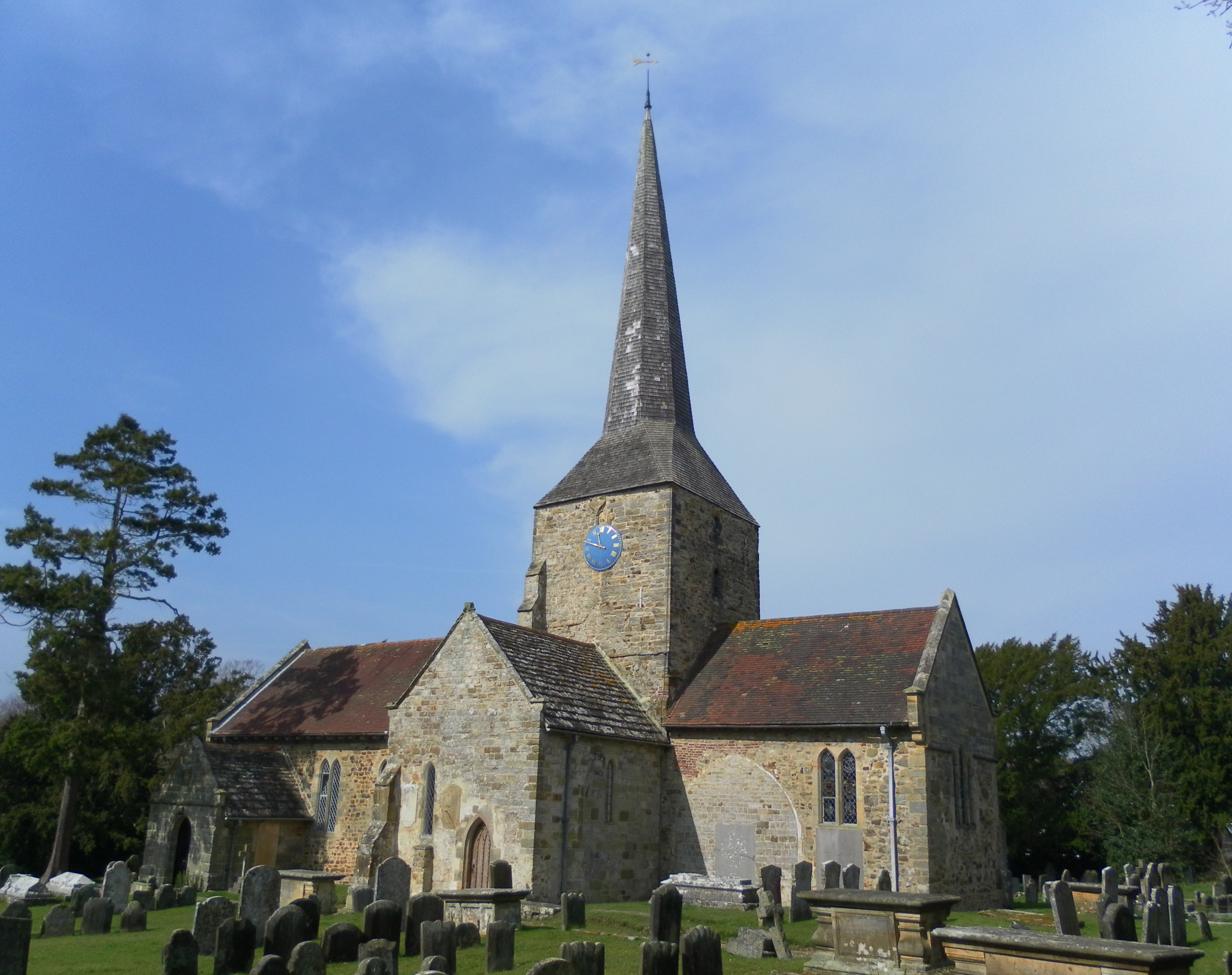
St Giles' Church, Horsted Keynes

The two principal churches are: the Anglican Parish Church dedicated to St Giles and the Roman Catholic church of St Stephen which is unoccupied and controlled from the nearest town, Haywards Heath.

== Railway station ==
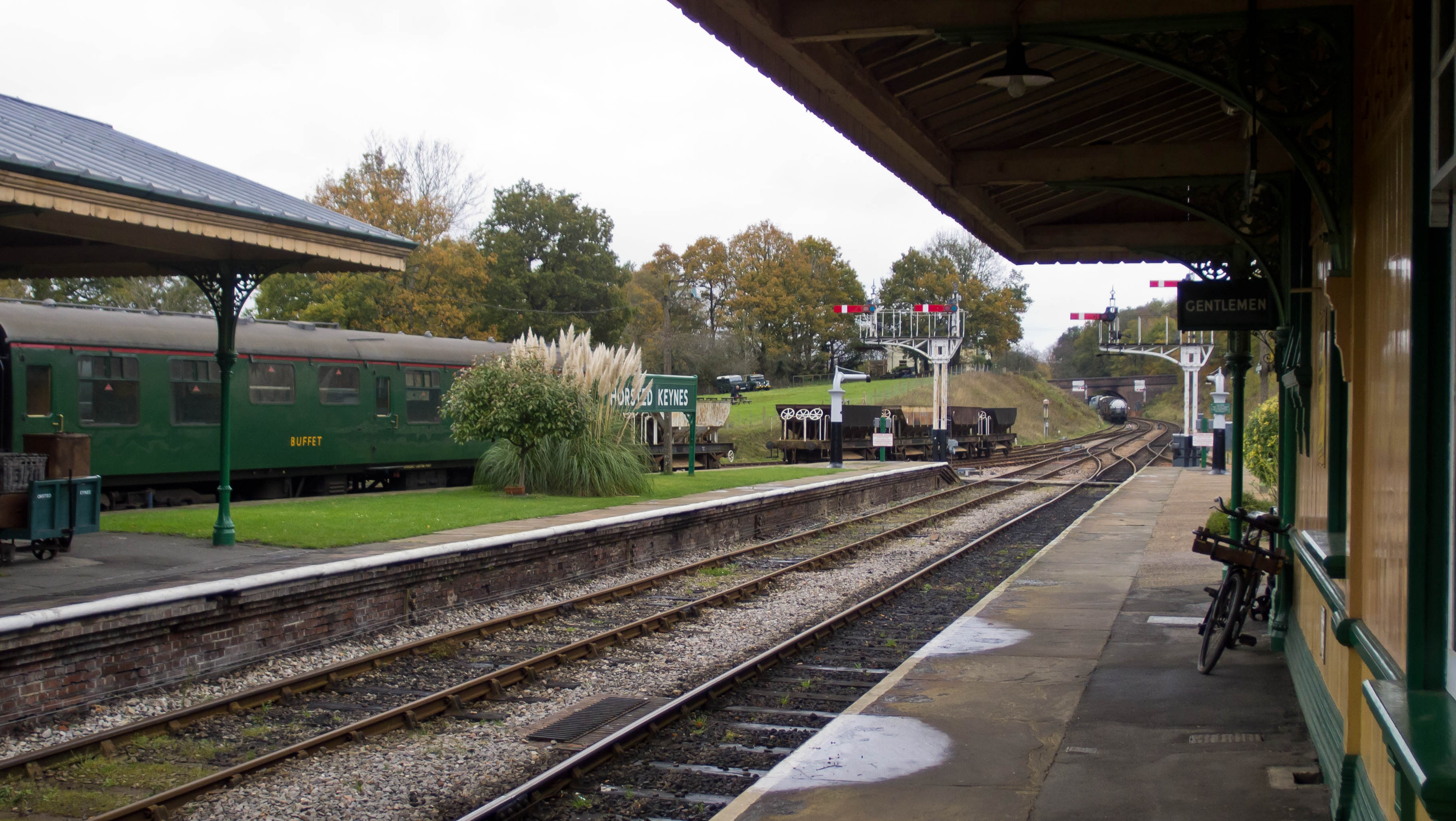
Railway station in Horsted Keynes

The railway station, three-quarters of a mile from the village, was on the line from East Grinstead to Lewes. It is now owned and operated by the Bluebell Railway, which is largely run by volunteers and operates using vintage steam trains. The station originally also had a connection with Haywards Heath, between 1883 and 1963.

== Notable people ==
- Robert Leighton (1611–1684), a Scottish prelate and scholar, lived at Broadhurst Manor, buried there
- Harold Macmillan (1894–1986), former Prime Minister, owner of Birch Grove – buried here, alongside his wife Dorothy Macmillan
- Katie Derham (born 1970), BBC newscaster and a presenter on TV and radio, lives there
- Carla Lane (1928–2016), an English screenwriter, also lived in Broadhurst Manor

== See also ==
- Keynes family (descended from the de Cahaignes)
- Other de Cahaignes possessions
  - Ashton Keynes in Wiltshire
  - Milton Keynes in Buckinghamshire (see History of Milton Keynes § Norman conquest and the medieval period)
  - Somerford Keynes in Gloucestershire
