= Feng Depei =

Chinese neuroscientist and physiologist

Feng Depei (Te-Pei Feng)
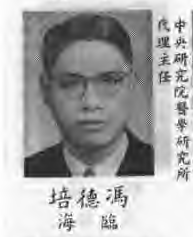
- Feng Depei, representative of Linhai County, Zhejiang Province at the First National Congress
- Born: February 20, 1907; Taizhou, Zhejiang, Great Qing
- Died: April 10, 1995 (aged 88); Shanghai, China
- Education: Fudan University (BSc, 1926); University of Chicago (MSc, 1930); University College London, University of London (PhD, 1933)
- Known for: Feng effect
- Scientific career
- Fields: Neuroscience; Physiology
- Workplaces: Peking Union Medical College; Academia Sinica; Peking University; Chinese Academy of Sciences
- Doctoral advisor: Archibald Hill

Feng Depei or Te-Pei Feng (simplified Chinese: 冯德培; traditional Chinese: 馮德培; pinyin: Féng Dépéi; 20 February 1907 – 10 April 1995) was a Chinese neuroscientist and physiologist. He is considered one of founders of modern Chinese neuroscience and physiology.

== Biography ==
Feng was born on February 20, 1907, in Linhai County, Taizhou, Zhejiang, Great Qing.

In 1922, Feng entered Fudan University in Shanghai, initially studied literature. At Fudan, Feng was attracted by newly emerged psychology, so he transferred to the psychological department in 1923. In 1925, a new professor of physiology named Cai Qiao joined Fudan, and the department of biology was founded. Feng became interested in biosciences, especially physiology. In 1926, Feng graduated from the biological department of Fudan (BSc), and became a lecturer at the same department.

In 1927, because of the student movement at Fudan, the department of biology was dissociated, so Feng had to leave Fudan. Feng went to Beiping (now Beijing), worked and worked under Robert Lim (Lin Kesheng) at Peking Union Medical College. Feng did research on thyroid secretion, with Zhang Xijun (张锡钧, who later elected Member of the Chinese Academy of Sciences). With Lim, Feng studied human gastric secretion.

In 1929, Feng won the Boxer Rebellion Indemnity Scholarship Program at Tsinghua University. Feng went to United States to continue his study. Feng studied at the University of Chicago, under Ralph W. Gerard. Feng did research on nerve metabolism, and graduated in 1930 from UChicago with MSc.

In 1930, Feng went to England, where he studied and did research in Cambridge and London. Feng obtained his PhD from the University College London, University of London in 1933, and his academic advisor was Archibald Hill (1922 Nobel Laureate in Medicine/Physiology). Feng subsequently worked at University of Cambridge and University of Oxford.

In 1933, recommended by Hill, Feng went to the United States again, and spent 1 year at the University of Pennsylvania, supported by the Eldridge Reeves Johnson Foundation for Medical Physics of UPenn.

In 1934, Feng returned to Beiping, and worked again at Peking Union Medical College (PUMC) as a professor. In 1941, due to World War 2, the PUMC was closed, and Feng went to Chongqing, the wartime capital of China. In 1943, Feng became the acting director of the Medical Research Institute (preparatory) of Academia Sinica. In 1945, invited by the British Council, Feng visited the United Kingdom. In 1947, Feng was a visiting scholar at the Rockefeller Institute for Medical Research (current Rockefeller University) in New York City.

Feng was professor of physiology at the Shanghai Medical College (current Fudan University Medical School), and the Director (1950–1984) and later Honorary Director (from 1984 till Feng's death) of the Chinese Academy of Sciences Institute of Physiology (also in Shanghai). Feng was Academician of Academia Sinica since 1948. Feng was President and later Honorary President of the Chinese Physiological Society. Feng was also Vice-President, and the Division Chair of Biology of the Chinese Academy of Sciences.

Feng was a representative of the first, second, and third National People's Congress (NPC) of the People's Republic of China. He had been a member of the National Standing Committee of the People's Political Consultative Conference (CPPCC) of China from 1978 to his death.

== Research ==
Feng's research includes

- The "Feng Effect" is named after him
- Physiology of neuromuscular junction (NMJ)
- Nerve-muscle trophic relations
- Synaptic plasticity in central synapses, especially the long-term potentiation (LTP) and its molecular basis

== Honors ==
- Academician, Academia Sinica (1948 election)
- Academician, Chinese Academy of Sciences (1955 election)
- Honorary Director, Chinese Academy of Sciences Institute of Physiology (1984–1995)
- Honorary President, Chinese Physiological Society
- Fellow, School of Life Sciences, Tsinghua University, P.R.China
- Fellow, University College London, University of London, UK (1981 election)
- Honorary Member, The Physiological Society, UK (1966 election)
- Honorary Member, Canadian Physiological Society, Canada (1979 election)
- Honorary Member, Neuroscience Society, USA (1981 election)
- Honorary Member, American Physiological Society, USA (1983 election)
- Foreign Member, United States National Academy of Sciences, USA (1986 election)
- Member, the TWAS, the academy of sciences for the developing world (1986 election)
- Foreign member, Indian Academy of Sciences (1988 election)

== See also ==
- Ralph W. Gerard
- Archibald Hill

== Autobiography ==
- T.P.Feng (March 1988). "Looking Back, Looking Forward". Annual Review of Neuroscience. 11: 1–13. doi:10.1146/annurev.ne.11.030188.000245. PMID 3284437.

== Literature ==
- Richard W. Tsien: A remembrance of Professor TP FENG(in English)
  - Acta Physiologica Sinica, December 25, 2007, 59(6): 713–715.
  - Remark: Feng was Tsien's mother's professor at the Peking Union Medical College in 1930s.
- CHEN Gong (Professor, Penn State Uni.): In memory of a great physiologist and my mentor Te-Pei FENG(in English)
  - Acta Physiologica Sinica, December 25, 2007, 59(6): 716.
  - Remark: Feng was Chen's academic mentor.
- Yu AC, Wan Y, Chui DH, Cui CL, Luo F, Wang KW, Wang XM, Wang Y, Wu LZ, Xing GG, Han JS (January 2008). "The Neuroscience Research Institute at Peking University: a place for the solution of pain and drug abuse". Cell Mol Neurobiol. 28 (1): 13–9. doi:10.1007/s10571-007-9244-z. PMC 11514998. PMID 18058018. S2CID 10193905.
