= Northern Ireland Housing Trust =

The Northern Ireland Housing Trust was a public authority which provided public housing in Northern Ireland from 1945 until 1971, when its functions were merged into the newly created Northern Ireland Housing Executive.

The Northern Ireland Housing Trust was established by the Housing Act (Northern Ireland) 1945. The Housing Committee of the Planning Advisory Board had published a report on housing in Northern Ireland in 1944, which estimated that 100,000 new houses were needed to meet Northern Ireland's housing needs. The Housing Trust was expected to build 25,000 of those, with the remaining 75,000 to be built by local councils. The Trust built 48,500 dwellings between 1945 and 1971, funded by government loans. Many used non-traditional prefab building techniques, like the concrete Orlit and No-fines and the steel-framed Easi-Form. However, these have since proved difficult to heat and insulate, prone to damp, and expensive to maintain. The Trust also built some high-rise tower blocks, partly because of green belt policies, but these had many problems, and most have since been demolished.

The Trust introduced a points-based system to allocate houses impartially, and was supposed to operate in conjunction with local councils. But because only ratepayers could vote in council elections, some councils, particularly in the west, were keen to control housing allocations in their areas for electoral advantage, and opposed the Trust's efforts, withholding planning permission and sewerage facilities and causing unnecessary delays. One Tyrone councillor explicitly stated, "we will not tolerate the Trust giving houses to Catholics." The number of houses the Trust built in western areas was thus low relative to need. They had difficulty building cheaply enough to keep the rent low, and there was a perception that they favoured better-off tenants. These factors had the effect of disadvantaging Catholic tenants, which was one of the grievances that led to the Northern Ireland civil rights movement in the late 1960s.

Following civil disturbances in 1968–69, a commission appointed by the Northern Ireland government and led by Lord Cameron found that "grievances concerning housing were the first general cause of the disorders which it investigated". The Housing Executive Act (Northern Ireland) 1971 created a unitary housing authority for Northern Ireland, the Northern Ireland Housing Executive, which took over the functions of the Trust in 1971, the housing functions of the councils in 1972, and the housing functions of the New Town Development Commissions for Derry, Antrim, Ballymena, and Craigavon in 1973.
