= Charles Darwin Trust =

British educational charity

The Charles Darwin Trust is a British educational charity. The trust was founded in 1999 by Stephen Keynes. The trust was part of a campaign with other organizations to back the bid to make Down House a World Heritage Site.

== People ==
Trustees of the trust are Dr Claire Barlow (Chairman), Karen Goldie-Morrison (Treasurer), Professor James Costa, Sarah Darwin, Dr Chiara Ceci, Dr Emma Newall and Revd Professor Michael Reiss.

Previous trustees include Stephen Keynes, Randal Keynes, Professor Sir Patrick Bateson, Janet Browne, Sir Matthew Farrer, Timothy Hornsby, Angela Huxley, Professor J Stephen Jones and Professor Keith Stewart.
