= John Brown (writer) =

British theologian, historian, and writer

John Brown (1830–1922) was a British theologian, historian, and pastor.

Brown obtained a Bachelor of Arts and a Doctor of Divinity and served as pastor of Bunyan Meeting in the town of Bedford, Bedfordshire in the Eastern part of England. He was the author of several oft referenced works on church history and theology, including an important biography of John Bunyan, subtitled His Life, Times and Work.

== Personal life ==
Brown married Ada Haydon Ford (1837–1929) in 1859. Their children included Walter Langdon-Brown, the physician and professor of medicine; and Florence Ada Brown, a political activist combating poverty and eventual mayor of Cambridge, England. He is the grandfather of John Maynard Keynes.

== Works ==
As Author

- Puritan Preaching in England: A Study of Past and Present
- John Bunyan: His Life, Times and Work
- The Pilgrim Fathers of New England and Their Puritan Successors. Reprinted 1970 by Pilgrim Publications, Pasadena, Texas 77501.
- The History of The English Bible
- The Stundists (1893), digitized
- The Colonial Missions of Congregationalism : The Story of 70 Years (London, 1908). Quoted in "How Bunyan Became English" Isabel Hofmeyr, note 102 p. 105 https://www.jstor.org/stable/3070763

As Editor

- Life and Death of Mr. Badman and The Holy War by John Bunyan (1905)
- The Sermons of Thomas Adams: The Shakespeare of Puritan Theologians; A Selection
