= Florence Ada Keynes =

English author, historian and politician (1861–1958)

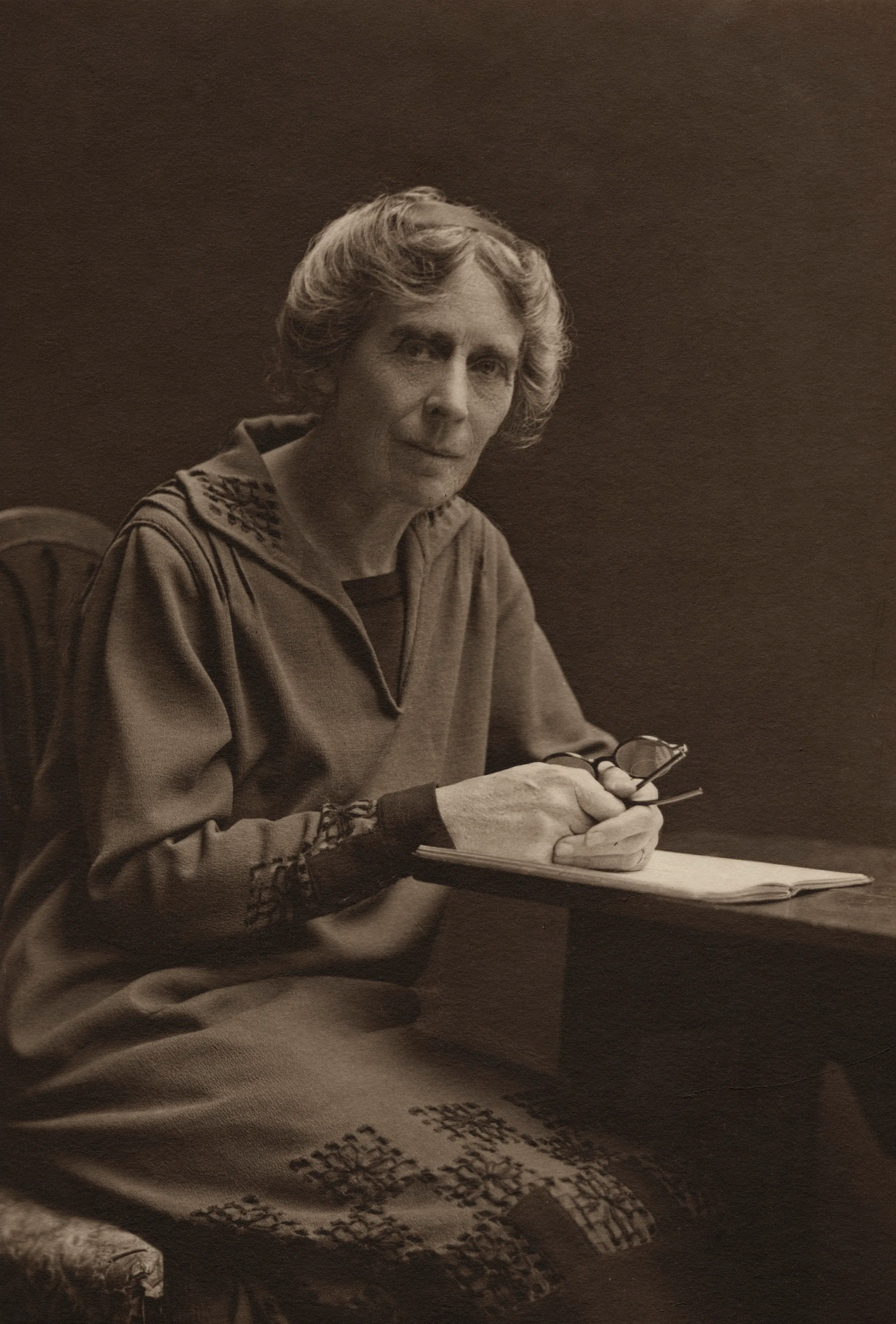
- Portrait by Olive Edis, c. 1925
- Born: Florence Ada Brown; 10 March 1861; Cheetham, Manchester, England
- Died: 13 February 1958 (aged 96); Cambridge, England
- Education: Newnham College, Cambridge
- Known for: Author, historian and politician
- Spouse: John Keynes (m. 1887; died 1949)
- Children: John, Margaret, and Geoffrey
- Parent: John Brown

Florence Ada Keynes (née Brown; 10 March 1861 – 13 February 1958) was an English author, historian and politician.

== Career ==
Keynes was an early graduate of Newnham College, Cambridge, where her contemporaries included the economist Mary Marshall. She subsequently became involved in local charitable work, establishing an early juvenile labour exchange, and was one of the founders of the Papworth Village Settlement for sufferers of tuberculosis, a forerunner of Papworth Hospital. She was secretary of the local Charity Organisation Society, which provided pensions for the elderly living in poverty, and worked with inmates of workhouses to resettle them into society. She encouraged women students to enter charitable work, including Eglantyne Jebb who was introduced to her by Marshall; Jebb subsequently founded Save the Children.

=== Cambridge Borough Council ===
She was the first female councillor of Cambridge City Council in August 1914, and was also a town magistrate. At 70 years of age, Keynes became Mayor of Cambridge on 9 November 1932, the second woman to hold the office. She chaired the committee responsible for the building of the new Guildhall, which was completed in 1939. In an article she published in The Cam magazine (March 1937), 'Progress with the New Guildhall', she introduced the history and architectural style of the guildhall and reported on its recent developments.

== Works ==
Retiring from public duties in 1939, she wrote a history of Cambridge, By-Ways of Cambridge History (Cambridge University Press, 1947). The book provides a glimpse into the city's history, focusing on its more obscure and forgotten corners, beyond its famous university and well-known landmarks. In 1950, she published a memoir, Gathering up the threads: A Study in Family Biography (W Heffer & Son Ltd, 1950), in which she discusses her ancestors along with the childhoods of her children John Maynard, Margaret and Geoffrey. In Chapter VII, 'End of an Age', she recalled John Maynard's attack of diphtheria and her experience of nursing him in Mentone, France.

== Family ==
Keynes was the daughter of Rev. John Brown of Bunyan's Chapel, Bedford, and schoolteacher Ada Haydon, née Ford (1837–1929). Her brother Sir Walter Langdon-Brown was the Regius Professor of Physic (medicine) at the University of Cambridge.

She married the economist John Neville Keynes in 1882. They had a daughter and two sons:

- John Maynard Keynes (1883–1946), the economist and public servant
- Margaret Neville Hill (1885–1970), who in 1913 married Archibald Hill, winner of the 1922 Nobel Prize in Physiology
- Geoffrey Langdon Keynes (1887–1982), a surgeon

== See also ==
- Keynes family
- Papworth Hospital
