= Quentin Keynes =

British explorer (1921–2003)

The cover of Quentin Keynes' biography by his nephew Simon Keynes.

Quentin George Keynes (/ˈkeɪnz/ KAYNZ; 17 June 1921 – 26 February 2003) was an explorer, writer, filmmaker, and bibliophile.

Keynes was born in London, the second son of Geoffrey Keynes and his wife Margaret, the daughter of George Howard Darwin who in turn was the son of Charles Darwin, making Keynes Darwin's great-grandson. He was also the nephew of the economist, John Maynard Keynes. His older brother Richard was a physiologist, and younger brothers Milo and Stephen both writers.

Keynes moved to the United States in 1939. Shortly after the Second World War he started his life as an explorer of Africa and sub-equatorial islands of the Atlantic and Indian Oceans. He made several films, and wrote several articles for the National Geographic magazine. He was a member of the Roxburghe Club and collected books principally on the great explorers of the 19th century, but also travel, natural history, including rare and first editions of works by his grandfather Charles Darwin, and modern literature. His collection of rare books and manuscripts was sold by Christie's in a series of four auctions in 2004.

In 1955, he is credited with taking seventeen-year-old Peter Beard on a life-altering trip to document rare wildlife, including the white and black rhinos of Zululand. Beard would spend the rest of his life in Africa, photographing wildlife.

A biography of Keynes was published in 2004 by his nephew, the historian Simon Keynes.

== See also ==
- Keynes family
