= Milo Keynes =

Milo Keynes FRCS
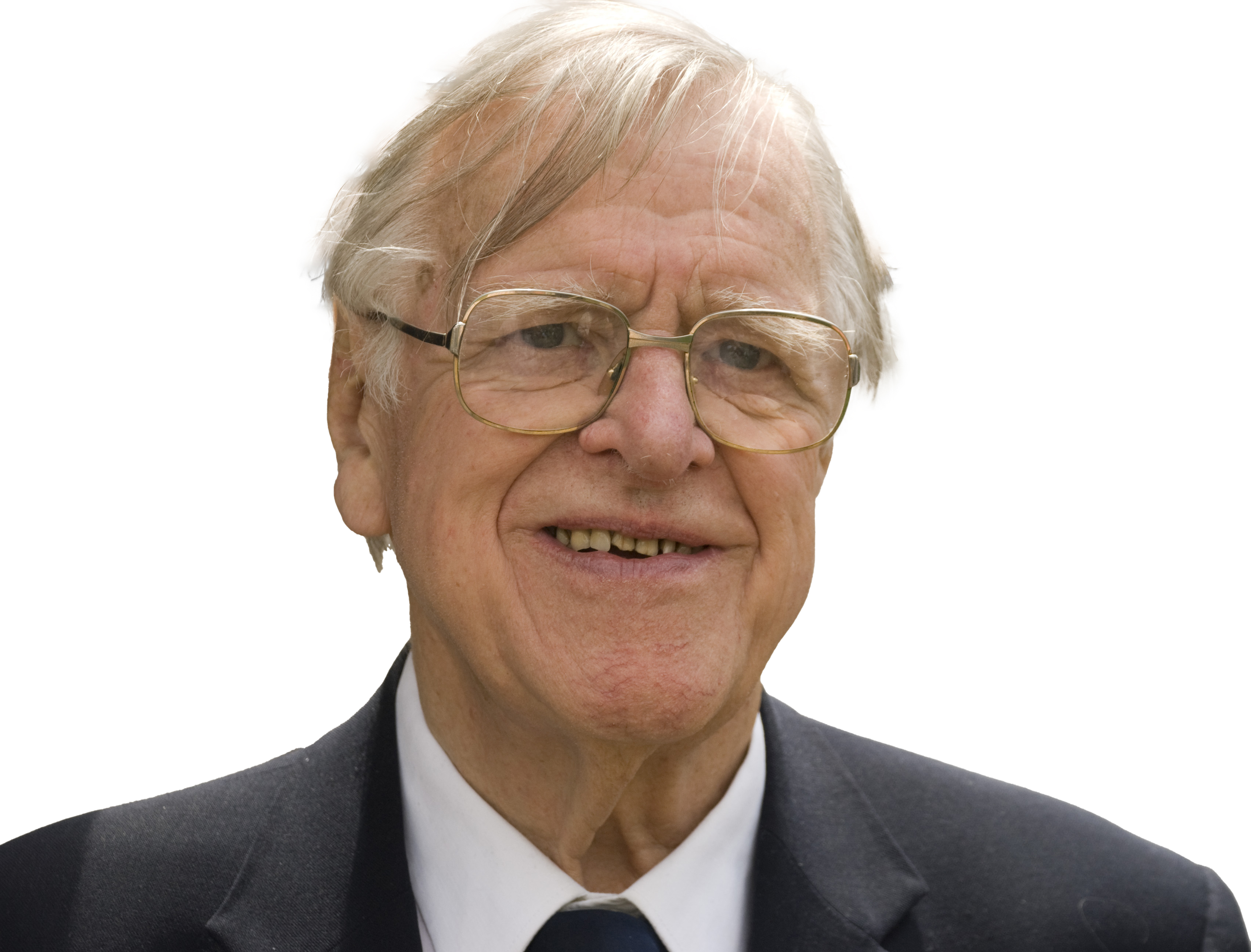

Personal details
- Born: William Milo Keynes; 9 August 1924
- Died: 18 February 2009 (aged 84)

William Milo Keynes (/ˈkeɪnz/ KAYNZ; 9 August 1924 – 18 February 2009) was a British doctor and author. He was educated at Oundle and University of Cambridge. He was the brother of Richard, Quentin and Stephen. He was interested in education and art, publishing books and essays about John Maynard Keynes, Isaac Newton, and the history of science. Upon his death he bequeathed a number of rare artworks to the University of Cambridge.

Milo was descended from a Cambridgeshire family that included both the lineage from two great families, the Keynes (of John Maynard Keynes) and Darwins (of Charles Darwin). He was the third son of Sir Geoffrey Keynes, and his wife Margaret Darwin, daughter of Sir George Darwin. He was a great-grandson of the scientist Charles Darwin, and the nephew of the famous Cambridge economist John Maynard Keynes.

In 2010, his estate bequeathed a number of artworks and rare documents, including a portrait of John Maynard Keynes by Duncan Grant, to the University of Cambridge's Fitzwilliam Museum.

== Books ==
In 1983 Keynes edited a short collection of essays on his uncle and a biography of his uncle's wife, Lydia Lopokova. He also wrote books on the history of science, on Isaac Newton and on Mendelism in human genetics.

== Bibliography ==
- Essays on John Maynard Keynes
- A Century of Mendelism in Human Genetics
- The Iconography of Sir Isaac Newton to 1800
- Lydia Lopokova. St. Martin's Press. 1983. ISBN 0312500394.
- Sir Francis Galton: The Legacy of His Ideas
- Evolutionary Studies: Centenary Celebration of the Life of Julian Huxley

== See also ==
- Keynes family
- Darwin–Wedgwood family
