= Coombe Keynes =

Hamlet in Dorset, England

Coordinates: 50.6576°N 2.2241°W

- Hamlet
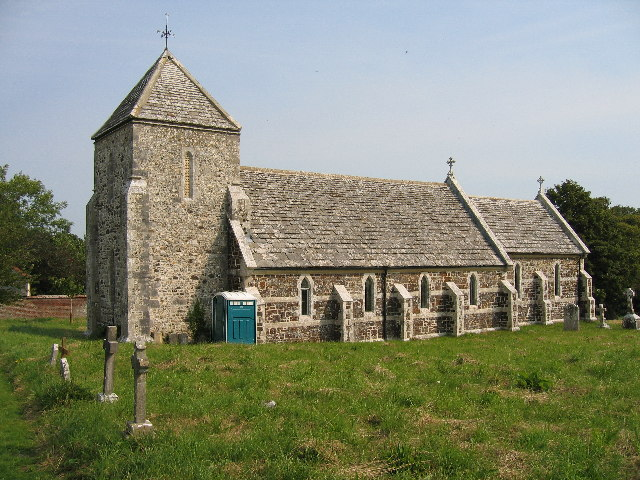
- Holy Rood parish church

- Location within Dorset
- Population: 80
- OS grid reference: SY842842
- Unitary authority: Dorset
- Ceremonial county: Dorset
- Region: South West
- Country: England
- Sovereign state: United Kingdom
- Post town: Wareham
- Postcode district: BH20
- Dialling code: 01929
- Police: Dorset
- Fire: Dorset and Wiltshire
- Ambulance: South Western
- UK Parliament: South Dorset
- Website: Coombe Keynes Community web site

Coombe Keynes is a hamlet, civil parish and depopulated village in Dorset, England. The village is about 2 miles (3 km) south of Wool and about 5 miles (8 km) west-south-west of Wareham.

In 2013 the population of the civil parish was estimated to be 80. There are 22 houses in the hamlet and 37 properties in the parish as a whole.

== History ==
Coombe Keynes was part of Winfrith Hundred. The Domesday Book of 1086 records it as Cume, held by Gilbert de Magminot, Bishop of Lisieux. The name Keynes derives from the later Lords of the Manor, the de Cahaignes family, who also held Tarrant Keyneston.

Later Coombe Keynes' population declined until it is now only a hamlet. The lost part of the settlement was immediately east of the parish church. The area is now a field with what appear to be platforms where cottages stood and a sunken lane. This depopulated area is now a Scheduled Ancient Monument.

The Church of England parish church of the Holy Rood was formerly the centre of a large parish that included the village of Wool. In 1844 Wool was made into a separate parish. The two ecclesiastical parishes were recombined in 1967.

The chancel arch and west tower of Holy Rood Church is 13th-century. The rest of the church was rebuilt in 1860–61 to designs by Thomas Hicks. It is a Gothic Revival building with nave, chancel and north porch. It was deconsecrated in 1974 and is now used as a secular function room managed by the Coombe Keynes Trust.

The Coombe Keynes Chalice, a rare pre-Reformation chalice with an octagonal foot with embellished angles on the stem, is now kept in the Dorset Museum.
