= Geoffrey Keynes =

English surgeon and bibliophile (1887–1982)

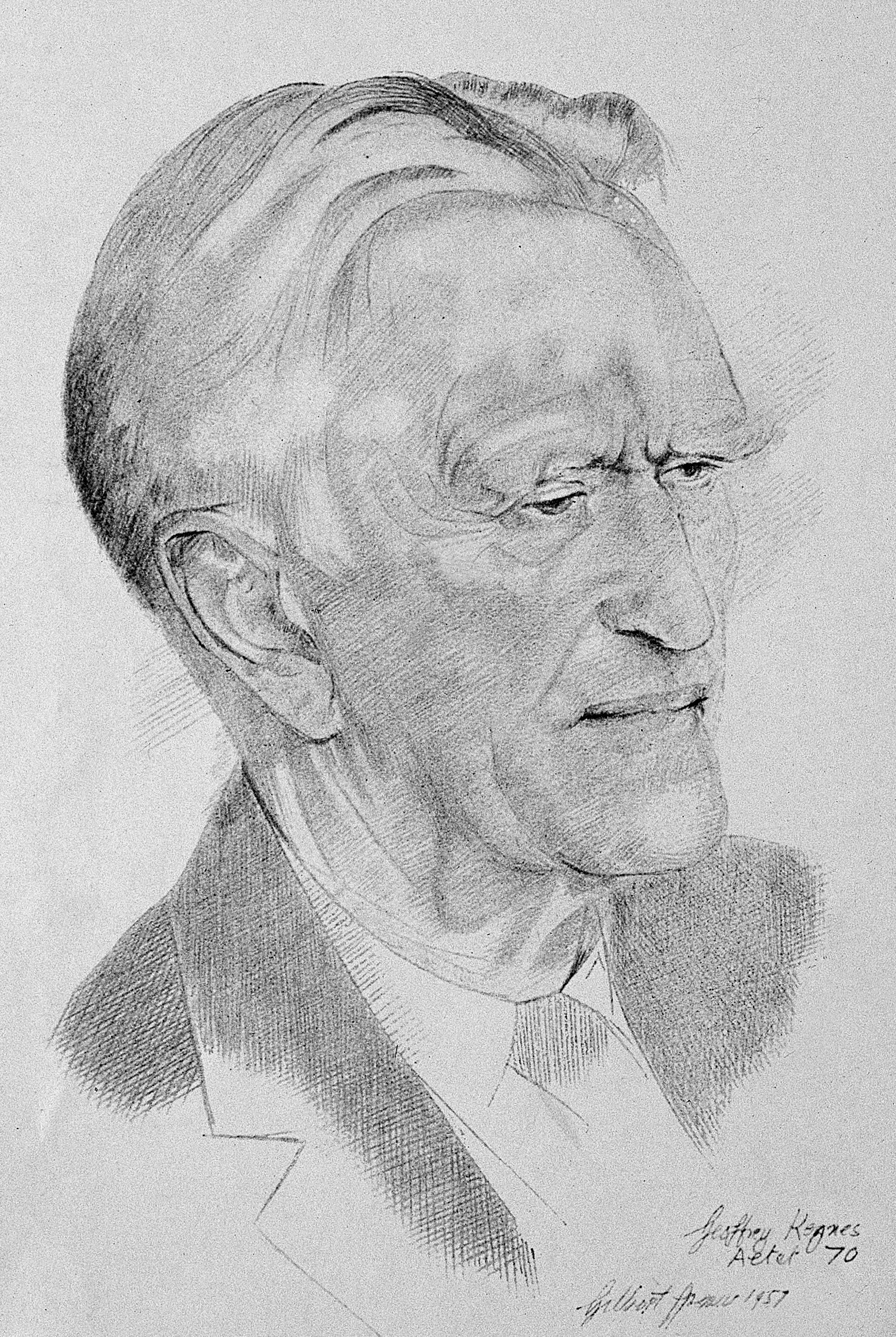
- Geoffrey Keynes in 1957
- Born: March 25, 1887; Cambridge
- Died: July 5, 1982 (aged 95); Cambridge
- Education: Pembroke College, Cambridge
- Occupations: Surgeon, author, bibliographer

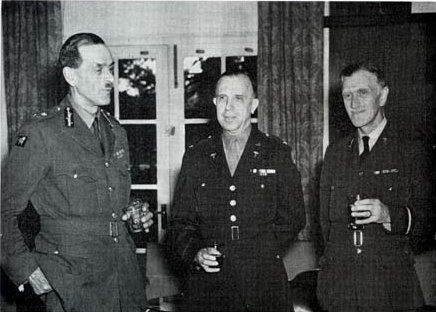
A Second World War era photograph showing Keynes (right) with surgeons Max Page (left) and Col. Oramel H. Stanley.

Sir Geoffrey Langdon Keynes (/ˈkeɪnz/ KAYNZ; 25 March 1887, Cambridge – 5 July 1982, Cambridge) was a British surgeon and author. He began his career as a physician in World War I, before becoming a doctor at St Bartholomew's Hospital in London, where he made notable innovations in the fields of blood transfusion and breast cancer surgery. Keynes was also a publishing scholar and bibliographer of English literature and English medical history, focusing primarily on William Blake and William Harvey.

== Early life and education ==
Geoffrey Keynes was born on 25 March 1887 in Cambridge, England. His father was John Neville Keynes, an economics lecturer at the University of Cambridge and his mother was Florence Ada Brown, a successful author and a social reformer. Geoffrey Keynes was the third child, after his older brother, the prominent economist John Maynard Keynes, and his sister Margaret, who married the Nobel Prize–winning physiologist Archibald Hill.

He attended Rugby School, where he became friends with English poet Rupert Brooke. In 1915 he was appointed literary executor for Brooke's estate.

He graduated from Pembroke College, Cambridge, where he earned a first-class degree in the Natural Sciences Tripos. He was later made an honorary fellow of Pembroke College. Keynes then qualified for a scholarship to become a surgeon with the Royal College of Surgeons in London.

== Career ==
=== First and Second World Wars ===
Keynes delayed his medical education in order to serve in World War I, where he served as a Lieutenant in the Royal Army Medical Corps and then worked as a consultant surgeon, becoming an expert in blood transfusion. His experience in the First World War led him to publish Blood Transfusion, the first book on the subject written by a British author. Keynes also founded the London Blood Transfusion Service with P. L. Oliver. Alexander Bogdanov acquired a copy of this book whilst visiting London to negotiate the Anglo-Soviet Trade Agreement in 1922. Bogdanov went on to found the Institute for Haematology and Blood Transfusions in Moscow.

Keynes was deeply affected by the brutality and gore that he witnessed in the field, which may have influenced his dislike for radical surgery later in his career.

Keynes enlisted to be a consulting surgeon to the Royal Air Force at the outbreak of World War II. In 1944 he was promoted to the rank of acting air vice-marshal.

=== Medical career ===
Keynes began working full-time at St Bartholomew's Hospital in London, where he worked under George Gask and Sir Thomas Dunhill, after returning from World War I. Keynes used his influence as an assistant surgeon to advocate for limited surgery instead of the invasive radical mastectomy as treatment for breast cancer. Frustrated with the mortality rate and gruesomeness of the radical mastectomy, Keynes experimented by inserting 50 milligrams of radium in a patient's tumour. He later observed that, "The ulcer rapidly healed ... and the whole mass became smaller, softer and less fixed."

Keynes pursued his new idea through a number of trials, observing the effectiveness of injecting radium chloride into breast cancer tumours compared with the effectiveness of the radical mastectomy. The promising results of these trials led Keynes to be cautiously optimistic, writing in 1927 that the "extension of [an] operation beyond a local removal might sometimes be unnecessary." Keynes's outlook was considered a radical break from the medical consensus at the time. Keynes wrote in his autobiography that his work with radium "was regarded with some interest by American surgeons," but that the concept of a limited mastectomy failed to gain significant traction in the medical community at the time. His doubts regarding the radical mastectomy were vindicated some 50 years later, when innovators like Bernard Fisher and others revisited his data and pursued what became known as a lumpectomy. Limited surgeries, like the lumpectomy, accompanied by radiation are now the standard treatment for breast cancer.

Keynes was also a pioneer in the treatment of myasthenia gravis. Much like with breast cancer, the medical community knew little about how to treat the disease at the time. Keynes pioneered the removal of the thymus gland, which is now the standard treatment for myasthenia gravis.

In 1955 Keynes received a knighthood for services to medicine.

=== Literary work ===
Keynes maintained a passionate interest in English literature all his life and devoted a large amount of his time to literary scholarship and the science of bibliography. He was a leading authority on the literary and artistic work of William Blake. He also produced biographies and bibliographies of English writers such as Sir Thomas Browne, John Evelyn, Siegfried Sassoon, John Donne and Jane Austen.

Keynes held the Sandars Readership in Bibliography at Cambridge University in 1933 speaking on "John Evelyn: a study in bibliography" which was included in John Evelyn: A Study in Bibliophily with a Bibliography of His Writings.

He was also a pioneer in the history of science, with studies of John Ray, William Harvey and Robert Hooke. His biography The Life of William Harvey was awarded the 1966 James Tait Black Memorial Prize. Keynes also collected books, with a personal library with around four thousand works.

His autobiography The Gates of Memory was published in 1981, and he died the following year, aged 95. The Gates of Memory includes anecdotes of Keynes's numerous run-ins and friendships with other famous public figures. For example, Keynes often went climbing with George Mallory, the renowned British mountaineer; he also once performed life-saving treatment on Virginia Woolf after the budding author overdosed on pills.

== Personal life ==
On 12 May 1917 Keynes married Margaret Elizabeth Darwin, the daughter of Sir George Howard Darwin and granddaughter of Charles Darwin. They had one daughter, who died in infancy, and four sons:

- Harriet Frances Keynes (1918–1918)
- Richard Darwin Keynes (1919–2010)
- Quentin George Keynes (1921–2003)
- William Milo Keynes (1924–2009)
- Stephen John Keynes (1927–2017)

Keynes dedicated his life to his work and was also sociable with many friends. He took pride in never having been drunk, and was known by most as an affable, well-mannered man.

== Legacy ==
Keynes's contributions profoundly influenced the fields of surgery and English literature. He pioneered limited breast cancer surgery accompanied by radiation, a strategy that has endured the test of time. His work on William Blake "was instrumental in establishing Blake as a central figure in the history of English art and literature."

A library of his scholarly works, notes, and correspondences is held by the University of Cambridge.

== Works ==
- A Bibliography of Dr. John Donne (London: Quaritch, 1914; 2nd edition, Cambridge: University Press, 1932; 1958; 1973)
- A Bibliography of William Blake (The Grolier Club, New York, 1921)
- Blood Transfusion (H. Frowde, London, 1922)
- A Bibliography of Sir Thomas Browne (Cambridge, 1924, 1968)
- William Pickering, Publisher: A Memoir and a Hand-List of his Editions (The Fleuron, 1924)
- Jane Austen: a Bibliography (Nonesuch Press, 1929)
- Selected Essays of William Hazlitt 1778 : 1830 (Nonesuch Press, 1930)
- The Works of Sir Thomas Browne (Faber & Gwyer / Faber & Faber 1928-1931 [6 volumes], 1964 [4 volumes])
- The Note-Book of William Blake (Nonesuch Press, 1935)
- John Evelyn: a Study in Bibliophily & a Bibliography of his Writings (Cambridge, 1937)
- Blake (Faber and Faber, 1945) (The Faber Gallery series)
- The Poetical Works of Rupert Brooke (Faber & Faber, 1946)
- William Blake, 1757–1827 (Paris: British Council and Galerie René Drouin, 1947)
- Poetry and Prose of William Blake (Nonesuch Press, 1948)
- The Portraiture of William Harvey (Royal College of Surgeons, 1949) (The Thomas Vicary Lecture 1948)
- The Personality of William Harvey (Cambridge University Press: 1949)
- William Blake's Engravings, edited with an introduction (Faber and Faber, 1950)
- The Tempera Paintings of William Blake (London: Arts Council of Great Britain, 1951)
- The Apologie and Treatise of Ambroise Containing the Voyages Made into Divers Places with Many of His Writings Upon Surgery (1951)
- Samuel Butler's Notebooks (London: Cape, 1951; New York: E.P. Dutton & Company, Inc., 1951) with Brian Hill
- Poems of Rupert Brooke (1954)
- A Bibliography of Rupert Brooke (Rupert Hart-Davis, 1954) (The Soho Bibliographies, No. 4)
- The Letters of William Blake (Rupert Hart-Davis, 1956, 1968)
- Harvey Through John Aubrey's Eyes: The Harveian Oration of 1958 (London: Royal College of Physicians, 1958)
- A Bibliography of Dr. Robert Hooke (Oxford: Clarendon Press, 1960)
- Essays in Biography (London: Mercury Books, 1961)
- Dr. Timothie Bright 1550—1615. A Survey of his Life with a Bibliography of his Writings (Wellcome Historial Medical Library, 1962) (Wellcome Historical Medical Library Publications. New Series. No. 1.)
- A Bibliography of Siegfried Sassoon (Rupert Hart-Davis, 1954) (The Soho Bibliographies, No. 10)
- A Study of the Illuminated Books of William Blake: Poet, Printer, Prophet (New York: Orion Press in association with Trianon Press, Paris, 1964)
- An Exhibition of the Illuminated Books of William Blake: Poet – Printer – Prophet (Clairraux: Trianon Press, 1964) with Lessing J. Rosenwald
- On Editing Blake (Edinburgh University Press, 1964)
- Blake (Knowledge Publications in association with Purnell & Sons, 1965) (The Masters, 6)
- Blake: Complete Writings with Variant Readings, editor, Oxford University Press, 1966 (UK-Paperback, Revised). ISBN 0192810502
- The Life of William Harvey (Oxford: Clarendon Press, 1966)
- William Blake. Songs of Innocence and of Experience, editor, with Introduction and Commentary. (London: Oxford University Press, 1967)
- Henry James in Cambridge (Cambridge: W. Heffer & Sons Ltd., 1967)
- Sir Thomas Browne, Selected Writings (University of Chicago Press, 1968)
- The Letters of Rupert Brooke (London: Faber & Faber, 1968; New York: Harcourt, Brace and World, 1968)
- William Blake: Engraver. A Descriptive Catalogue of an Exhibition (Princeton University Press, 1969) with Charles Ryskamp
- William Pickering, Publisher: A Memoir and a Check-List of his Publications (revised edition of the 1924 edition; London, Galahad Press, 1969; New York, Burt Franklin, 1969)
- Drawings of William Blake: 92 Pencil Studies. Selection, Introduction and Commentary, Dover Publications, Inc., New York, 1970 ISBN 0-486-22303-5
- A Bibliography of Sir William Petty F.R.S. and of 'Observations on the Bills of Mortality' by John Graunt F.R.S. Oxford : Clarendon Press (1971)
- William Blake's Water-Colours Illustrating the Poems of Thomas Gray (Chicago: J. Philip O'Hara and Paris: Trianon Press, 1972)
- Deaths Duell: A Sermon Delivered before King Charles I in the Beginning of Lent 1630/1, by John Donne (Boston: Godine, 1973)
- The Marriage of Heaven and Hell (Oxford University Press, 1975)
- A Bibliography of Henry King D.D., Bishop of Chichester (Douglas Cleverdon, 1977)
- The Gates of Memory (Oxford University Press, 1981)
- A Watch of Nightingales (London: The Stourton Press, 1981) edited with Peter Davidson

== Sources ==
- Geoffrey Keynes: The gates of memory. Oxford : Oxford University Press; ISBN 0-19-812657-3
- To Geoffrey Keynes: Articles from the "Book Collector" to Commemorate His Eighty-Fifth Birthday (The Book Collector, 1972, ISBN 0903482002) with Francis Meynell, A. N. L. Munby, David Garnett, John Sparrow
