= Margaret Hill (social reformer) =

British social reformer (1885–1970)

- Born: Margaret Neville Keynes; 1885; Cambridge, England, British Empire
- Died: 22 June 1970 (aged 84–85); Cambridge, England, United Kingdom
- Education: Wycombe Abbey
- Occupations: Public Service and Welfare
- Spouse: Archibald Hill (m. 1913)
- Children: Polly, David, Maurice, and Janet
- Awards: CBE

Margaret Neville Hill CBE (née Keynes; 1885 – 22 June 1970) devoted her career to the welfare of the elderly and was the founder of Hill Homes in Highgate, and Hornsey Housing Trust in Hornsey.

== Early years ==
Margaret Neville Keynes was born in Cambridge in 1885, the middle child of three of John Keynes and Florence Ada Keynes. Her older brother was the economist John Maynard Keynes and her younger brother the distinguished surgeon and scholar Sir Geoffrey Keynes. She was brought up in Harvey Road, Cambridge and was educated at home by a governess and later at Wycombe Abbey School.

== Career ==
=== Cambridge ===
Instead of academia, Margaret chose a career which followed the pattern of her mother's. Florence Keynes had attended Newnham College, Cambridge, went on to become a social reformer, magistrate and the first woman councillor of Cambridge, becoming Mayor in 1932. She established an early juvenile labour exchange, the Cambridge Boys' Employment Registry, and was secretary of the local Charity Organisation Society, which provided pensions for the elderly living in poverty.

Margaret's first job was at the Boys' Employment Registry with Eglantyne Jebb (founder of the Save the Children charity in 1919), later setting up a similar one for girls. There is a Blue Plaque above 82 Regent Street where the Boys' Employment Registry was sited. Margaret and Eglantyne developed a close relationship, which came to an end with Margaret's engagement to Archibald Hill in February 1913. Margaret resigned as Secretary of the Boy's Employment Registry in 1912, when her friend and future sister-in-law, Margaret Darwin, the daughter of Sir George Howard Darwin and granddaughter of Charles Darwin, took over, but she remained on the board until 1920, when the Hills moved to Manchester, then London in 1923.

=== Highgate, London ===
Within a year of the Hills' arrival in the north London suburb of Highgate, Margaret became involved in voluntary social work, firstly with the Hornsey Maternity and Child Welfare Centres, setting up a Highgate branch in 1928 and then becoming a Poor Law Guardian. In 1929, she was elected to the Hornsey Borough Council and in 1933 was one of the founder members of the Hornsey Housing Trust. From the work of the Trust, Margaret realised that ′some of the older and more infirm tenants were in need of personal help as well as accommodation′ and in 1939 Margaret opened her first home for eight elderly ladies, called Delia Grotten's at 47, Cecile Park Road, Crouch End, London N8, with her parents making a generous contribution towards the conversion of the Edwardian house. Today there are thousands of modest residential and nursing homes for the elderly, but when Delia Grotten's opened it was almost unique.

During World War 2, because of her official Council position, she was given responsibility for the air raid shelters dug in the Borough's parks and open spaces, but her main occupation throughout the war was to set up an organisation, Highgate Homes for Aged War Victims, which requisitioned large vacant houses for the elderly who had lost their homes through bombing. In 1941, she helped found the National Old People's Welfare Council (now part of Age Concern) and in 1943 became a member of the Rowntree Committee on the Care of Old People.

In 1944, Hill Homes Ltd was formed, with Margaret appointed as Chair, holding its inaugural meeting at 16 Bishopswood Road, on 6 June 1944 (D Day). She served as Chair for the next 20 years during which time the number of homes owned and managed by Hill Homes expanded to nine. She was made the company's first President in 1966. In 1957 her work was publicly recognised when she was awarded the CBE.

== Personal life ==
Margaret married Archibald Vivian Hill in June 1913. They moved from Cambridge to Altrincham near Manchester in 1920 when Hill was appointed as professor of Physiology at Manchester University. In 1923, Hill became the Jodrell Professor of Physiology at University College London and they moved to 16 Bishopswood Road, Highgate. A Blue plaque commemorating her husband was erected on the house by English Heritage in 2015. During their 44 years in Highgate, according to their grandson Nicholas Humphrey, the Hills' informal tea parties at their home were attended by as many as 18 Nobel Laureates, as well as their friends Stephen Hawking and Sigmund Freud. They retired to Cambridge in 1967, where Margaret Hill died on 22 June 1970 from Parkinson's disease.

Archibald and Margaret Hill had two sons and two daughters:

- Polly Hill (1914–2005), economist, married K. A. C. Humphreys, registrar of the West African Examinations Council
- David Keynes Hill (1915–2002), physiologist, married Stella Mary Humphrey
- Maurice Hill (1919–1966), oceanographer, married Philippa Pass
- Janet Hill (1918–2000) psychoanalyst, married the immunologist John Herbert Humphrey

== Publications ==
- Margaret Neville Keynes (1911). The Problem of Boy Labour in Cambridge. Cambridge: Bowes & Bowes.
- Margaret Neville Hill (1961). An Approach to Old Age and its Problems. Edinburgh; London: Oliver & Boyd.
