= Supporting People =

UK government program

The Supporting People Program was launched by the Labour British government on 1 April 2003 with a budget of £1.8 billion. The budget was reduced in subsequent years. Supporting People is a UK government programme to provide funding for non-statutory housing related support services for vulnerable people in England and Wales, with the focus being on helping them to live independently. Initially, it was paid by national government as a specific, ring-fenced grant to each local authority area. However, from 2009 the ring-fence was removed, allowing local authorities to spend the funding on other, non housing support related council services. Removal of the ring-fencing had been planned before the 2007-2008 financial crisis, the resulting major economic recession, and the implementation of austerity measures, particularly reductions in local authority funding from national government. Its coincidence with those events, however, lead to a significant reduction in the numbers of services and levels of housing related support available to vulnerable people across the country, as councils increasingly concentrated on ensuring statutory services were funded from their reduced income. Supporting People was created to provide continued funding for accommodation based charity and housing association services for vulnerable people, such as non-statutory hostels for homeless people, sheltered housing for elderly people, domestic abuse refuges, drug and alcohol rehab schemes. Prior to this, supported housing schemes had generally funded the support they provided by including it in the rent charged, which tended to be covered by housing benefit for the vast majority of residents. However this was overturned by a court ruling. In R v St Edmundsbury Housing Benefit Review board ex parte Sandys [1997], meaning that housing benefit was only payable for "bricks and mortar" costs of the accommodation, and could no longer be paid for providing support to the resident.

The judgment was summarised as ruling that HB "should meet service charges for personal support only in limited circumstances". This ruling prompted the newly elected Labour Government to implement interim measures in order to "stabilise existing supported housing provision and protect many thousands of vulnerable people until a long-term solution [could] be implemented".

Because the funding no longer required a service to be accommodation based, rent charging, and housing benefit receiving, the Supporting People Program had the benefit of widening the availability of support to people in non-supported housing. This meant floating support services could support people in their own, independent, homes, such as social and private tenants, and even home-owners.

== England ==
In England, the programme falls within the responsibilities of the Ministry of Housing, Communities and Local Government, which provides help to Local Authorities to run provide support programmes.

The programme effectively ceased in England in 2011, as funding for support services was no longer paid separately by national government, or ring-fenced, meaning each local authority would decide what, if any, support services it wanted to fund, from that point on.

Due to the crisis in housing-related support, in 2025 there were calls for a new Supporting People programme. However, up to January 2026, these calls have not been acted on by the government.

== Wales ==
In Wales, Supporting People is administered by the Welsh Assembly Government.

The aims of the Supporting People Programme in Wales are:

- helping vulnerable people live as independently as possible
- providing people with the help they need to live in their own homes, hostels, sheltered housing or other specialist housing
- preventing problems in the first place or providing help as early as possible in order to reduce demand on other services such as health and social services
- providing help to complement the personal or medical care that some people may need
- putting those who need support at the heart of the programme
- ensuring quality services, which are delivered as efficiently and effectively as possible through joint working between organisations that plan and fund services and those that provide services
- providing funding for support based on need
- promoting equality and reducing inequalities.

In Wales, a Supporting People Outcomes Framework has been developed to target and monitor the support provided. The aim of the Outcomes Framework is to help understand what Supporting People services achieve and to measure the impact support interventions have on those who receive services.

The Welsh Government, local authorities and housing-related support providers have been working in partnership to develop an outcomes framework.

The collection of outcomes based data has been compulsory for Supporting People funded services since 1 April 2012.
