= Somerford Keynes =

Village in Gloucestershire, England

Coordinates: 51.656°N 1.974°W

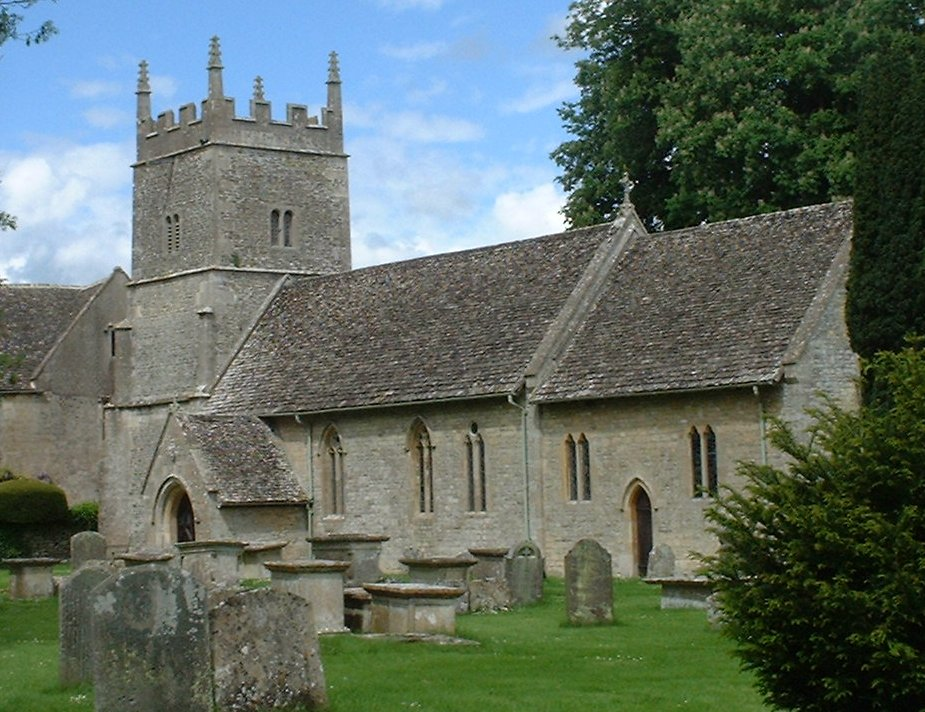
- All Saints parish church

- Location within Gloucestershire
- OS grid reference: SU019952
- Civil parish: Somerford Keynes
- Shire county: Gloucestershire
- Region: South West
- Country: England
- Sovereign state: United Kingdom
- Post town: CIRENCESTER
- Postcode district: GL7
- Dialling code: 01285
- Police: Gloucestershire
- Fire: Gloucestershire
- Ambulance: South Western
- UK Parliament: South Cotswolds
- Website: www.somerfordkeynes.org.uk/parish-council/

Somerford Keynes (/ˌsʌmərfʊd ˈkaɪnz/ SUM-ər-fuud KYNZE; grid reference SU019952) is a village and civil parish in the Cotswold district of Gloucestershire, England, close to the River Thames and about 5 miles (8 km) from its source. It lies on the boundary with Wiltshire, midway between Cirencester, Swindon and Malmesbury. The parish population at the 2011 census was 479, and a 2019 estimate put it at 558. The parish includes the village of Shorncote.

== History ==
A series of salvage excavations at Spratsgate Lane in 1986–1988 revealed part of an Iron Age and Roman settlement. The earliest finds were a series of curvilinear enclosures from the early 1st to the early 2nd century CE, which may have formed part of a farmstead. A religious focus is also suggested by an unusually large number of coins and brooches, which may have been votive offerings. Stone sculptural fragments were found of an eagle and a shield. These could belong to a representation of the Roman Capitoline triad (the gods Jupiter, Juno and Minerva), which again points to a formal religious presence.

The village first appears in writing in AD 685, in a charter confirming a gift of 40 hides of land by King Ethelred's nephew Bertwald to St Aldhelm, first abbot of Malmesbury. The manor was held in 1211 by William de Cahaignes, an ancestor of the Keynes family.

The Manor House is a Grade II listed building. Its core is probably from the late 15th century or early 16th; it was extended to the east in the 1630s, and a north-west wing was added in 1924.

== Parish church ==
The Church of England parish church of All Saints is a Grade II* listed building, built on Saxon foundations from about 685. It was largely rebuilt in the early 13th century. The tower was added in 1710–1713 and restored in 1875. The north aisle contains a large black-and-white marble monument with a reclining effigy of Robert Straung (Strange), who died in 1654. Several monuments in the churchyard listed by Historic England commemorate the Ferrebec family, William Hales (died 1806), a member of the Harrison family, two members of the Davis family, and others.

== Governance ==
Somerford Keynes has a parish council. It is represented by a county councillor for South Cerney Division and by a district councillor for Kemble ward of Cotswold District Council.

In 1894 the parish of Shorncott was abolished and merged with Somerford Keynes.

== Amenities ==
The nearest railway station is at Kemble, 2 1/2 miles (4 km) away. It has trains about once an hour to Gloucester, Cheltenham and Swindon. There are three or four daytime, weekday buses to Malmesbury and Cirencester.

The Thames Path, a long-distance footpath, passes through the parish, which lies in the western section of the Cotswold Water Park.

Elemental Sculpture Park is an annual seasonal art exhibition in Somerford Keynes, which in 2016 featured about 140 works by 50 sculptors.

== Wildlife ==
The first beavers to be born in Britain for 400 years appeared at Lower Mill Estate in 2008.

== Literary allusion ==
Somerford Keynes is the name of a character in the series of Rutshire Chronicles books by Jilly Cooper.

== Notes ==
1. "Somerford Keynes". Eagle in the Landscape: The archeology of the Cotswold Water Park. Archived from the original on 7 October 2007.
2. "Spratsgate Lane, Somerford Keynes, Gloucestershire". English Heritage.
3. "Somerford Keynes".
4. Historic England. "Manor House (1090085)". National Heritage List for England.
5. Historic England. "All Saints Church (1153987)". National Heritage List for England.
6. Historic England. "Ferrebec family monument (1090084)". National Heritage List for England.
7. Historic England. "William Hales monument (1090081)". National Heritage List for England.
8. Historic England. "Harrison and two Davis monuments (1090082)". National Heritage List for England.
9. Historic England. "Group of three monuments (1340955)". National Heritage List for England.
