= John Neville Keynes =

British economist (1852–1949)

- Born: 31 August 1852; Salisbury, England
- Died: 15 November 1949 (aged 97); Cambridge, England
- Occupations: Academic, philosopher, economist
- Spouse: Florence Ada Brown
- Children: 3, including John and Geoffrey

Academic background
- Education: Amersham Hall
- Alma mater: University College London; Pembroke College, Cambridge

Academic work
- Main interests: Applied economics, macroeconomics
- Notable ideas: Methodenstreit, formal logic

John Neville Keynes (/keɪnz/ KAYNZ; 31 August 1852 – 15 November 1949) was a British economist and father of John Maynard Keynes.

== Biography ==
Born in Salisbury, Wiltshire, Keynes was the child of John Keynes (1805–1878) and his wife Anna Maynard Neville (1821–1907). He was educated at Amersham Hall School, University College London and Pembroke College, Cambridge, where he became a fellow in 1876. He held a lectureship in Moral Sciences from 1883 to 1911. He was elected as Registrary in 1910, and held that office until 1925.

He divided economics into "positive economy" (the study of what is, and the way the economy works), "normative economy" (the study of what should be), and the "art of economics" (applied economics). The art of economics relates the lessons learned in positive economics to the normative goals determined in normative economics. He tried to synthesise deductive and inductive reasoning as a solution to the "Methodenstreit". His main works were:

- Studies and Exercises in Formal Logic (1884)
- The Scope and Method of Political Economy (1891)

In 1882 he married Florence Ada Brown, who was later a Mayor of Cambridge. They had two sons and a daughter:

- John Maynard Keynes (1883–1946), the economist
- Margaret Neville Keynes (1885–1970), who married Archibald Hill (winner of the 1922 Nobel Prize for Physiology) in 1913
- Geoffrey Langdon Keynes (1887–1982), a surgeon

He represented Cambridge University six times in the annual chess match against Oxford University and is the joint holder of the record for most appearances on either side.

He outlived his elder son by three years; he died in Cambridge, aged 97.

== See also ==
- Keynes family

== Sources ==
- Phyllis Deane (1987). "Keynes, John Neville," The New Palgrave: A Dictionary of Economics, v. 3, p. 92.
