= Pinsent =

Pinsent is a surname. Notable people with the surname include:

- Cecil Pinsent (5 May 1884 – 5 December 1963), British garden designer and architect
- David Pinsent (1891 – May 1918), friend and collaborator of the Austrian philosopher Ludwig Wittgenstein
- Ed Pinsent (born 1960), English cartoonist, artist and writer
- Dame Ellen Pinsent DBE (1866–1949), British mental health worker
- Gordon Pinsent, CC, FRSC (1930–2023), Canadian television, theatre and film actor
- Hester Pinsent, DBE (1899–1966), British mental health worker
- John Pinsent (1922–1995), English classical scholar
- Leah Pinsent (born 1968), Canadian television and film actress
- Mary Pinsent, RRC (1868–1960), British Matron
- Sir Matthew Pinsent, CBE (born 1970), English rowing champion, Olympic gold medallist, and broadcaster
- Robert John Pinsent (1797–1876), Canadian magistrate and politician
- Zack Pinsent (born c. 1994), British tailor of period clothing, costumer

== See also ==
- Pinsent's Arm, Newfoundland and Labrador
- The Pinsent Baronets of Selly Hill in the City of Birmingham, a title in the Baronetage of the United Kingdom
- Pinsent Masons LLP, a commercial law firm
- Pinsent's Paper, informal name of an academic journal
- Redgrave Pinsent Rowing Lake, a rowing lake in the United Kingdom
