= Skandar Keynes =

British political adviser and former actor (born 1991)

- Born: Alexander Amin Caspar Keynes; 5 September 1991 (age 35); Camden, London, England
- Education: Pembroke College, Cambridge (BA)
- Occupations: Actor (2001–2016); Political adviser
- Parents: Randal Keynes (father); Zelfa Hourani (mother)
- Relatives: Soumaya Keynes (sister); Charles Darwin (great-great-great-grandfather)
- Family: Keynes; Darwin–Wedgwood

Alexander Amin Caspar Keynes (Note: Keynes' third name was registered as "Casper" in Pembroke College's annual gazettes.) (born 5 September 1991) is an English political adviser and former actor. Best known for starring as Edmund Pevensie in The Chronicles of Narnia film series, he appeared in all three instalments: The Lion, the Witch and the Wardrobe, Prince Caspian, and The Voyage of the Dawn Treader.

== Early life ==
Keynes was born on 5 September 1991 in Camden, London to a English father (Randal Keynes) an author and a Lebanese mother (Zelfa Hourani). He has an older sister, Soumaya, a journalist and economist, who was the Britain economics editor at The Economist magazine and is currently an economics columnist at the Financial Times. They grew up in Islington, London.

=== Ancestry ===
On his father's side, Keynes is of English descent, and is the grandson of physiologist Richard Keynes, the nephew of two Cambridge professors, the historian Simon Keynes, and the neuroscientist Roger Keynes, the cousin of Catholic writer and apologist Laura Keynes, and the great-great-nephew of economist John Maynard Keynes. His great-great-great-grandfather was naturalist Charles Darwin. Keynes' great-grandparents were Nobel Prize laureate Edgar Adrian, 1st Baron Adrian and Hester Adrian, Baroness Adrian.

On his mother's side, Keynes is of Lebanese descent. His maternal grandfather was Lebanese writer Cecil Fadlo Hourani, who was an advisor to the late Tunisian president Habib Bourguiba. The Hourani family were immigrants to Manchester from Marjeyoun in southern Lebanon. Cecil's two brothers were Albert Hourani, a historian of the Middle East, and George Hourani, philosopher, historian, and classicist. Lebanese nationality law states that citizenship is passed on patrilineally, so Keynes is legally a foreigner in the country he considers his second home.

== Education ==
Keynes attended the Anna Scher Theatre School, after going to Thornhill Primary School. He then studied at the all-boys City of London School where he was awarded the Merit prize in the 2006 European Kangaroo competition, the City of London Corporate Scholarship (2008), The Geoffrey Clark Prize for Services to Drama (2009), and The Bennet Brough Prize for Chemistry (2010). He passed his A-level exams in spring 2010 with A*s and As in biology, chemistry, mathematics, further mathematics and history.

In October 2010, Keynes began his degree in Arabic, Persian and Middle Eastern History at Pembroke College, Cambridge. He consistently attained first-class results. Thus, in first year he was awarded the Marie Shamma'a Frost Prize in Oriental Studies (Arabic) and the College Scholarship; in second year the College Prize and the Foundation Scholarship which made him an elected member of the Faculty Board of Asian and Middle Eastern Studies (2011–2012); and in senior year the EG Browne Prize in Oriental Studies. He spent his third year studying in Lebanon to perfect his colloquial Arabic and wrote about his experiences on a weekly column in The Tab. His dissertation presented a comparison between the teaching of history in Iran and Saudi Arabia which required him to translate school textbooks from both countries. Achieving Firsts in both Parts of the Tripos, Keynes graduated with a Double First Class Honours BA degree in Middle Eastern Studies (Arabic and Persian) in June 2014. He was listed as one of Business Insider's "16 Incredibly Impressive Students At Cambridge University".

== Career ==
=== Film and audio ===
Skandar Keynes' acting career began when he was 9 years old with a role as a 'boy in rags' in the Royal Shakespeare Company production of Macbeth (2001) for British television. It was followed with a supporting role of a Victorian waif in the BBC2 television documentary Queen Victoria Died in 1901 and is Still Alive Today (2001). His first notable film part was at the age of ten playing the role of young Enzo Ferrari in the biopic film Ferrari (2003), directed by Carlo Carlei, which depicts Ferrari's rise from a successful race driver to one of the most famous entrepreneurs of all time.

Keynes achieved international prominence in the role of Edmund Pevensie in the major motion picture The Chronicles of Narnia: The Lion, the Witch and the Wardrobe (2005) directed by Andrew Adamson. Shot predominantly in New Zealand and a few in Central Europe, it was released in December 2005 to critical and high commercial success, grossing more than $745 million worldwide. In 2004, after the producers saw 2,000 young hopefuls, Keynes won the role of Edmund whose story is especially dramatic as his character is central to themes of betrayal, forgiveness, and redemption. He performed his own complex stunts: jumping into the ditch, sword fighting, and horse riding. He also voiced his character in the video game The Chronicles of Narnia: The Lion, the Witch and the Wardrobe. In 2006, Keynes was awarded the CAMIE Award (Character and Morality in Entertainment) for his portrayal.

He reprised his role as Edmund in Prince Caspian, directed by Andrew Adamson and released in May 2008 to generally positive reviews, grossing $419.7 million worldwide. He enjoyed the action-oriented stuntwork, touring New Zealand, Prague, Slovenia, Poland, and Czech Republic within seven months of shooting. For his performance, he was nominated for Best Performance in a Feature Film – Leading Young Actor and Best Performance in a Feature Film – Young Ensemble Cast at the 30th Young Artist Awards. Keynes also voiced his character in the video game The Chronicles of Narnia: Prince Caspian.

He returned as Edmund in The Voyage of the Dawn Treader, the third instalment of The Chronicles of Narnia, directed by Michael Apted, filmed in Australia and released in December 2010, grossing $415.7 million worldwide. In preparation, Keynes trained to earn his Professional Association of Diving Instructors license for underwater scenes. In 2011, the cast was nominated for Best Performance in a Feature Film – Young Ensemble Cast at the Young Artist Awards 2011.

In May 2014, Keynes was cast to voice the antagonist Sir Allan Kerr in Heirloom Audio Production's award-winning audio adventure In Freedom's Cause, a historical novel by G.A. Henty which recounts how the 14th-century Scottish hero William Wallace, famously portrayed by Mel Gibson in Braveheart, was a strong man of God. Keynes also appeared as himself in its promotional short film. The drama was released in November that year, winning five of the six categories it was nominated for at the 2015 Voice Arts Awards —the Oscars equivalent of voice acting: Outstanding Production, Outstanding Casting, Outstanding Audio Engineering, Audiobook Narration – Inspirational/Faith-Based Fiction, and Audiobook Narration – History. In January 2016, Keynes announced his retirement from acting.

=== Politics ===
In January 2015, Keynes completed a three-month internship at the United Nations High Commissioner for Refugees. During his stay in Amman, Jordan, he assisted in the research and writing of Living in the Shadows: Jordan Home Visits Report 2014, a study that found evidence of a rapid deterioration in the living conditions of Syrian refugees in Jordan as the Syrian conflict entered its fifth year. The report is based on data from home visits covering almost 150,000 Syrian refugees living outside of camps in Jordan. Published on January 14, 2015, it has been widely reported in the media and cited by foreign policy think tanks.

Keynes then worked at the House of Commons of the Parliament of the United Kingdom as a parliamentary adviser to Crispin Blunt, a British Conservative MP and former Chair of the Foreign Affairs Select Committee (2015–2017), until January 2018. In November 2015, he joined the committee on its visit to Beirut for an inquiry on the UK's role in the fight against the ISIL. In February 2016, with committee members Daniel Kawczynski and Stephen Gethins, he attended the European Parliament forum in Brussels which focused on conflicts in the MENA (Middle East and North Africa) region and discussed the then upcoming NATO Summit in Warsaw. In December that year, he participated in the IISS Manama Dialogue at the 12th Regional Security Summit in Bahrain and posed a question on the practical ways by which they could move constructive dialogue with Russia forward, having identified shared interests in defeating extremism and ending bloodshed in Syria, considering their "disagreements on the causes, solutions, and desired end states of these two problems". In February 2017, on behalf of the Qatar All-Party Parliamentary Group, he visited Qatar to meet ministers and officials, visit sites in development for the 2022 FIFA World Cup, and discuss issues of bilateral relations and regional crises. From 2016 to 2017, he accompanied Blunt in diplomatic visits to Cairo, Tunisia, Kurdistan, and Baghdad. Since then, Keynes has been working as a political adviser.

== Personal life ==
Keynes ran 42 km at the 2012 Beirut Marathon in aid of Prostate Cancer UK. He did extreme sports through bungee jumping in New Zealand at the Nevis Bungy, Sky Tower, Ledge Bungy, Shotover Canyon Swing, and from a jet. At Cambridge, he was an intramural Rugby player and played football with Freddie Highmore.

=== Conservation ===
Keynes supports conservation projects. He tracked down the Grey Wolf in the Jura Mountains in Switzerland as part of his work shadowing the International Union for Conservation of Nature (IUCN). His interview with wolf expert Jean-Marc Landry and deputy head Jean-Christophe Viẻ is featured on Wild Talk Radio Podcast. In March 2009, he contributed to English Heritage by writing the foreword to the Darwin issue of the Heritage Learning Journal (Issue 40). He also promoted connect2earth, an online community run by World Wide Fund for Nature. He joined his father in the Galapagos Tortoise Project by promoting Sebastian, one of the largest of the giant tortoises conserved by the archipelago's national park.

=== Lebanon ===
Keynes and his family have been visiting Marjeyoun in Lebanon yearly, despite the political situation, since he was a child. "I was here in 1996 during Operation Grapes of Wrath. I was four at the time and had no concept that it was war," Keynes told a reporter. "I remember when the gravity of the situation dawned on me. It was during the 2006 July war, I was 14 then... but it didn't really shake my view of Lebanon as effectively a second home, a place where I come to and I have family." Cognisant of the Lebanese nationality law, he expressed, "I understand that in part the law that a mother cannot pass her nationality to her children is tied with the Palestinian issue... I would like to see the law changed and be considered Lebanese by the government. When I arrive at the airport, I would like to show a Lebanese passport, and go to my [family's] house without having to get permission..."

== Filmography ==
=== Film ===
Year	Title	Role	Notes
2005	The Chronicles of Narnia: The Lion, the Witch and the Wardrobe	Edmund Pevensie	
2008	The Chronicles of Narnia: Prince Caspian	Edmund Pevensie	
2010	The Chronicles of Narnia: The Voyage of the Dawn Treader	Edmund Pevensie	
2014	In Freedom's Cause	Himself	Short film

=== Television ===
Year	Title	Role	Notes
2001	Macbeth	Boy in Rags	Royal Shakespeare Company TV production
2001	Queen Victoria Died in 1901 and is Still Alive Today	Waif	TV documentary
2003	Ferrari	Enzo Ferrari at 8 years old	Television film
2014	The Extraordinary Adventures of G.A. Henty: In Freedom's Cause	Sir Allan Kerr	Audio drama

=== Video game ===
Year	Title	Role	Notes
2005	The Chronicles of Narnia: The Lion, the Witch and the Wardrobe	Edmund Pevensie	
2008	The Chronicles of Narnia: Prince Caspian	Edmund Pevensie	

== Awards and nominations ==
Association	Year	Nominated work	Category	Result	Ref.
CAMIE Awards	2006	The Chronicles of Narnia: The Lion, the Witch and the Wardrobe	—N/a	Won	
Young Artist Awards	2009	The Chronicles of Narnia: Prince Caspian	Best Performance in a Feature Film – Leading Young Actor	Nominated	
Young Artist Awards	2009	The Chronicles of Narnia: Prince Caspian	Best Performance in a Feature Film – Young Ensemble Cast	Nominated	
Young Artist Awards	2011	The Chronicles of Narnia: The Voyage of the Dawn Treader	Best Performance in a Feature Film – Young Ensemble Cast	Nominated	
Voice Arts Awards	2015	In Freedom's Cause	Audiobook Narration – History, Best Voiceover	Won	
Voice Arts Awards	2015	In Freedom's Cause	Audiobook Narration – Inspirational/Faith-Based Fiction, Best Voiceover	Won	
Voice Arts Awards	2015	In Freedom's Cause	Outstanding Spoken Word or Storytelling – Best Performance	Nominated	

== Notes ==
=== See also ===
- Keynes family
- Darwin–Wedgwood family
