= Deaths in August 1977 =

The following is a list of notable deaths in August 1977. Entries for each day are listed alphabetically by surname. A typical entry lists information in the following sequence:

- Name, age, country of citizenship at birth, subsequent country of citizenship (if applicable), reason for notability, cause of death (if known), and reference.

== August 1977 ==
=== 1 ===
- Francis Gary Powers, 47, American aircraft pilot, officer of the United States Air Force (USAF), and employee of the Central Intelligence Agency (CIA), he was the pilot involved in the 1960 U-2 incident, when his aircraft was shot down by an S-75 Dvina (SA-2 "Guideline") surface-to-air missile over Sverdlovsk, a total of 14 missiles were launched during the incident,In August 1960, Powers was convicted of espionage, "a grave crime covered by Article 2 of the Soviet Union's law 'On Criminality Responsibility for State Crimes'", his sentence consisted of 10 years' confinement, three of which were to be in a prison, with the remainder in a labor camp,in February 1962, Powers was exchanged, along with the American student Frederic Pryor, for the Soviet KGB Colonel Rudolf Abel,Powers was killed in the 1977 Encino helicopter crash. The aircraft ran out of fuel and crashed at the Sepulveda Dam recreational area in Encino, Los Angeles, several miles short of the airport. It is surmised that, at the last moment, Powers noticed children playing in the area and directed the helicopter elsewhere to avoid landing on them. He might have landed safely if not for this last-second deviation, which compromised his autorotative descent.

=== 3 ===
- Alfred Lunt, 84, American actor and director, he was nominated for the Academy Award for Best Actor for his role as "the Actor" in the pre-Code infidelity-themed comedy film The Guardsman (1931), death caused by cancer.
- Makarios III, 63, Greek-Cypriot prelate and politician, he served as the archbishop of Cyprus from 1950 until his death in office in 1977,he also twice served as the President of Cyprus (1960-1974, 1974-1977), death caused by a heart attack.

=== 4 ===
- Edgar Adrian, 1st Baron Adrian, 87, English electrophysiologist.he provided experimental evidence for the all-or-none law of nerves.

=== 5 ===
- Charles Carson, 91, British actor and civil engineer,his theatre work included directed plays for the Entertainments National Service Association (ENSA) during World War II.

=== 6 ===
- Alexander Bustamante, 93, Jamaican politician,.in 1953, Bustamante became Jamaica's first chief minister, gaining the pre-independence title for the head of government, after Jamaica was granted independence in 1962, Bustamante served as the country's first prime minister until 1967. In April 1963 he ordered the police and army to "Bring in all Rastas, dead or alive" and over 150 Rastas were detained and an unknown number were killed. In 1965, after suffering a stroke, Bustamante withdrew from active participation in public life. The true power was held by his deputy, Donald Sangster.

=== 9 ===
- Edward Chapman, 75, English actor, he is chiefly remembered for his role as Mr William Grimsdale, the officious superior and comic foil to Norman Wisdom's character of Norman Pitkin in many of his films from the late 1950s and the 1960s.
- Beryl May Dent, 77, English mathematical physicist, technical librarian, and computer programmer, working on early analogue and digital computers to solve electrical engineering problems,; with Brian Birtwistle, she wrote programs for the Ferranti Mark 1 (Mark 1) computer at the University of Manchester, which demonstrated that high-speed digital computers could provide considerable assistance to the electrical design engineer,the cause of death was not specified in news reports. She died at Worthing Hospital after a long period of disablement.

=== 10 ===
- Vince Barnett, 75, American actor, a 1932 newspaper report noted that "Barnett for years [was] known in Hollywood as the 'professional ribber' -- appearing at banquets and parties as a paid 'insulter'", he would insult the guests in a thick German accent, spill the soup, and drop the trays—all to the great delight of hosts who enjoyed watching their friends squirm and mutter "Who hired that jerk?" Wrote author Ephraim Katz, "Among the celebrated 'victims' of his practical jokes were President Franklin D. Roosevelt, Winston Churchill, George Bernard Shaw, Henry Ford, and Charles Lindbergh", death caused by heart disease.

=== 11 ===
- John Howard Lawson, 82, American playwright, screenwriter, arts critic, and cultural historian,.in 1933, Lawson helped to organize the Screen Writers Guild and became its first president,in 1947, Lawson was one of the Hollywood Ten, the initial group of American film industry professionals to appear before the United States Congress as part of an investigation into communist influence in Hollywood,; because Lawson and the other nine screenwriters and directors refused to answer questions about their alleged Communist Party affiliation, they were cited for contempt of Congress,; in 1948, Lawson was sentenced to a year in prison; he began serving his sentence in 1950,; when he was released from prison, he found himself blacklisted by the film studios. While banned from working in Hollywood, Lawson continued to explore, from a Marxist perspective, the theoretical foundations of drama and cinema. He expanded his 1936 work Theory and Technique of Playwriting into Theory and Technique of Playwriting and Screenwriting (1949), and revised it again for a 1960 edition.

=== 13 ===
- Henry Williamson, 81, English novelist, he is primarily remembered for the xenofiction novel Tarka the Otter (1927), which won the Hawthornden Prize in 1927, and has never been out of print,Williamson was opposed to war and believed that wars were caused by Jewish "usurial moneyed interests", he was attracted to Oswald Mosley's British Union of Fascists and joined the party in 1937,death related to the effects pf dementia on him, he spend his last days in a hospice at Twyford Abbey.

=== 14 ===
- Alexander Luria, 75, Soviet neuropsychologist,he is often credited as the father of modern neuropsychology,during the 1960s, at the height of the Cold War, Luria's career expanded significantly with the publication of several new books, of special note was the publication in 1962 of Higher Cortical Functions in Man and Their Impairment Caused by Local Brain Damage, the book has been translated into multiple foreign languages and has been recognized as the principal book establishing Neuropsychology as a medical discipline in its own right, death caused by a myocardial infarction.
- George Oppenheimer, 77, American screenwriter, playwright, and drama critic,following a number of successes in Broadway theatre, he left for Hollywood to work as a screenwriter, he co-wrote the Marx Brothers film A Day at the Races (1937), a career milestone was his nomination for the Best Original Screenplay for The War Against Mrs. Hadley (1942),Oppenheimer was a known homosexual, who never married, he was the occasional sexual partner of the gay rights activist, communist, and labor advocate Harry Hay.

=== 15 ===
- Lou Walters, 83, British-born American booking agent, theatrical producer and the founder of the nightclub Latin Quarter,in 1942, Walters opened the Latin Quarter nightclub on Times Square in Midtown Manhattan, the club was extremely popular, and in its first year grossed over $1.5 million, over 5 million people visited the nightclub during its first ten years in operation,death caused by a heart attack.

=== 16 ===
- Elvis Presley, 42, American singer and actor, as the catalyst for the cultural revolution that was rock and roll, he was central not only to defining it as a musical genre but in making it a touchstone of youth culture and rebellious attitude,with its racially mixed origins, repeatedly affirmed by Presley himself, rock and roll's occupation of a central position in mainstream American culture facilitated a new acceptance and appreciation of black culture, while an autopsy, undertaken the same day Presley died, was still in progress, the Memphis medical examiner Jerry Francisco announced that the immediate cause of death was cardiac arrest and declared that "drugs played no role in Presley's death". The pathologists conducting the autopsy considered it possible that Presley had suffered "anaphylactic shock brought on by the codeine pills he had gotten from his dentist, to which he was known to have had a mild allergy". Lab reports filed two months later strongly suggested that polypharmacy was the primary cause of death; one reported "fourteen drugs in Elvis' system, ten in significant quantity". In 1979, the forensic pathologist Cyril Wecht reviewed the reports and concluded that a combination of depressants had resulted in Presley's accidental death. The forensic historian and pathologist Michael Baden viewed the situation as complicated: "Elvis had an enlarged heart for a long time. That, together with his drug habit, caused his death. But he was difficult to diagnose; it was a judgment call."

=== 17 ===
- Delmer Daves, 73, American film director, screenwriter, and film producer,on medical advice, Daves had decided to forgo Westerns in the late 1950s and to limit himself to studio-bound productions which were less strenuous to direct, he wrote, produced and directed a series of romantic dramas at Warner Bros. Pictures which all starred Troy Donahue: A Summer Place (1959), Parrish (1961), Susan Slade (1961) and Rome Adventure (1962),as a director, Daves first built his reputation on morally complex war films and socially progressive Westerns. For example, Broken Arrow (1950) has been credited as one of the first Westerns to introduce the issue of racism in post-war American films, and it is widely regarded as one of the first "pro-Native American" films.
- Roger Nicolas, 58, French actor, singer, and comedian,he starred in several films during the 1950s.

=== 19 ===
- Peter Dyneley, 56, English and Canadian actor and bass,thanks to his Canadian upbringing, Dyneley frequently performed with a North American accent, he acted primarily in stage productions prior to 1954, including in a Broadway revival of George Bernard Shaw's The Millionairess (1936),he voiced the countdown for the opening sequence of the science fiction television series Thunderbirds in 1964.
- Groucho Marx, 86, American vaudevillian, comedian, actor, comic vocalist and game show host, a member of the comedy troupe Marx Brothers, Groucho was a master of the one-line retort, and he is considered one of the greatest comedians of the United States,he was the host of the quiz/interview show You Bet Your Life,death caused by pneumonia. He was hospitalized with pneumonia at the Cedars-Sinai Medical Center since late June, 1977.

=== 20 ===
- Eddy Waller, 88, American actor,Waller appeared in more than 250 sound films between 1929 and 1963, Thomas M. Feramisco, in his book, The Mummy Unwrapped: Scenes Left on Universal's Cutting Room, has Waller "making the move to celluloid in 1936."

=== 21 ===
- Danny Lockin, 34, American actor and dancer, he made his Broadway debut on April 8, 1964, in the musical West Side Story in the role of Gee-Tar, and appeared as an actor and dancer in a regional production of Take Me Along,Lockin was fatally stabbed and then bled to death. His body had been stabbed 100 times,and was then posthumously mutilated.

=== 22 ===
- Alex Segal, 62, American television director, television producer, and film director,in 1948, Segal became a production assistant at the network American Broadcasting Company (ABC), working for $50 per week,he went on to direct more than 25 different television programs for ABC, including The Billy Daniels Show, and The United States Steel Hour,during one of his hiatuses from television productions, Segal took a teaching position for one year at the University of Montana.
- Vimi, 34, Indian actress, following her roles in a few box office failures, she was reduced to posing for photoshoots in magazines and soon went into oblivion,death due to liver disease, in turn caused by alcohol consumption.

=== 23 ===
- Sebastian Cabot, 59, British actor and voice performer in several Disney animated films, he voiced Sir Ector in The Sword in the Stone (1963)and Bagheera in The Jungle Book (1967),death caused by a stroke.

=== 27 ===
- George Merritt, 86, English actor, often cast in authoritarian roles,he studied German theatre in Magdeburg, Province of Saxony, and he was teaching at the Berlitz School at the outbreak of the First World War, when he was held as a British Civil Prisoner of War, and interned at the Ruhleben internment camp, 1914–1918. He was involved in over 50 plays produced at Ruhleben.

=== 29 ===
- Jean Hagen, 54, American actress, she was nomitated for the Academy Award for Best Supporting Actress for her role as Lina Lamont in musical romantic comedy Singin' in the Rain (1952),she was nominated for three Primetime Emmy Awards for playing Margaret Williams on the first three seasons (1953–1956) of the television sitcom The Danny Thomas Show,death caused by esophageal cancer.

=== 30 ===
- Selma Vaz Dias, 65, Dutch-born British actress, writer, and painter,she played Solange in the two British premières of Jean Genet's The Maids (the first, given in French, the second, in English) in 1952 and 1956 respectively, she also played the lead role of the brothel madam Irma in the world première of Genet's The Balcony (1957), produced in a "private theatre club" which enabled the production to circumvent the Lord Chamberlain Roger Lumley, 11th Earl of Scarbrough's ban on public performances of the play.

=== 31 ===
- Joseph Mell, 62, American actor,he was known for starring as Burt Stone in the drama film The Ski Bum (1971).
- Rick Vallin, 57, American actor,he portrayed the tabloid reporter Barry Brown in the serial film Batman and Robin (1949).

=== Specific date unknown ===
- Louis Cazeneuve, 68 or 69, Argentine-born American comic-book artist,Cazeneuve's earliest work includes Fox Feature Syndicate's 1940 comic strip Blue Beetle, where he succeeded Jack Kirby under the house name Charles Nicholas,he co-created the original version of Red Raven in the eponymous one-shot Red Raven Comics #1 (cover-dated August 1940), published by Marvel Comics' predecessor, Timely Comics, during the Golden Age of Comic Books,he is better known for working on two features for DC Comics, he succeeded creator Creig Flessel on the modern-day Arthurian feature Shining Knight, drawing the feature for nearly three years in Adventure Comics #73-101 (April 1942 - January 1945). More prominently, he became the second artist of the enduring character Aquaman, succeeding artist co-creator Paul Norris to become the longest-running artist of the undersea hero's Golden Age adventures. Cazeneuve debuted on Aquaman in More Fun Comics #82 (August 1942), and continued with the feature through issue #107 (February 1946), and its subsequent move to Adventure Comics #103-117, 119-120, 124 (April 1946 - June 1947, August-September 1947, January 1948).

== Sources ==
- Baden, Michael M.; Hennessee, Judith Adler (1990). Unnatural Death: Confessions of a Medical Examiner. Ballantine. ISBN 978-0-8041-0599-6.
- Bertrand, Michael T. (2000). Race, Rock, and Elvis. University of Illinois Press. ISBN 978-0-252-02586-0.
- Birtwistle, Brian; — (April 1956). "The digital computer as an aid to the electrical design engineer". Proceedings of the Institution of Electrical Engineers. Part B. Radio and Electronic Engineering. 103 (1S). London: Institution of Electrical Engineers: 47–53. doi:10.1049/pi-b-1.1956.0008. ISSN 2054-0434. Paper No. 2092 M. "The paper was first received 30 January 1956, and in revised form, 5 March 1956. It was published in March 1956 and was read at the Convention on Digital‑Computer Techniques on 10 April 1956."
- Goble, Alan. The Complete Index to Literary Sources in Film. Walter de Gruyter, 1999.
- Guralnick, Peter; Jorgensen, Ernst (1999). Elvis Day by Day: The Definitive Record of His Life and Music. Ballantine. ISBN 978-0-345-42089-3.
- Homskaya, E. (2001). Alexander Romanovich Luria: A Scientific Biography, New York, NY: Plenum Publishers, ISBN 978-0-3064-6494-2.
- Kurtti, Jeff (1996). The Great Movie Musical Trivia Book. New York: Applause. ISBN 978-1-55783-222-1.
- Dieter Nohlen & Philip Stöver (2010) Elections in Europe: A data handbook, p438 ISBN 978-3-8329-5609-7
- Ramsland, Katherine (2010). "Cyril Wecht: Forensic Pathologist – Coverup for a King". TruTV. Archived from the original on November 5, 2013.
- Sadie, Stanley, ed. (1994). The Norton/Grove Concise Encyclopedia of Music (Revised ed.). W. W. Norton. ISBN 978-0-393-03753-1.
