= Randal Keynes =

British humanist (1948–2023)

Randal Keynes OBE, FLS
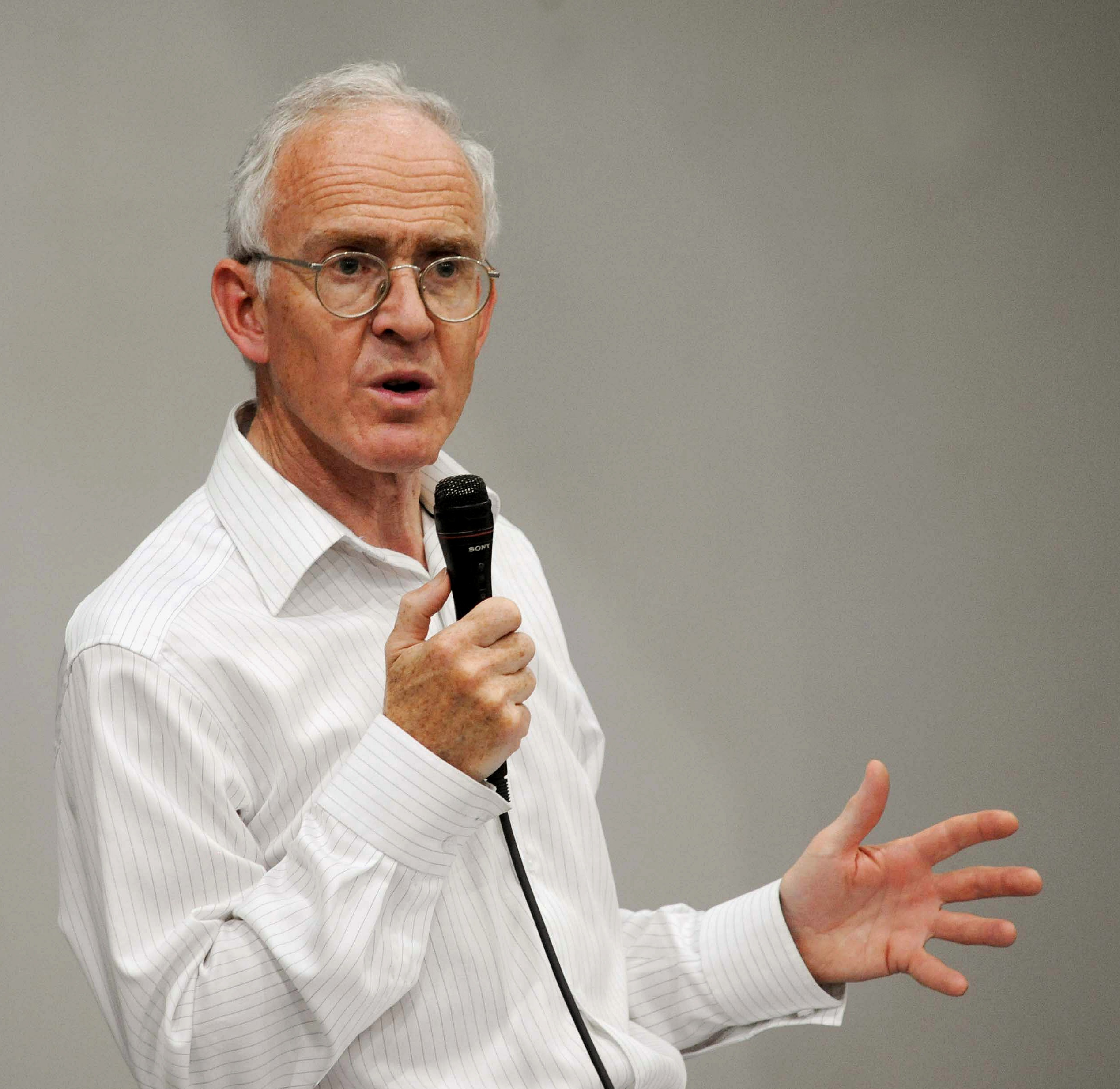
- Keynes in 2009
- Born: Randal Hume Keynes; 29 July 1948; Cambridge, England
- Died: 3 March 2023 (aged 74)
- Education: Marlborough College
- Alma mater: New College, Oxford (BA)
- Occupations: Conservationist, author
- Spouse: Zelfa Hourani
- Children: Soumaya Keynes; Skandar Keynes
- Parent(s): Richard Keynes; Hon. Anne Adrian
- Relatives: Edgar Adrian, 1st Baron Adrian (grandfather); Hester Adrian, Baroness Adrian (grandmother); Charles Darwin (great-great-grandfather)
- Family: Keynes

Randal Hume Keynes, OBE, FLS (/ˈkeɪnz/ KAYNZ; 29 July 1948 – 3 March 2023) was a British conservationist, author, and great-great-grandson of Charles Darwin.

== Family background ==
Keynes was born in Cambridge, England. He was the son of the Hon. Anne Pinsent (née Adrian) and physiologist Richard Keynes. His maternal grandparents were Hester Adrian, Baroness Adrian, mental health worker, and Edgar Adrian, 1st Baron Adrian, electrophysiologist and recipient of the 1932 Nobel Prize for Physiology. His paternal grandfather was the surgeon Geoffrey Keynes, brother to the economist John Maynard Keynes. Randal Keynes was the brother of two Cambridge professors, Simon (historian) and Roger (medical scientist).

Randal Keynes had two children with Zelfa Cecil Hourani, also from a prominent intellectual family, originally from Lebanon. Hourani's father, Cecil, was an advisor to the late Tunisian president Habib Bourguiba, and his two brothers were Albert, a major historian of the Middle East, and George, philosopher, historian, and classicist. Randal and Zelfa's son, Skandar Keynes (born 1991), is a political advisor and former actor best known for his role as Edmund Pevensie in the Narnia films. Their daughter, Soumaya Keynes (born 1989), is an economics journalist and has hosted podcasts for The Economist and Financial Times.

== Life and career ==
Keynes was educated at Marlborough College and New College, Oxford, where he earned a degree in English with a concentration in Icelandic literature. He was a distinguished supporter of Humanists UK.

He campaigned successfully against the redevelopment of King's Cross station and for the preservation of the Caledonian Road neighbourhood in central London. He recalls one of the turning points as his persuasion of two members of the House of Lords to ask the government to guarantee the funding of the project; when the ministers declined to, the bill fell.

== The Darwin connection ==
Keynes was the author of the intimate exploration of his famous ancestry, Annie's Box, subtitled Darwin, His Daughter, and Human Evolution (2001), a book about the relationship between Darwin and his daughter Annie, whose early death deeply affected him. The 2009 film Creation is based on this book.

He took a leading role in the campaign to have Down House, Darwin's former home, designated a World Heritage Site.

He was the author of two Oxford Dictionary of National Biography articles on Anne Darwin and William Erasmus Darwin in 2005.

== Ancestry ==
Ancestors of Randal Keynes

16. Dr. John Keynes
8. John Neville Keynes
17. Anna Maynard Neville
4. Sir Geoffrey Keynes
18. Rev. John Brown
9. Florence Ada Brown
19. Ada Haydon Ford
2. Richard Keynes
20. Charles Darwin
10. George Darwin
21. Emma Wedgwood
5. Margaret Elizabeth Darwin
22. Charles Meredith du Puy
11. Maud du Puy
23. Ellen Reynolds
1. Randal Keynes
24. Emperor Adrian
12. Alfred Douglas Adrian
25. Selina Anne Douglas
6. Edgar Adrian, 1st Baron Adrian
26. Charles Howard Barton
13. Flora Lavinia Barton
27. Amelia Swaine
3. Hon. Anne Adrian
28. Richard Steele Pinsent
14. Hume Chancellor Pinsent
29. Catherine Agnes Ross
7. Hester Agnes Pinsent
30. Rev. Richard Parker
15. Ellen Frances Parker
31. Elizabeth Coffin

== See also ==
- Keynes family
