= Richard Adrian, 2nd Baron Adrian =

British peer and physiologist (1927–1995)

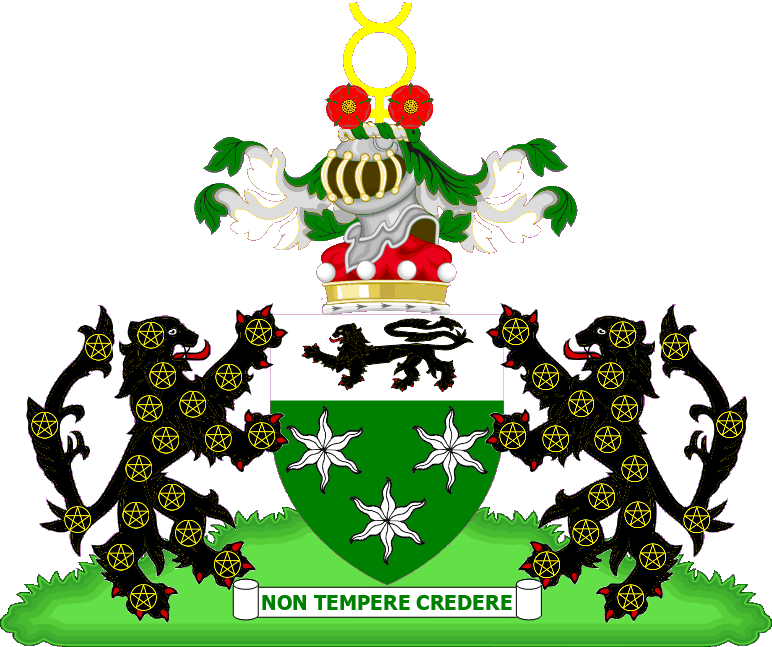
Coat of arms

Richard Hume Adrian, 2nd Baron Adrian FRS (16 October 1927 – 4 April 1995) was a British peer and physiologist.

== Personal life ==
Richard Hume Adrian was born in Cambridge in 1927, as the only son of Edgar Adrian, 1st Baron Adrian and his wife, Hester Agnes Pinsent, a mental health worker. His older sister, Anne Pinsent Adrian, married the physiologist Richard Keynes (a direct descendant of Charles Darwin) while his twin sister, Jennet Adrian, married Peter Watson Campbel.

Adrian's father won a Nobel Prize in 1932, was President of the Royal Society 1950–1955 and was created Baron Adrian in 1955.

In 1967 he married Lucy Caroe, historical geographer. She was the daughter of the architect Alban Caroe and her grandfathers were W. D. Caröe and William Bragg. They had no children, and on his death in 1995, the title Baron Adrian became extinct.

He was the great-uncle of Skandar Keynes, who had a leading role in the Chronicles of Narnia films.

== Career ==
Richard Adrian was educated at Swarthmore College and Westminster School, followed by reading medicine at Trinity College, Cambridge, and University College, London. He pursued advanced research into cellular physiology, becoming Professor of Cell Physiology at Cambridge University in 1978. He was a fellow of Corpus Christi College, Cambridge (1955–61) and Churchill College, Cambridge (1961-81) and was Master of Pembroke College, Cambridge from 1981 to 1992. He also served a term as Vice-Chancellor of Cambridge University. Adrian was elected a Fellow of the Royal Society for his contributions to physiology in 1977. In 1987, he was elected to the American Philosophical Society.

In 1977 he became the second Baron Adrian after the death of his father. He was active in politics in the House of Lords, sitting as a cross-bencher. He was a trustee of a number of national institutions, including the British Museum and the British Library.

== Arms ==
Coat of arms of Richard Adrian, 2nd Baron Adrian

Crest
The astronomical sign of Mercury Or between two roses Gules barbed and seeded Proper.
Escutcheon
Vert three estoiles Argent on a chief Argent a lion passant Sable.
Supporters
On either side a lion Sable semee of pentacles Or.
Motto
Non Tempere Credere

Academic offices
Preceded by W. A. Camps	Master of Pembroke College, Cambridge; 1981–1992	Succeeded by Roger Tomkys
Preceded by John Butterfield, Baron Butterfield	Vice-Chancellor of the University of Cambridge; 1985–1987	Succeeded by Michael McCrum
Peerage of the United Kingdom
Preceded by Edgar Adrian	Baron Adrian; 1977–1995	Extinct
