= Legal archaeology =

Analysis of historical legal cases

Legal archaeology is an area of legal scholarship "involving detailed historical reconstruction and analysis of important cases."

While most legal scholars confine their research to published opinions of court cases, legal archaeologists examine the historical and social context in which a court case was decided. These facts may show what social and cultural forces were at work in a particular case. Professors can use legal archaeology to "sensitize students as to how inequality, specifically with regard to race, gender and class affects what occurs throughout the cases they study." A legal archaeologist may also research biographical material on the judges, attorneys, and parties to a court case. Such information may show whether a judge held particular biases in a case, or whether one party had superior legal representation that caused the party to prevail in a case.

== Notable practitioners of legal archaeology ==
- Richard Danzig
- Judith Maute
- Debora Threedy
- Joan Vogel
