= The Chronicles of Narnia: The Lion, the Witch and the Wardrobe =

2005 film by Andrew Adamson

- Theatrical release poster
- Directed by: Andrew Adamson
- Screenplay by: Ann Peacock; Andrew Adamson; Christopher Markus Stephen McFeely
- Based on: The Lion, the Witch and the Wardrobe by C. S. Lewis
- Produced by: Mark Johnson; Phillip Steuer
- Starring: Georgie Henley; Skandar Keynes; William Moseley; Anna Popplewell; Tilda Swinton; James McAvoy; Jim Broadbent; Liam Neeson
- Cinematography: Donald McAlpine
- Edited by: Sim Evan-Jones; Jim May
- Music by: Harry Gregson-Williams
- Production companies: Walt Disney Pictures; Walden Media; Mark Johnson Productions
- Distributed by: Buena Vista Pictures Distribution
- Release dates: 7 December 2005 (Royal Film Performance); 8 December 2005 (United Kingdom); 9 December 2005 (United States)
- Running time: 143 minutes
- Countries: United Kingdom; United States
- Language: English
- Budget: $180 million
- Box office: $745 million

The Chronicles of Narnia: The Lion, the Witch and the Wardrobe is a 2005 high fantasy film directed by Andrew Adamson, who co-wrote the screenplay with Ann Peacock and the writing team of Christopher Markus and Stephen McFeely. It is based on the 1950 novel The Lion, the Witch and the Wardrobe, the first published and second chronological novel in the children's book series The Chronicles of Narnia by C. S. Lewis. The film is the first installment in The Chronicles of Narnia film series. It was produced by Walt Disney Pictures and Walden Media, and distributed by Buena Vista Pictures Distribution.

William Moseley, Anna Popplewell, Skandar Keynes, and Georgie Henley play Peter, Susan, Edmund, and Lucy Pevensie, four British children evacuated during the Blitz to the countryside, who find a wardrobe that leads to the fantasy world of Narnia, where they ally with the lion Aslan (voiced by Liam Neeson) against the forces of Jadis, the White Witch (Tilda Swinton).

The Chronicles of Narnia: The Lion, the Witch and the Wardrobe premiered on 7 December 2005, selected for the Royal Film Performance, before it was theatrically released on 8 December in the United Kingdom and 9 December in the United States. The film was a critical and commercial success, grossing $745 million worldwide against a $180 million budget and becoming the third-highest-grossing film of 2005. An extended edition was released on 12 December 2006, on DVD. Combining both releases of the film, in regular and extended edition, it was the third-best-selling and first-highest-grossing DVD in North America in 2006, taking in $332.7 million that year. At the 78th Academy Awards, the film won for Best Makeup and was nominated for Best Sound Mixing and Best Visual Effects, while at the 59th BAFTA Awards, it won for Best Makeup and Hair and was nominated for Best Costume Design and Best Special Visual Effects. The score was nominated for Best Original Score and the song "Wunderkind" by Alanis Morissette was nominated for Best Original Song at the 63rd Golden Globe Awards. The score was also nominated for Best Score Soundtrack Album for Motion Picture, Television or Other Visual Media and the song "Can't Take It In" by Imogen Heap was nominated for Best Song Written For Motion Picture, Television or Other Visual Media at the 49th Grammy Awards.

The Lion, the Witch and the Wardrobe was followed by Prince Caspian in 2008 and The Voyage of the Dawn Treader in 2010 to diminishing critical and financial reception. Nevertheless, the three films grossed a total of $1.5 billion worldwide.

== Plot ==
In September 1940, after surviving the Blitz during World War II, the Pevensie children – Peter, Susan, Edmund, and Lucy – are evacuated from London, England to the country home of Professor Kirke.

During a game of hide-and-seek, Lucy discovers a wardrobe and hides inside, only to find that she has entered a magical winter world. She encounters a faun named Mr. Tumnus, who tells her she is in Narnia. Tumnus lulls Lucy to sleep by playing a flute lullaby. When she wakes up, he explains that he had intended to betray her to the White Witch, Jadis, who has cursed Narnia to an eternal winter with no Christmas; any humans encountered are to be brought to her. Instead, Tumnus sends Lucy back home through the wardrobe, where she finds that hardly any time has passed in the real world.

Lucy later goes back through the wardrobe. Edmund follows her but encounters Jadis, who claims to be the Queen of Narnia, and her servant, Ginarrbrik, and tells her about Tumnus. Jadis offers him Turkish delight and kingship if he brings his siblings to her. In the real world, Lucy shares with Peter and Susan about Narnia, but Edmund spitefully betrays her by pretending Lucy only imagined it. Professor Kirke, however, suggests Lucy is telling the truth.

After accidentally breaking a window, the siblings flee the housekeeper through the wardrobe and enter Narnia. Peter chastises Edmund for lying about Lucy and forces him to apologize to her. They discover that Jadis has captured Tumnus as Edmund unintentionally turned him in to her. They meet a pair of talking beavers, who say Aslan, the true King of Narnia, plans to return and regain control of Narnia, and that there is a prophecy that when two sons of Adam and two daughters of Eve sit on the thrones of Cair Paravel, Jadis' reign will end.

Edmund sneaks off to visit Jadis, but she is furious that he came without his siblings. She sends wolves led by Maugrim to find the children, and Edmund is imprisoned, where he meets Tumnus. The children and beavers escape, and Jadis turns Tumnus to stone.

Peter, Susan, Lucy, and the beavers encounter Father Christmas, a sign that Jadis's power is weakening. He gives them tools to defend themselves — Lucy receives a dagger and a cordial that can heal any injury; Susan a magical horn and a bow with a quiver of arrows; and Peter a sword and shield. After evading Jadis' wolves, the group reaches Aslan's camp, where he is revealed to be a lion. Maugrim and a wolf ambush Lucy and Susan, but Peter kills Maugrim. Aslan's troops chase the fleeing wolf scout and rescue Edmund.

Jadis journeys to Aslan's camp to claim Edmund as a traitor due to a blood contract law, but Aslan secretly offers himself instead. That night, Lucy and Susan witness Jadis killing Aslan at the Stone Table and deploy an army to prepare for war. Unbeknownst to all except for Susan and Lucy, Aslan is resurrected, citing magic beyond Jadis' understanding, and takes the sisters to Jadis' castle to free the numerous petrified Narnians there.

Upon learning of Aslan's death, Edmund urges Peter to lead. Both armies clash, with Jadis' army nearly overwhelming Peter and Edmund's. Edmund is mortally wounded after breaking Jadis' wand while saving Peter. Aslan arrives with the army of restored Narnians from Jadis' castle, and personally kills Jadis. Susan shoots Ginarrbrik as the latter attempts to finish off Edmund, and Lucy heals Edmund with her cordial. The Pevensies are crowned King Peter the Magnificent, Queen Susan the Gentle, King Edmund the Just, and Queen Lucy the Valiant.

Fifteen years later, the siblings, now adults, pursue a white stag. They find the lamppost Lucy first encountered in Narnia. They cross back through the wardrobe, becoming children again since little time has passed. Professor Kirke asks why they were in the wardrobe. Peter says he wouldn't believe them, and he responds, "Try me."

In a mid-credit scene, Lucy attempts to use the wardrobe again, but Professor Kirke tells her he has also tried, and they will probably return to Narnia when they least expect it.

== Cast ==
- Georgie Henley as Lucy Pevensie, the youngest of the four Pevensie children.
  - Rachael Henley (Henley's real-life sister) as Adult Lucy Pevensie, who has grown up as a queen in Narnia.
- Skandar Keynes as Edmund Pevensie, the third-eldest of the four Pevensie children.
  - Mark Wells as Adult Edmund Pevensie, who has grown up as a king in Narnia.
- William Moseley as Peter Pevensie, the eldest of the four Pevensie children.
  - Noah Huntley as Adult Peter Pevensie, who has grown up as a king in Narnia.
- Anna Popplewell as Susan Pevensie, the second-eldest child of the four Pevensie children.
  - Sophie Winkleman as Adult Susan Pevensie, who has grown up as a queen in Narnia.
- Liam Neeson as the voice of Aslan, the great lion who was responsible for creating Narnia.
- Tilda Swinton as Jadis, the White Witch, an evil, power-hungry sorceress who holds Narnia under an eternal winter without Christmas or other seasons.
- James McAvoy as Mr. Tumnus, a faun who at first works for Jadis, but befriends Lucy Pevensie and joins Aslan's forces.
- Jim Broadbent as Professor Digory Kirke, an old professor. He lets the children stay at his country estate during the war.
- Ray Winstone as the voice of Mr. Beaver, a beaver who helps lead the children to Aslan.
- Dawn French as the voice of Mrs. Beaver, a beaver who helps lead the children to Aslan.
- Kiran Shah as Ginarrbrik, Jadis' servant dwarf.
- Elizabeth Hawthorne as Mrs. Macready, Kirke's strict housekeeper.
- James Cosmo as Father Christmas. He gives Peter, Susan, and Lucy their Christmas gifts.
- Michael Madsen as the voice of Maugrim, a wolf who is captain of Jadis' secret police. (uncredited)
- Patrick Kake as General Oreius, a centaur who is second-in-command of Aslan's army.
- Shane Rangi as General Otmin, a minotaur who is second-in-command of Jadis' army
- Morris Cupton as Train Guard, the guard of the train Peter, Susan, Edmund and Lucy ride.
- Judy McIntosh as Helen Pevensie, the mother of the four Pevensie children.
- Rupert Everett as the voice of Mr. Fox, a fox who helps the children along their way to Aslan.
- Producer Philip Steuer voices Phillip, Edmund's talking horse.

The radio-announcer that Peter listens to on the rainy day near the beginning of the film is played by Douglas Gresham, co-producer of the movie and C. S. Lewis's stepson. Keynes' voice broke during filming, so some of his voice track had to be re-looped by his sister Soumaya. Christopher Pevensie, the father of the four Pevensie children, is only glimpsed in a photo which Edmund tries to retrieve during the bombing, which is of Sim-Evan Jones's father.

With the exception of Tilda Swinton, who was the first choice to play Jadis, the White Witch, casting was a long process. Beginning in 2002, Adamson went through 2,500 audition tapes, met 1,800 children and workshopped 400 before coming down to the final four actors for the Pevensies. Moseley and Popplewell came from the very start of casting, whilst Henley and Keynes were cast relatively late. Moseley was cast because casting director Pippa Hall remembered she cast him as an extra in Cider with Rosie (1998). He beat 3,000 boys to the role of Peter and quit school to learn all his lines.

Aslan's voice was a contention point. Brian Cox was originally cast in the role on 9 December 2004, but Adamson changed his mind. Liam Neeson sought out the role, and was announced as the voice on 17 July 2005.

== Production ==
=== Pre-production ===
During the early 1990s, producers Frank Marshall and Kathleen Kennedy were planning a film version. They could not find a space in Britain to shoot the film during 1996, and their plans to set the film in modern times made Douglas Gresham oppose the film, in addition to his feeling that technology had yet to catch up. Perry Moore began negotiations with the C. S. Lewis estate in 2000. On 7 December 2001, Walden Media announced that they had acquired the rights to The Chronicles of Narnia. Walden Media discussed with many directors to helm the Narnia films, including Rob Minkoff, John Boorman, and David Fincher. On 1 March 2004, The Walt Disney Studios entered into a deal with Walden Media to co-produce and finance the film and all future Narnia films under the Walt Disney Pictures banner.

The success of Harry Potter and the Philosopher's Stone prompted the producers to feel they could make a faithful adaptation of the novel set in Britain. "Harry Potter came along, and all those cultural or geographical lines were broken," Mark Johnson explained. "When The Lion, The Witch and the Wardrobe was being developed at Paramount, the imperative was to set it in the U.S., and it just doesn't hold. [...] It's not the book." Guillermo del Toro turned down the offer to direct due to his commitment on Pan's Labyrinth. Following an Academy Award win for Shrek, director Andrew Adamson began adapting the source material with a 20-page treatment based on his memories of the book. As such the film begins with the Luftwaffe bombing and concludes with an enormous battle, although they do not take up as much time in the novel.

In the novel, the battle is not seen until Aslan, Susan, Lucy and their reinforcements arrive. This was changed in the movie because Adamson said he could vividly remember a huge battle, an example of how Lewis left a lot to the readers' imagination. Other small changes include the reason all four children come to Narnia, in that an accident breaks a window and forces them to hide. Tumnus also never meets Edmund until the end of the novel. Minor details were added to the Pevensies, such as their mother's name, Helen, being the actual first name of Georgie Henley's mother. Finchley as the home of the Pevensies was inspired by Anna Popplewell, who actually is from Finchley. Adamson also changed the circumstances in which Lucy first comes into Narnia. He felt it was more natural that she first see the wardrobe while looking for a hide-and-seek hiding place, rather than just chance upon it exploring the house. The film also hints at Professor Kirke's role in The Magician's Nephew, such as the engravings on the wardrobe, when it is a simple one in the novel, and the Professor's surprise and intrigue when Peter and Susan mention Lucy's discovery in the wardrobe. When Lewis wrote the novel, it was the first of the series, and the back-story later outlined by the subsequent books in the series did not exist. Additionally, in the novel, the father of the Pevensie children is in London with their mother, but in the film, their father is fighting in the war as Lucy states to Mr. Tumnus when they first meet in Narnia.

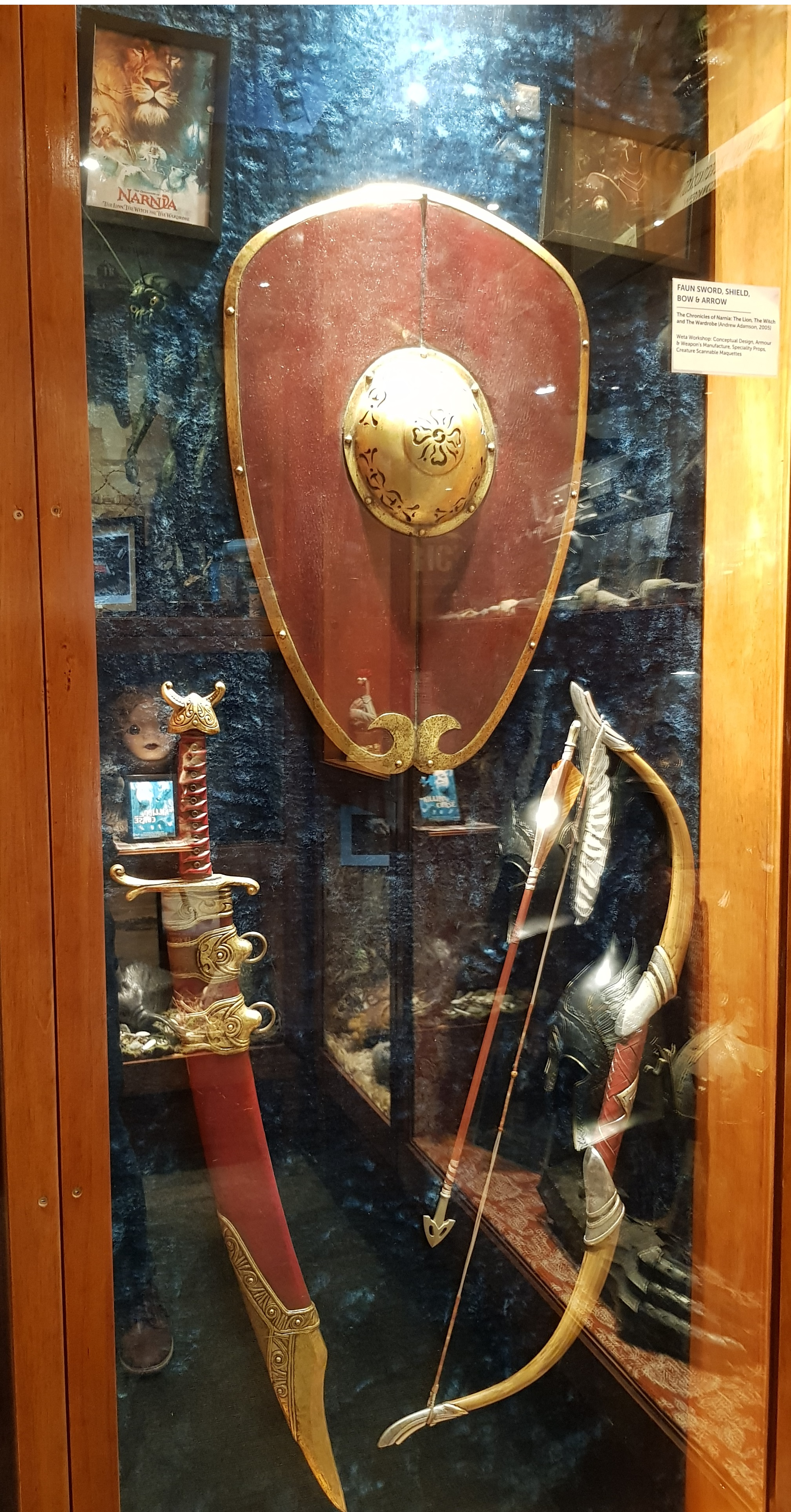
Weapon props from the film at Weta Cave

Wētā Workshop head Richard Taylor cited Hieronymus Bosch's The Garden of Earthly Delights as an inspiration on the film. He felt Narnia had to be less dark and gritty than their depiction of Middle-earth in The Lord of the Rings because it is a new world. Many of Weta's creature designs were designed for digital creation, so when Howard Berger and KNB FX inherited the practical effects work, they had to spend three months retooling approved designs for animatronics. Berger's children would comment and advise upon his designs; they suggested the White Witch's hair be changed from black to blonde, which Berger concurred with as he realized Swinton's wig looked too Gothic.

=== Filming ===
Principal photography began in New Zealand on 28 June 2004, shooting in a primarily chronological order. Adamson did this in order to naturally create a sense of mature development from his young actors, which mirrored their real-life development. Georgie Henley and Skandar Keynes were never shown the set before filming scenes of their characters entering Narnia, nor had Henley seen James McAvoy in his Mr. Tumnus costume before shooting their scenes together.

The first scene shot was at the former RNZAF Base Hobsonville for the railway scene. Afterwards, they shot the Blitz scene, which Adamson called their first formal day of shooting.

The filmmakers asked permission to bring in twelve reindeer to New Zealand to pull the White Witch's sledge. They were denied by the Ministry of Agriculture and Forestry, citing the potentially deadly Q fever, from which the North American reindeer population suffers, as the reason. However, ten wolves and wolf hybrids were allowed in for filming in Auckland. To replace the denied live reindeer, Mark Rappaport's Creature Effects, Inc. created four animatronic reindeer that were used in shots where the deer were standing in place. The reindeer were designed with replaceable skins to get the most usage; brown for those of Father Christmas and white for those of the White Witch.

The cast and crew spent their time in New Zealand in Auckland before moving in November to the South Island. Shooting locations in the South Island included Flock Hill in Canterbury, the area known as Elephant Rocks near Duntroon in North Otago, which was transformed into Aslan's camp. The castle scene was filmed in Purakaunui Bay, in the Catlins district, not far from the most southern point in New Zealand.

They filmed in the Czech Republic (Prague and České Švýcarsko National Park), Slovenia and Poland after the Christmas break, before wrapping in February.

=== Post-production ===
The film was edited by Jim May and Sim Evan-Jones. Jones states that he really liked the problem solving that one can do with editing. According to Sim, "The way you can just take stuff and sort it out and be the keeper of the story without having to interact with actors, crew and reign" drew him to film editing. A sequence where several creatures are set on fire was reportedly removed to secure a PG rating from the Motion Picture Association of America's rating board.

Jim May had worked at several visual effects facilities—Rhythm & Hues Studios, Industrial Light & Magic (ILM) and Sony Pictures Imageworks—and eventually, moved into feature editorial as the visual effects editor in the cutting room.

=== Music ===
The soundtrack was composed and conducted by Harry Gregson-Williams, having previously worked with Adamson on Shrek (2001) and Shrek 2 (2004). In addition there are three original songs in the film; "Can't Take It In" by Imogen Heap, "Wunderkind" by Alanis Morissette and "Winter Light" by Tim Finn. Evanescence lead singer Amy Lee also wrote a song for the film, but it was not included in the soundtrack.

The soundtrack was recorded at Abbey Road Studios, London, England, and in Los Angeles, California. Gregson-Williams employed the 75-piece Hollywood Studio Symphony Orchestra, along with a 140-member choir (mostly members of the Bach Choir) and numerous other solo musicians such as electric violinist Hugh Marsh and vocalist Lisbeth Scott (at his Wavecrest Studio). He composed the original score and then spent late September through early November 2005 conducting the Hollywood Orchestra and overseeing the recording of the English choir. For "colour", he employed instruments used in ancient folk music, and to underscore critical dramatic moments, he added choral textures and, occasionally, a solo voice. The score includes instances of electronic music.

The soundtrack received two Golden Globe Award nominations, Best Original Score and Best Original Song (for "Wunderkind").

EMI also released a compilation soundtrack entitled Music Inspired by The Chronicles of Narnia: The Lion, the Witch and the Wardrobe was released in September 2005. The album features songs by contemporary Christian music artists, such as Bethany Dillon, Kutless, and Nichole Nordeman. It released "Waiting for the World to Fall" by Jars of Clay as a single. The album went on to win the Special Event Album of the Year at the GMA Music Awards.

Another song inspired by the movie is "Lazy Sunday" (also known as "The Narnia rap") by the Lonely Island and Chris Parnell. The song and its music video was released as a comedy sketch in a 2005 episode of the TV show, Saturday Night Live. The song and its video are both a spoof of hardcore rap songs. In "Lazy Sunday", Parnell and Lonely Island member Andy Samberg rap about among other things, going to see The Chronicles of Narnia at an afternoon matinee. The joke is that the song's lyrics are not typical for hardcore rap, which normally depicts scenes of crime and violence. Samberg himself describes "Lazy Sunday" as "two guys rapping about very lame, sensitive stuff." Both the song and its video became an overnight hit, surprising its creators. "Lazy Sunday" is credited with helping revive Saturday Night Live which was stagnant in the years before the song's release. Several bootleg copies of "Lazy Sunday" were uploaded to the video-sharing YouTube, which had only launched earlier in the year, where they were very popular and gained a combined total of five million views (a very large number for an online video at the time). The video's popularity brought widespread attention to YouTube and kick started the site's success, quickly becoming the most popular video website on the internet and one of the most popular websites overall, remaining so as of the early 2020s.

== Release ==
On 7 December 2005, the film had its world premiere in London as the 59th Royal Film Performance, an event held in aid of The Film and Television Charity. The event took place at the Royal Albert Hall and was attended by the then Prince of Wales and Duchess of Cornwall. The film was released 8 December 2005 in the United Kingdom and 9 December 2005 in North America and the rest of Europe.

=== Box office ===
Worldwide, Narnia earned $745 million marking it the 55th-highest-grossing film of all time worldwide. It had a worldwide opening of $107.1 million, marking Disney's fifth-largest opening worldwide (at the time it was the largest). It is the third-largest movie worldwide among those released in 2005 and it remains the highest-grossing movie of the Narnia franchise worldwide, and separately in North America and overseas. Finally, it is also the most successful film of Walden Media worldwide.

==== United States and Canada ====
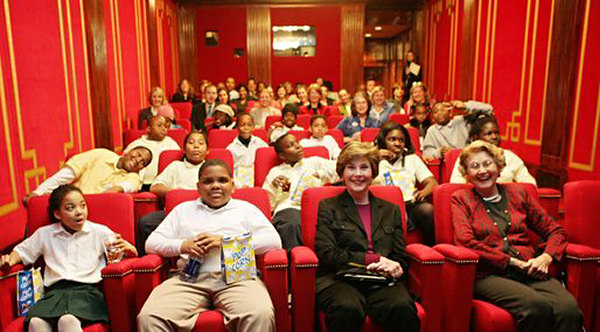
First Lady of the United States Laura Bush hosts a screening of the film at the White House Family Theater

The film opened with $23 million on around 6,800 screens at 3,616 theatres on its opening day (Friday, 9 December 2005), averaging $6,363 per theater or $3,383 per screen. The film took in a total of $65.6 million on its opening weekend (9–11 December 2005), the 24th-best opening weekend at the time (now 54th). It was also Disney's third-largest opening weekend at the time (now the 34th-largest) as well as the second-biggest December opening, behind The Lord of the Rings: The Return of the King. It is now fourth following the 2012 opening of The Hobbit: An Unexpected Journey, the 2007 release of I Am Legend, and the 2009 release of Avatar as well. Additionally, it made the third-largest opening weekend of 2005. It grossed $291.7 million in total becoming the second-highest-grossing film of 2005 behind Star Wars: Episode III – Revenge of the Sith. It surpassed the gross of Harry Potter and the Goblet of Fire by only $1.7 million, although the latter grossed $895.9 million worldwide, ahead of The Lion, the Witch and the Wardrobe. It is the highest-grossing film of the 2005 holiday period, the second-highest-grossing Christian film, the sixth-largest family–children's book adaptation, the ninth-highest-grossing fantasy–live-action film and the 10th-highest-grossing film overall in Disney company history. Finally, it is the largest film of Walden Media worldwide. Box Office Mojo estimates that the film sold over 45 million tickets in North America.

=== Critical reception ===
The Lion, The Witch and the Wardrobe received positive reviews. On Rotten Tomatoes, the film has an approval rating of 76% based on 216 reviews, with an average rating of 7.1/10. The site's critical consensus reads, "With first-rate special effects and compelling storytelling, this adaptation stays faithful to its source material and will please moviegoers of all ages." On Metacritic the film holds an average weighted score of 75 out of 100, based on 39 critics, indicating "generally favorable reviews". CinemaScore reported that audiences gave the film a rare "A+" grade.

Critic Roger Ebert gave the film 3 out of 4 stars. Ebert and Roeper gave the movie "Two Thumbs Up". Movie critic Leonard Maltin gave the film 3 out of four stars, calling it "an impressive and worthwhile family film", though he also said, "it does go on a bit and the special effects are extremely variable." Duane Dudak of the Milwaukee Journal Sentinel gave the movie 3 out of 4 stars. Stuart Klawans of The Nation said, "All ticket buyers will get their money's worth." Elizabeth Weitzman of New York Daily News gave it 4 out of 4 stars and said: "A generation-spanning journey that feels both comfortingly familiar and excitingly original." Critic Mick LaSalle of the San Francisco Chronicle listed it as the second best film of the year. Kit Bowen gave the film 3 out of 4 stars.

John Anderson of Newsday reacted negatively to the film, stating "there's a deliberateness, a fastidiousness and a lack of daring and vision that marks the entire operation."

== Accolades ==
The Lion, the Witch and the Wardrobe won several awards including the Academy Award for Best Makeup; the BeliefNet Film Award for Best Spiritual film; the Movieguide Faith & Values Awards: Most Inspiring Movie of 2005 and Best Family Movie of 2005; and the CAMIE (Character and Morality In Entertainment) Award. Others include the British Academy Film Awards for Makeup and Hair, and Orange Rising Star (James McAvoy); Outstanding Motion Picture, Animated or Mixed Media; the Phoenix Film Critics Society Award for Best Performance by a Youth in a Lead or Supporting Role (Georgie Henley, Female); the Costume Designers Guild Award for Excellence in Fantasy Film (Isis Mussenden); and the Saturn Award for Costumes (Isis Mussenden) and Make-up (Howard Berger, Greg Nicotero, and Nikki Gooley).

Georgie Henley received critical acclaim for her performance as Lucy Pevensie. She won several awards, including the Phoenix Film Critics Society award for Best Actress in a Leading Role and Best Performance by a Youth. She also won other awards either for Best Young Performance or Best Actress in a Leading Role.

Year	Award	Category	Recipient	Result	Ref.
2005	Phoenix Film Critics Society Awards	Best Performance by a Youth in a Lead or Supporting Role – Female	Georgie Henley	Won	
2005	Satellite Awards	Outstanding Motion Picture, Animated or Mixed Media		Won	
2006	Satellite Awards	Best DVD Extras		Nominated	
2006	78th Academy Awards	Best Makeup	Howard Berger and Tami Lane	Won	
2006	78th Academy Awards	Best Sound Mixing	Terry Porter, Dean A. Zupancic and Tony Johnson	Nominated	
2006	78th Academy Awards	Best Visual Effects	Dean Wright, Bill Westenhofer, Jim Berney and Scott Farrar	Nominated	
2006	Annie Awards	Best Character Animation	Matt Shumway	Nominated	
2006	Australian Film Institute	Excellence in Filmmaking	Roger Ford (Production design)	Nominated	
2006	Australian Film Institute	Excellence in Filmmaking	Donald McAlpine (Cinematography)	Nominated	
2006	59th BAFTA Awards	Best Makeup and Hair	Howard Berger, Greg Nicotero and Nikki Gooley	Won	
2006	59th BAFTA Awards	Best Achievement in Special Visual Effects	Dean Wright, Bill Westenhofer, Jim Berney and Scott Farrar	Nominated	
2006	59th BAFTA Awards	Best Costume Design	Isis Mussenden	Nominated	
2006	Broadcast Film Critics Association Awards	Best Family Film (Live Action)		Won	
2006	Broadcast Film Critics Association Awards	Best Young Actress	Georgie Henley	Nominated	
2006	CAMIE Awards		Charlie Nelson (Walt Disney Pictures); Brigham Taylor (Disney vice-president productions); Mark Johnson (producer); Philip Steuer (producer); Douglas Gresham (co-producer); Andrew Adamson (director); Ann Peacock (screenwriter); Christopher Markus (screenwriter); Stephen McFeely (screenwriter); Georgie Henley (actor); William Moseley (actor); Skandar Keynes (actor); Anna Popplewell (actor) (Walden Media)	Won	
2006	CFCA Awards	Most Promising Performer	Georgie Henley	Nominated	
2006	Costume Designers Guild Awards	Fantasy Film	Isis Mussenden	Won	
2006	11th Empire Awards	Best Newcomer	Georgie Henley	Nominated	
2006	11th Empire Awards	Best Newcomer	James McAvoy	Nominated	
2006	11th Empire Awards	Best Sci-Fi / Fantasy		Nominated	
2006	63rd Golden Globe Awards	Best Original Score	Harry Gregson-Williams	Nominated	
2006	63rd Golden Globe Awards	Best Original Song	Alanis Morissette, for "Wunderkind"	Nominated	
2006	Hugo Awards	Hugo Award for Best Dramatic Presentation		Nominated	
2006	Humanitas Prize	Feature Film Category	Ann Peacock, Andrew Adamson, Christopher Markus and Stephen McFeely	Nominated	
2006	London Film Critics Circle Awards 2005	British Supporting Actor of the Year	James McAvoy	Nominated	
2006	London Film Critics Circle Awards 2005	British Supporting Actress of the Year	Tilda Swinton	Nominated	
2006	MTV Movie Awards	MTV Movie Award for Best Villain	Tilda Swinton	Nominated	
2006	Motion Picture Sound Editors	Best Sound Editing in Feature Film – Dialogue and Automated Dialogue Replacement	George Watters II (supervising sound editor); Kimberly Harris (supervising adr editor); Richard Beggs (sound designer); David Bach (supervising dialogue editor); David V. Butler (dialogue editor); Laura Graham (adr editor); Michele Perrone (adr editor)	Nominated	
2006	Motion Picture Sound Editors	Best Sound Editing in Feature Film – Sound Effects & Foley	Richard Beggs (supervising sound editor); George Watters II (supervising sound editor); Victoria Martin (supervising foley editor); F. Hudson Miller (sound editor); R.J. Palmer (sound editor); John Morris (sound editor); Suhail Kafity (sound editor); Chuck Michael (sound editor); Todd Toon (sound editor); Gary Wright (sound editor); Heather Gross (sound editor); Matthew Harrison (foley editor); James Likowski (foley editor); Dan O'Connell (foley artist); John T. Cucci (foley artist)	Nominated	
2006	Movieguide Awards	Best Film for Families		Won	
2006	Movieguide Awards	Epiphany Prize		Won	
2006	Online Film Critics Society Awards	Best Breakthrough Performance	Georgie Henley	Nominated	
2006	Saturn Awards	Best Fantasy Film		Nominated	
2006	Saturn Awards	Best Director	Andrew Adamson	Nominated	
2006	Saturn Awards	Best Writing	Andrew Adamson, Ann Peacock, Christopher Markus and Stephen McFeely	Nominated	
2006	Saturn Awards	Best Actress	Tilda Swinton	Nominated	
2006	Saturn Awards	Best Young Actor/Actress	William Moseley	Nominated	
2006	Saturn Awards	Best Costume Design	Isis Mussenden	Won	
2006	Saturn Awards	Best Make-up	Howard Berger, Nikki Gooley and Greg Nicotero	Won	
2006	Saturn Awards	Best Visual Effects	Dean Wright, Bill Westenhofer, Jim Berney, Scott Farrar	Nominated	
2006	Visual Effects Society	Outstanding Animated Character in a Live Action Motion Picture	Richard Baneham, Erik-Jan de Boer, Matt Logue, Joe Ksander; For "Aslan"	Nominated	
2006	Visual Effects Society	Outstanding Visual Effects in a Visual Effects Driven Motion Picture	Dean Wright, Randy Starr, Bill Westenhofer and Jim Berney	Nominated	
2006	World Soundtrack Awards	Best Original Song Written Directly for a Film	Harry Gregson-Williams (music), Imogen Heap (music/lyrics/performer); For the song "Can't Take It In"	Nominated	
2006	27th Young Artist Awards	Best Family Feature Film – Drama		Won	
2006	27th Young Artist Awards	Best Performance in a Feature Film – Young Actress Age Ten or Younger	Georgie Henley	Won	
2006	27th Young Artist Awards	Best Performance in a Feature Film (Comedy or Drama) – Leading Young Actor	William Moseley	Nominated	
2007	Academy of Science Fiction, Fantasy & Horror Films, USA	Best DVD Special Edition Release; For the "Extended Edition"		Nominated	
2007	49th Grammy Awards	Grammy Award for Best Score Soundtrack Album for a Motion Picture, Television or Other Visual Media	Harry Gregson-Williams	Nominated	
2007	49th Grammy Awards	Grammy Award for Best Song Written for a Motion Picture, Television or Other Visual Media	Imogen Heap; For the song "Can't Take It In"	Nominated	

=== Home media ===
The DVD for The Chronicles of Narnia: The Lion, the Witch and the Wardrobe was released on 4 April 2006. It is available in a standard one-disc set (with separate full-screen and widescreen editions), and a deluxe widescreen two-disc boxed set with additional artwork and other materials from Disney and Walden Media. The DVD sold four million copies on its first day of release and overtook Harry Potter and the Goblet of Fire to become the top-selling DVD in North America for 2006. As of December 2008, it has grossed $353.5 million in DVD sales, equivalent to 12,458,637 units sold.

Disney later issued a four-disc extended cut of the film on DVD. It was released on 12 December 2006, and was available commercially until 31 January 2007, after which Disney put the DVD on moratorium. The extended cut of the film runs approximately 150 minutes. The set includes all of the features previously released on the two-disc special edition. The two additional discs include a segment called "The Dreamer of Narnia", a previously unreleased feature-length film about C. S. Lewis, and additional production featurettes. Most of the extended footage, besides the extended battle sequence, is longer establishing shots of Narnia and footage of the Pevensies walking in Narnia.

The high-definition Blu-ray Disc version was released on 13 May 2008, in the United States, and on 16 June 2008, in the United Kingdom. The film will be released on 4K Ultra HD Blu-ray on 15 December 2026.

== See also ==
- List of Christmas films
- List of films about witchcraft
