= Soumaya Keynes =

British journalist and economist (born 1989)

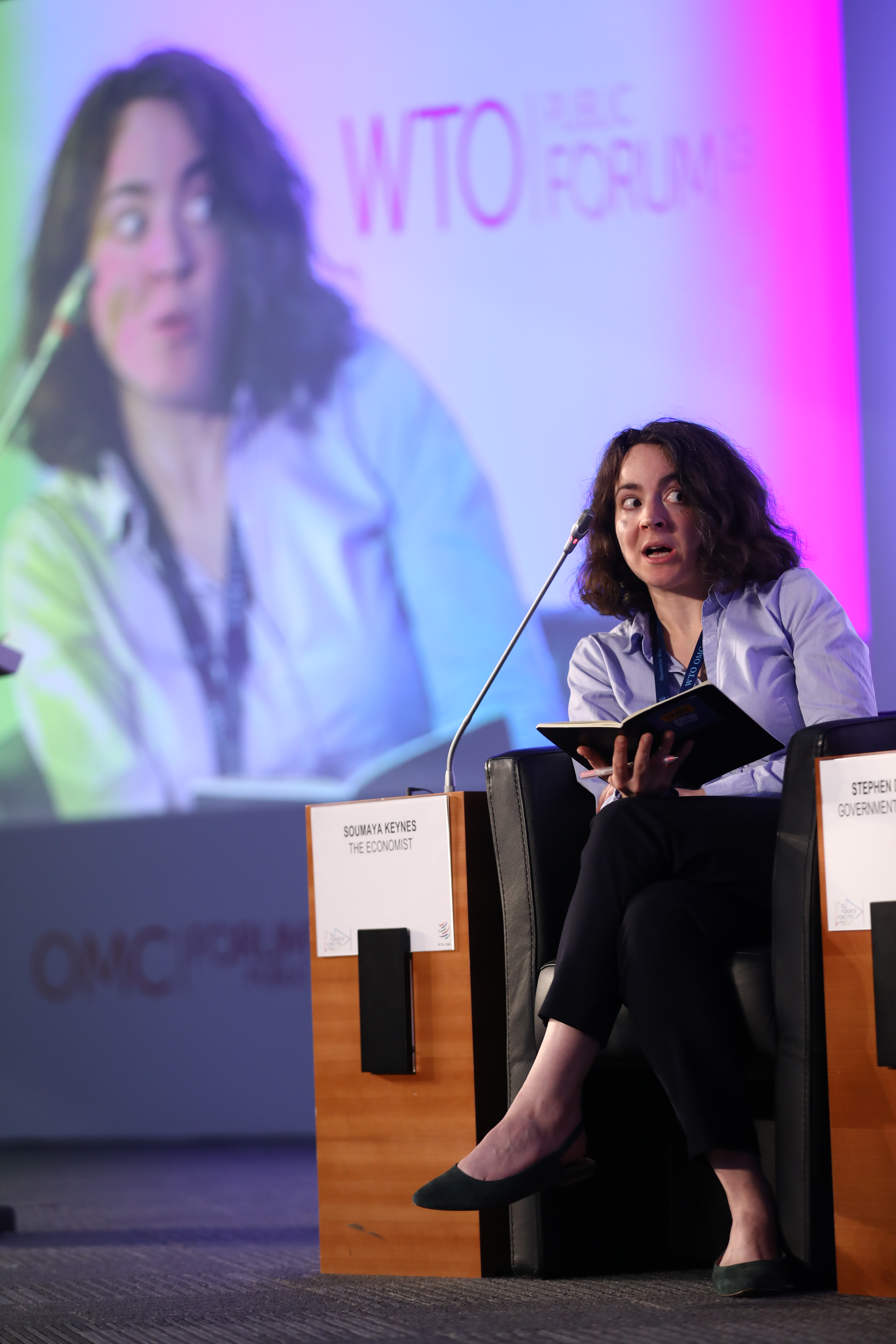
- Keynes at the WTO Public Forum 2019 Day
- Born: 1 August 1989 (age 37)
- Education: University of Cambridge (BA, MPhil)
- Occupations: Journalist, podcast host
- Spouse: Patrick Allies (m. 2018)
- Children: 2
- Father: Randal Keynes
- Relatives: Skandar Keynes (brother); Charles Darwin (great-great-great-grandfather)
- Family: Keynes family Darwin–Wedgwood family
- Website: soumayakeynes.com

Soumaya Anne Keynes (born 31 July 1989) is a British economist and journalist and current columnist at the Financial Times.

In addition to her work as a columnist for the FT, she started hosting a new podcast for them in May 2024, on economic matters.

Before joining the Financial Times, she worked for eight years as the Britain economics editor at The Economist magazine. She co-hosted The Economist's Money Talks podcast, and co-founded and co-hosted Trade Talks, a podcast covering economic trade, from 2017-2021. Her work at The Economist was focused on the US economy and the trade policies of Donald Trump's first presidency. Her career in economic research began as a policy adviser for Her Majesty's Treasury in London, looking at banking and credit. Afterward, she worked at the Institute for Fiscal Studies, focusing on pensions and public finances.

== Early life and family ==
Soumaya Keynes was born in Britain on 31 July 1989, to a Lebanese mother (Zelfa Hourani) and English conservationist Randal Keynes. Her younger brother, Skandar Keynes (born September 5, 1991), is a political adviser and former actor. Soumaya Keynes also worked as a child actress.

On her maternal side, her grandfather was Lebanese author Cecil Hourani, an advisor to the late Tunisian president Habib Bourguiba. The Hourani family were immigrants to Manchester from Marjeyoun in southern Lebanon. Cecil's two brothers were Albert Hourani, a prominent historian of the Middle East, and George Hourani, philosopher, historian, and classicist.

On her paternal side, she is the great-great-niece of John Maynard Keynes, a British economist who had a large impact on macroeconomic theory and policy. Keynes herself says it is partially because of this relationship that she initially avoided macro-economics in her studies, focusing instead on microeconomics. She is also the great-great-great-granddaughter of British naturalist Charles Darwin through her great-grandmother Margaret Elizabeth Darwin.

== Education ==
Keynes attended Trinity College, Cambridge for both her undergraduate and master's degrees. She completed a Bachelor of Arts in Economics in 2010 (1st Class) and a MPhil Economics in 2011. She completed her MPhil with distinction. It was during her time at the University of Cambridge that she learned of, and decided to join, the Institute for Fiscal Studies.

== Career ==
=== Institute for Fiscal Studies ===
Keynes joined the Institute for Fiscal Studies in 2012. During her work at the institute for Fiscal Studies she frequently published research with Carl Emmerson, Rowena Crawford, and Gemma Tetlow. Her work with the Institute covered economic reforms to the UK's state pension, the UK Government's fiscal policies, economic analyses of health variations in the UK and US, and a variety of other topics. Throughout her research papers she aimed to tell a story, moving from previous literature into how her work will either change what was previously thought, or expand upon what was previously thought. Her final report with the Institute for Fiscal Studies was published on May 22, 2015.

=== The Economist ===
Keynes joined The Economist in June 2015. She began by writing the Free Exchange column, which provides a literature review of recent papers in economics. Her first article with the column, Public Debt - How Much is Too Much, was published June 3, 2015. She was promoted to US economics and trade editor in June 2018, and in 2019 became the trade and globalization editor at The Economist.

Keynes worked on multiple projects during her time with The Economist. Her early work had a wide scope and covered a variety of topics, such as the Big Mac Index. Her latest work has mostly focused on the United States Trade War under the Trump Administration. Recently she has covered the impacts of trade disputes such as the need for firms to reduce investments, its effect on consumers, the risks to the World Trade Organization, and the changes to America's relationship with countries around the world.

Keynes has been on The Economist radio podcast Money Talks multiple times. Much of her work on the podcast is in the same areas as her writing, focused on trade and the Donald Trump presidency. She has also done episodes in a similar vein to her previous work with the Institute for Fiscal Studies, examining the impact of economic research on public policy.

During her work with The Economist she has expressed multiple personal opinions on the material she covers. She has repeatedly stated that she feels Trump is damaging the economy through acting in an unpredictable manner. Keynes supports a rules based system for international trade, through bodies like the World Trade Organization, to resolve any discrepancies and disputes between countries.

Keynes' work, during her time with The Economist, is not restricted to solely their events and publications. She has written for a variety of newspapers and magazines, such as Prospect magazine. She has hosted and chaired events, such as the 2019 World Trade Symposium in New York, and participated as a panel member for a variety of panels. She is a Poynter fellow at Yale University, where she has talked on Trump's trade policy. Additionally, she's given multiple interviews both about her work and her transition from research to journalism.

=== Trade Talks Podcast ===
Keynes co-hosts the podcast Trade Talks with Chad Bown, an economist at The Peterson Institute for International Economics. The podcast began in 2017 and covers the intricacies of international trade policy from the perspective of two economists. They have covered topics such as the Trump Administration's legal battles with the World Trade Organization, the North American Free Trade Agreement, and the impact of tariffs on washing machines.

The podcast frequently features notable guests from the World Bank, World Trade Organization, and various universities, newspapers, and research bodies. Examples include Caroline Freund of the World Bank and Peter Van den Bossche of the World Trade Institute at the University of Bern.

== Select scholarship and works ==
=== Single-Tier Pension: What Does it Really Mean? ===
Working alongside Rowena Crawford and Gemma Tetlow, Keynes investigated the impact of the newest reforms to the UK pension system in 2013. The big change was a shift from the multi-tier pension system to the single-tier pension system, creating a simpler flat-rate. The pension would pay only one amount, £144, per week, meaning that high income earners, who contribute more, would get the same pension as low income earners. The paper analyzed both the short and long-run impacts of this change as well as the winners and losers of the change.

By comparing people's income under the previous system to their income under the new system, the paper found that in the short run there would be some winners. Women reaching pension age in the first four years of the new system being implemented would receive greater benefit. This advantage is greater for those who took time out of the workforce to care for children or disabled adults. The biggest winners of the new pension system would be those who spent an extended amount of time away from the workforce, those who did low paying work, and those who were self-employed for an extended period. Low income earners in the bottom quintile would see an average rise in weekly pension income of £3.97.

While there would be short-term winners, the changes ultimately lead those soon reaching retirement age to have mixed results, with 35% of men receiving gains and 61% of women. These findings differed dramatically from the numbers published by the Department for Work and Pensions in 2015, which stated that 70% of men and 75% of women would benefit from the single-tier pension. The paper found, significantly, that only 17% of those closest to retirement would actually receive a pension in the single tier entitlement. Some 23% of earners would receive pensions worth more than the single tier amount while 61% would receive pensions less than the single-tier amount. Keynes stated that despite the system not being entirely a single payout it would allow for greater ease in predicting future pension payments.

The report also found that in the long run there would be significantly more losers than winners. Those previously claiming the second state pension would receive less. The largest losers, however, would be young people and high income earners. A high-income earner working for 35 years would lose up to £2,300 in pension under the new system, compared to the old system. A low-income earner planning to work for a further 35 years would experience losses of £1,000.

Another finding was that the system, while incurring losses for future pensioners in the United Kingdom, did have reason to cut back. The ageing population will lead to increased spending on pensions over the next 50 years, with public pension expenses rising as a percentage of national income from 5.4% in 2012 to 9.1% in 2062 if the current two-tiered system were maintained. Switching to the one-tier system would reduce the long-run spending to 8.4% of national income in 2062.

=== Post-election Austerity: Parties' Plans Compared ===
Much of Keynes' work at the Institute for Fiscal Studies revolved around current political affairs. She published research alongside fellow Institute for Fiscal Studies researchers Rowena Crawford, Carl Emmerson, and Gemma Tetlow in the lead up to the 2015 United Kingdom General Election. The research examined the fiscal spending and borrowing plans of each of the United Kingdom's major political parties. They projected, for the course of the next government's term, what net borrowing and net spending of public funds would be. Overall the researchers faced difficulties in trying to determine the true intentions of the parties, as not all were forthcoming with their full spending and borrowing plans. Ultimately the researchers had to estimate multiple pieces of parties' plans in order to determine the real numbers that would be used by the next government.

David Cameron's conservative party had not stated what level of public borrowing they were aiming to achieve, but they had outlined specific plans for public spending. The researchers were able to determine that if a Conservative government was elected the public spending would fall by 5.2% of national income between 2014 and 2019. A surplus of 0.2% of national income would arise in the final year, 2019. They, also, determined that the conservative plan would result in slightly less than a £4 billion tax cut in the UK, when they factor in anti-avoidance measures a net tax increase of £1 billion would occur. Furthermore, they found the Conservatives would rapidly raise the retirement age after getting elected.

Ed Miliband's Labour Party had, like the conservative party, released limited information on how much public borrowing they intended to carry out as government. This meant the researchers were forced to make a few key assumptions. They assumed labour would maintain the current government spending plan in place until 2016, and then they would freeze the government's unprotected departments and balance the budget by 2019. Based on Labour's plan and these assumptions they determined a Labour government would have borrowing fall by 3.6% from 2015 to 2019, ultimately reaching 1.4% of national income in 2019. They determined debt would rise in 2016–2017 and labour would have a £6 billion tax rise, that increases to £12 billion when anti-avoidance measures are factored in.

Their research also covered the policies of the Scottish National Party (SNP) and Liberal-Democrats. They found the Liberal-Democrats to be the most transparent party and determined their plan would lead to net borrowing dropping by 3.9% of national income until 2018, at which point it would reach 1.1% of national income. When factoring in anti-avoidance measures they would have a £12 billion tax rise. The SNP would have borrowing drop by 3.9% until 2020, ultimately reaching 1.4% of national income that year. The SNP's plan would be revenue neutral on its taxation, and has factored in anti-avoidance measures.

When the conservative party won the 2015 general election this research proved valuable for others who sought to examine the impacts of their plans over the course of the coming years. Allowed for research after the election to focus on the personal allowance for income tax, the UK's retirement age, and the effect of reduced spending on public services.

=== Women and Economics - Inefficient Equilibrium ===
Keynes has, throughout her years as an economist and especially throughout her time at The Economist, focused on women in economics, and why there are so few of them. She has done multiple podcasts on the topic, including a three-part special for the BBC, she has given a TED Talk and a talk at Yale University about the issue, and, most notably, wrote a special in the 2017 Economist's Christmas Specials publication titled Women in Economics - Inefficient Equilibrium. The piece focuses on the disparity between men and women in the field of research economics and why this matters for the profession. The article was influential in encouraging other economists to examine the issue.

Keynes highlights that only 20% of European, and 15% of American, senior economists are female. This trend is unique to economics, most other disciplines in the social sciences are closer to gender parity. The issue begins with fewer women going into economics at the undergraduate level, and women being more skeptical of economics when they do enter the field. There are 2.9 men for every woman in undergraduate economics programs worldwide. Furthermore, women are much more likely to drop out than their male counterparts along the path to a tenure track position. A male student that earns a B in their first undergraduate class is much less likely to drop out than a female student.

The issue continues when women are working to achieve tenure positions at universities. Women are promoted to tenure at a much lower rate than men, 29% compared to 56%. This occurs for a variety of reasons. Women need to publish more papers than their male counterparts to have the same chance at tenure promotions. Women are published less often than men, it's argued this is in part due to women going into fields of economics that would be less familiar to the editors of major papers (who are usually men) and therefore less likely to be published. Furthermore, when women are published they face a higher bar than men. Co-authoring a paper leads to an 8% increase in a man's likelihood of promotion, whereas only a 2% increase for a woman. This is partially because the names of authors on economics papers appear in alphabetical order, rather than in order of workload. Another barrier to tenure for women in economics is student evaluations. Student evaluations have been shown to discriminate against women, leading to greater difficulty in achieving tenure.

Keynes argues that this is an issue as men and women approach economics differently, so losing one half means that economics cannot operate as well as it should. She highlights that women are more open to programs involving income redistribution than men, meaning that only having men as economists means there is not a representative sample. She argues that the gap between male and female economists, which is currently growing, must shrink in order to solve this issue. Keynes states this won't be easy, economics has an image problem, seen as a mostly male field. Furthermore, women won't feel they belong until more women are in economic faculty positions, but this can't happen until more women join economics; both must precede the other.

After Keynes published her work in 2017, further research published in 2019 backed up what she had reported.

== Personal life ==
Keynes married in 2018, and also used to sing as a soprano with the 18th Street Singers. In January 2023 she announced on Twitter that she and husband London-based conductor and musicologist Patrick Allies had welcomed their first child, a son.

In January 2025, Keynes announced via Bluesky that she and husband had welcomed their second child, a daughter.
