= Rory Naismith =

Historian

Rory Naismith FRHistS
- Born: Edinburgh, Scotland

Academic background
- Education: Trinity College, Cambridge
- Thesis: History and Coinage in Southumbrian England, c. 750-865 (2009)
- Doctoral advisor: Simon Keynes and Mark Blackburn

Academic work
- Discipline: Medieval history
- Sub-discipline: Numismatics; Anglo-Saxon England; Economic history
- Institutions: Clare College, Cambridge; King's College London; Corpus Christi College, Cambridge; Department of Anglo-Saxon, Norse and Celtic, University of Cambridge
- Notable works: Making Money in the Early Middle Ages

Rory Naismith is a British academic, medieval numismatist and historian of Anglo-Saxon England, specialising in economic and monetary history. He is Professor of Early Medieval English History and Fellow of Corpus Christi College, Cambridge.

As an undergraduate and postgraduate Naismith studied in the department of Anglo-Saxon, Norse and Celtic at Trinity College, Cambridge between 2002 and 2009, and between 2009 and 2015 pursued postdoctoral research at the Fitzwilliam Museum and was based at Clare College, Cambridge. He subsequently lectured for four years at King's College London before returning to the University of Cambridge.

== Selected publications ==
- The Coinage of Southern England 796–865, British Numismatic Society Special Publication 8, 2 vols. (London: Spink, 2011)
- Money and Power in Anglo-Saxon England: the Southern English Kingdoms 757–865, Cambridge Studies in Medieval Life and Thought, 4th series, 80 (Cambridge: Cambridge University Press, 2012)
- Sylloge of Coins of the British Isles, vol. 67. British Museum: Anglo-Saxon Coins II: Southern English Coinage from Offa to Alfred, c. 760–c. 880 (London: British Museum Press, 2016)
- (with F. Tinti) The Forum Hoard of Anglo-Saxon Coins/Il ripostiglio dell’Atrium Vestae nel Foro Romano, Bollettino di numismatica 55–6 (Rome: Istituto Poligrafico e Zecca dello Stato, 2016)
- Citadel of the Saxons: the Rise of Early London (London: I.B. Tauris, 2018)
- Medieval European Coinage, with a Catalogue of the Coins in the Fitzwilliam Museum, Cambridge. 8: Britain and Ireland c. 400–1066 (Cambridge: Cambridge University Press, 2017)
- Early Medieval Britain, c. 500–1000 (Cambridge: Cambridge University Press, 2021)
- Making Money in the Early Middle Ages (Princeton NJ: Princeton University Press, 2023)
- Offa: King of the Mercians (New Haven CT: Yale University Press, 2026)

Naismith's book on Money and Power in Anglo-Saxon England: The Southern English Kingdoms 757–865 (Cambridge University Press, 2012) won the 2013 International Society of Anglo-Saxonists First Book Prize. His book Making Money in the Early Middle Ages won the 2025 Otto Gründler Book Prize.
