= Roger Keynes =

British medical scientist (born 1951)

Roger John Keynes (/ˈkeɪnz/; born 25 February 1951) is a British medical scientist. He is a Fellow of Trinity College, Cambridge, and a professor within the Department of Physiology, Development and Neuroscience. He was elected a Fellow of the Academy of Medical Sciences in 2005.

Keynes is the third of four sons. His father was Richard Keynes, through whom he is a great-great-grandson of Charles Darwin. His mother Ann Pinsent Adrian was the daughter of Edgar Adrian, 1st Baron Adrian and his wife Hester (née Pinsent). His elder brother, Randal Keynes, was a conservationist and author, while his younger brother, Simon Keynes, is a historian and a Fellow of Trinity, as was their father, Richard. Roger Keynes is married to Yasmina Keynes.
