= Historical reconstruction =

Recreation of past lives, events, and objects

Historical reconstruction is the recreation of past lives, events, and objects of a particular moment in time in the past. As an academic discipline, historical reconstruction is a practice of creating a coherent narrative about the past by analyzing historical data from diverse sources. The whole study of history may be viewed as "an exercise in interpretative historical reconstruction". Historical reconstruction may be used as an educational tool in schools.

Examples of historical reconstruction include experimental archaeology, historical reenactment and living museums (skansens, ethnographic villages).

== See also ==
- Forensic history
- Historic preservation
- In-vivo reconstruction, art genre attempting to depict prehistoric life according to scientific evidence
- Linguistic reconstruction of ancestor languages
- Memorial reconstruction, a hypothesis that some old plays were written down from memories of actors
- National Film Award for Best Historical Reconstruction/Compilation Film
