= John Pinsent =

English classical scholar (1922–1995)

John Pinsent (2 November 1922 – 3 February 1995 in Liverpool, England) was an English classical scholar, especially in the area of Greek mythology. He founded and edited an academic journal on classical antiquity, the Liverpool Classical Monthly. It was established in 1976 and continued until 1995. Pinsent was its editor-in-chief for its complete lifespan and, because of this, it was sometimes known as Pinsent's Paper.

Pinsent was educated at St Edmund's School, Canterbury, followed by Oriel College, Oxford. His university studies were interrupted during World War II to serve in the Royal Air Force. He flew Catalina flying boats based at Loch Erne in Northern Ireland.

From 1950–1953, Pinsent was an assistant lecturer in Greek at Liverpool University, followed by becoming lecturer (1953–1969), senior lecturer (1969–1978), and reader (1978–1980). Between 1983–1987, he was Public Orator of the university. He authored several books on classical Greek subjects, including Greek Mythology, first published in 1969. Pinsent's published books include:

- Greek Mythology (1969). ISBN 978-0872262508.
- Myths & Legends of Ancient Greece (1969). ISBN 978-0600001287.
- Myths and Legends of Ancient Greece (1973). ISBN 978-0448008486.
- Military Tribunes and Plebeian Consuls, the Fasti from 444 V to 342 V (1975). ISBN 978-3515018999.
- Dieux et Déesses de l'Olympe (1986). ISBN 978-2221504314.

Pinsent was married three times, the third time to the former sister-in-law of the actor John Hurt. His surviving son is the cartoonist Ed Pinsent, and is from John's second marriage, as is his daughter.
