= Edgar Adrian =

English electrophysiologist (1889–1977)

The Right Honourable The Lord Adrian OM FRS
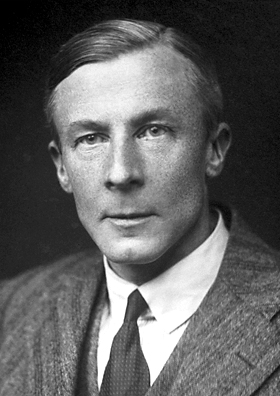
- Adrian in 1932

49th President of the Royal Society
- In office 1950–1955
- Preceded by: Sir Robert Robinson
- Succeeded by: Sir Cyril Norman Hinshelwood

Master of Trinity College, Cambridge
- In office 1955–1965
- Preceded by: G. M. Trevelyan
- Succeeded by: Rab Butler

Personal details
- Born: 30 November 1889 Hampstead, London, England
- Died: 4 August 1977 (aged 87) Cambridge, England
- Spouse: Hester Adrian (m. 1923)
- Children: Anne Keynes; Richard Adrian (1927–1995); Jennet Campbell (b. 1927)
- Scientific career
- Education: Trinity College, Cambridge; St Bartholomew's Hospital Medical College
- Awards: Fellow of the Royal Society; Nobel Prize in Physiology or Medicine (1932); Royal Medal (1934); Copley Medal (1946); Albert Medal (1953); Karl Spencer Lashley Award (1961)
- Fields: Biology (electrophysiology)
- Workplaces: University of Cambridge

Edgar Douglas Adrian, 1st Baron Adrian (30 November 1889 – 4 August 1977) was an English electrophysiologist and recipient of the 1932 Nobel Prize for Physiology, won jointly with Sir Charles Sherrington for work on the function of neurons. He provided experimental evidence for the all-or-none law of nerves.

== Biography ==
Adrian was born in Hampstead, London, the youngest son of Alfred Douglas Adrian, legal adviser to the Local Government Board, and Flora Lavinia Barton.

He was educated at Westminster School and studied Natural Sciences at Trinity College, Cambridge, graduating in 1911. In 1913 he was elected to a fellowship of Trinity College on account of his research into the "all or none" law of nerves.

After completing a medical degree (MB BCh) in 1915, he undertook clinical work at St Bartholomew's Hospital London during World War I, treating soldiers with nerve damage and nervous disorders such as shell shock. Adrian returned to Cambridge as a lecturer gaining his doctorate (MD) in 1919 and in 1925 began research on the human sensory organs by electrical methods.

=== Career ===
Continuing earlier studies of Keith Lucas, he used a capillary electrometer and cathode-ray tube to amplify the signals produced by the nervous system and was able to record the electrical discharge of single nerve fibres under physical stimulus. (It seems he used frogs in his experiments) An accidental discovery by Adrian in 1928 proved the presence of electricity within nerve cells. Adrian said,

I had arranged electrodes on the optic nerve of a toad in connection with some experiments on the retina. The room was nearly dark and I was puzzled to hear repeated noises in the loudspeaker attached to the amplifier, noises indicating that a great deal of impulse activity was going on. It was not until I compared the noises with my own movements around the room that I realised I was in the field of vision of the toad's eye and that it was signalling what I was doing.

A key result, published in 1928, stated that the excitation of the skin under constant stimulus is initially strong but gradually decreases over time, whereas the sensory impulses passing along the nerves from the point of contact are constant in strength, yet are reduced in frequency over time, and the sensation in the brain diminishes as a result.

Extending these results to the study of pain causes by the stimulus of the nervous system, he made discoveries about the reception of such signals in the brain and spatial distribution of the sensory areas of the cerebral cortex in different animals. These conclusions lead to the idea of a sensory map, called the homunculus, in the somatosensory system.

Later, Adrian used the electroencephalogram to study the electrical activity of the brain in humans. His work on the abnormalities of the Berger rhythm paved the way for subsequent investigation in epilepsy and other cerebral pathologies. He spent the last portion of his research career investigating olfaction.

Positions that he held during his career included Foulerton Professor 1929–1937; Professor of Physiology in the University of Cambridge 1937–1951; President of the Royal Society 1950–1955; Master of Trinity College, Cambridge, 1951–1965; president of the Royal Society of Medicine 1960–1962; Chancellor of the University of Cambridge 1967–1975; Chancellor of the University of Leicester 1957–1971. Adrian was elected a Foreign Honorary Member of the American Academy of Arts and Sciences and the American Philosophical Society in 1938. He was elected an International Member of the United States National Academy of Sciences in 1941. In 1946 he became foreign member of the Royal Netherlands Academy of Arts and Sciences. In 1942 he was awarded the Order of Merit and in the 1955 New Year Honours was created Baron Adrian of Cambridge in the County of Cambridge.

== Family ==
On 14 June 1923 Edgar Adrian married Hester Agnes Pinsent, who was the daughter of Ellen Pinsent and sister of David Pinsent. Together they had three children, first a daughter and then twins:

- Anne Pinsent Adrian, who married the physiologist Richard Keynes, who was the great-grandson of Charles Darwin. The couple had four children.
  - Adrian Keynes (1946–1974)
  - Randal Keynes (*1948)
  - Roger Keynes (*1951)
  - Simon Keynes (*1952)
- Richard Adrian, 2nd Baron Adrian (1927–1995)
  - The couple had no children.
- Jennet Adrian (born 1927), who married Peter Watson Campbell
  - Further family details unknown.

== Bibliography ==
- The Basis of Sensation (1928)
- The Mechanism of Nervous Action (1932)
- Factors Determining Human Behavior (1937)

== Arms ==
Coat of arms of Edgar Adrian
Crest The astronomical sign of Mercury Or between two roses Gules barbed and seeded Proper. Escutcheon Vert three estoiles Argent on a chief Argent a lion passant Sable. Supporters On either side a lion Sable semee of pentacles Or. Motto Non Tempere Credere

== See also ==
- List of presidents of the Royal Society

Academic offices
Preceded by George Macaulay Trevelyan	31st Master of Trinity College, Cambridge; 1951–1965	Succeeded by The Lord Butler of Saffron Walden
New office	1st Chancellor of the University of Leicester; 1957–1971	Succeeded by Alan Lloyd Hodgkin
Preceded by The Lord Tedder	Chancellor of the University of Cambridge; 1967–1976	Succeeded by The Duke of Edinburgh
Professional and academic associations
Preceded by Robert Robinson	49th President of the Royal Society; 1950–1955	Succeeded by Cyril Norman Hinshelwood
Peerage of the United Kingdom
New creation	Baron Adrian; 1955–1977	Succeeded by Richard Adrian
