= Zack Pinsent =

British tailor and costumer

Zack MacLeod Pinsent (born c. 1994) is a British tailor and costumer who dresses in historical clothing.

== Biography ==
Pinsent is a native of Hove, East Sussex, England. According to him, he started wearing historical clothes when he was 14 years old, after finding a box of his great-grandfather's old suits.

He has collaborated with Colonial Williamsburg; Zack is also the owner of Pinsent Tailoring, usually commissioned by individuals and historical museums interested in historical fashion.

During the COVID-19 pandemic, Pinsent started designing and selling history-themed face masks.
