= Simon Keynes =

English academic (born 1952)

Simon Keynes FBA FSA FRHistS
- Born: 23 September 1952 (age 74); Cambridge, England
- Occupations: Academic, historian, antiquarian

Academic background
- Education: King's College School, Cambridge; The Leys School
- Alma mater: Trinity College, Cambridge (BA, PhD, LittD)
- Doctoral advisor: Dorothy Whitelock

Academic work
- Discipline: Anglo-Saxon studies
- Sub-discipline: Anglo-Saxon history; Anglo-Norman; reception history
- Institutions: University of Cambridge
- Notable students: Rory Naismith

Simon Douglas Keynes (/ˈkeɪnz/ KAYNZ; born 23 September 1952) is a British historian who is Elrington and Bosworth Professor of Anglo-Saxon emeritus in the Department of Anglo-Saxon, Norse, and Celtic at the University of Cambridge, and a fellow of Trinity College.

== Biography ==
Keynes is the fourth and youngest son of Richard Darwin Keynes and his wife Anne Adrian, and thus a member of the Keynes family (and, by extension, of the Darwin–Wedgwood family). Two of his elder brothers are the conservationist and author Randal Keynes and the medical scientist and fellow fellow of Trinity Roger Keynes. He is the grandson of the surgeon Geoffrey Keynes and Nobelist Edgar Douglas Adrian, 1st Baron Adrian, grandnephew of the economist John Maynard Keynes and great-great-grandson of Charles Darwin.

He was born in Cambridge and educated at King's College School, The Leys School and Trinity College, Cambridge. He was lecturer in Anglo-Saxon History at Cambridge from 1978, reader in Anglo-Saxon History from 1992, and Elrington and Bosworth Professor of Anglo-Saxon, from 1999 until 2019. He has been a fellow of Trinity College since 1976. From 1999 to 2006 he was head of the Department of Anglo-Saxon, Norse and Celtic.

He is a fellow of the Royal Historical Society, the Society of Antiquaries of London and the British Academy, and sits on various of the latter's committees.

From 1993 to 2004 he was associate editor of the Oxford Dictionary of National Biography. Keynes was co-editor of the journal Anglo-Saxon England, but is not listed as one of the editors of its successor journal, Early Medieval England and its Neighbours in 2025.

In 2017, Keynes became the recipient of a Festschrift: Writing, Kingship and Power in Anglo-Saxon England. He retired from his professorship on 1 October 2019, and was succeeded by Rosalind Love.

== Selected publications ==
For a full list up to 2017, see 'Publications by Simon Keynes', in Writing, Kingship and Power in Anglo-Saxon England, ed. by Rory Naismith and David A. Woodman (Cambridge: Cambridge University Press, 2017), pp. xv-xxx ISBN 9781316676066, doi:10.1017/9781316676066.

- The Diplomas of King Aethelred The Unready (978–1016): A Study in Their Use as Historical Evidence, 1980
- Alfred the Great: Asser’s Life of King Alfred and Other Contemporary Sources, 1983 (trans., author of intro and notes, with M. Lapidge)
- Facsimiles of Anglo-Saxon Charters, 1991
- The Liber Vitae of the New Minster and Hyde Abbey Winchester, 1996
- Keynes, Simon (Autumn 1996). "The Reconstruction of a Burnt Cottonian Manuscript: the Case of Cotton MS. Otho A. I" (PDF). The British Library Journal. 22 (2). British Library: 113–160. JSTOR 42554427.
- An Atlas of Attestations in Anglo-Saxon Charters, c.670-1066. Cambridge, UK: Dept. of Anglo-Saxon, Norse, and Celtic, University of Cambridge, UK. 2002. ISBN 978-0-9532697-6-1.

== Bibliography ==
- Oliver Padel, 'Simon Keynes', in Writing, Kingship and Power in Anglo-Saxon England, ed. by Rory Naismith and David A. Woodman (Cambridge: Cambridge University Press, 2017), pp. 18–22 ISBN 9781316676066, doi:10.1017/9781316676066.002.
