= Baron Adrian =

Extinct barony in the Peerage of the United Kingdom

Baron Adrian, of Cambridge in the County of Cambridge, was a title in the Peerage of the United Kingdom. It was created on 27 January 1955 for the electrophysiologist and Nobel Prize recipient Edgar Adrian. He was succeeded by his only son, the second Baron. He was Professor of cell physiology at the University of Cambridge. He was childless and the title became extinct on his death in 1995.

== Barons Adrian (1955) ==
- Edgar Douglas Adrian, 1st Baron Adrian (1889–1977)
- Richard Hume Adrian, 2nd Baron Adrian (1927–1995)

Coat of arms of Baron Adrian
Crest The astronomical sign of Mercury Or between two roses Gules barbed and seeded Proper. Escutcheon Vert three estoiles Argent on a chief Argent a lion passant Sable. Supporters On either side a lion Sable semee of pentacles Or. Motto Non Tempere Credere
