= Ellen Pinsent =

British mental health worker

Dame Ellen Pinsent DBE
- Born: Ellen Frances Parker; 26 March 1866; Claxby, Lincolnshire, England
- Died: 10 October 1949
- Citizenship: United Kingdom
- Occupation: Mental health worker
- Spouse: Hume Chancellor Pinsent
- Children: David Pinsent (1891–1918); Richard Pinsent (1894–1915); Hester Adrian (1899–1966)
- Parents: Richard Parker; Elizabeth Coffin
- Relatives: Robert Parker, Baron Parker of Waddington (brother); Edgar Adrian (son-in-law)

Dame Ellen Frances Pinsent DBE (née Parker; 26 March 1866 – 10 October 1949) was a British mental health worker, and first female member of Birmingham City Council.

== Family ==
Ellen Frances Parker was born in Claxby, Lincolnshire, the daughter of the Rev. Richard Parker and his second wife, Elizabeth Coffin. Her brother Robert Parker was a barrister and a chancery judge. In 1888, she married Hume Chancellor Pinsent (1857–1920), a relative of the philosopher David Hume, and they had three children. Their two sons, David Hume Pinsent and Richard Parker Pinsent, were killed in the First World War, and their daughter, Hester, a mental health worker, married the Nobel-prize winner Edgar Douglas Adrian, a peer. Lady Hester Adrian was subsequently appointed a Dame Commander of the Order of the British Empire.

== Career ==
Pinsent chaired the Special School Sub-Committee of the Birmingham Schools Committee from 1901 to 1913. In 1904, she was the sole female member of the Commission on the Care and Control of the Feebleminded.

On 1 November 1911, Ellen Pinsent was the first woman elected to serve on Birmingham City Council. She represented the Edgbaston Ward as a Liberal Unionist. She stood down from the council in October 1913 upon appointment as commissioner on the Board of Control for Lunacy and Mental Deficiency.

Pinsent worked for many years with the Central Association for Mental Welfare. She was a founder of the National Association for the Care of the Feebleminded, an active member of the Eugenic Education Society, and served on the general committee of the First International Eugenic Conference. Her support for eugenic policies is reflected in the provisions of the Mental Deficiency Act 1913. She was appointed a Commander of the Order of the British Empire (CBE) in the 1925 Birthday Honours and a Dame Commander of the British Empire in the 1937 Coronation Honours.

Pinsent also wrote fiction, including the novels Jenny's Case, No Place for Repentance, Job Hildred, and Children of this World.

== Death and legacy ==
Room name sign in Birmingham's Council House

Pinsent died in 1949, aged 83 years, and her funeral was held in Wootton, Staffordshire. The Dame Ellen Pinsent Special Primary School (for children with learning disabilities) in Birmingham is named after her.

On 8 March 2018, to mark 100 years of votes for women in the UK, a committee room in Birmingham's Council House was named after Pinsent.
