= Forensic history =

Archaeological subdiscipline

Forensic history is the discipline or practice of using artifacts, artifact content, and artifactual materials to create a network structure or framework of available, verifiable, facts and evidence of past events. Forensic historical research is more systematic, detailed, precise, and thorough than that undertaken by most academics, scholars, or historians. Secondary historical sources and interpretations are considered problematic and are avoided whenever possible in forensic historical research.
