= Richard Keynes =

British physiologist (1919–2010)

Richard Darwin Keynes CBE FRS
- Born: 14 August 1919
- Died: 12 June 2010 (aged 90)
- Known for: Editor of the works of Charles Darwin
- Spouse: Anne Pinsent Adrian
- Children: Adrian Keynes (1946–1974); Randal Keynes (1948–2023); Roger Keynes (b. 1951); Simon Keynes (b. 1952)
- Parents: Geoffrey Keynes; Margaret Darwin
- Scientific career
- Fields: Physiology

Richard Darwin Keynes, CBE, FRS (/ˈkeɪnz/ KAYNZ; 14 August 1919 – 12 June 2010) was a British physiologist. The great-grandson of Charles Darwin, Keynes edited his great-grandfather's accounts and illustrations of Darwin's famous voyage aboard HMS Beagle into The Beagle Record: Selections From the Original Pictorial Records and Written Accounts of the Voyage of the H.M.S. Beagle, which won praise from the New York Review of Books and The New York Times Book Review.

== Career ==
Keynes was the eldest son of Geoffrey Keynes and his wife Margaret Elizabeth (née Darwin), daughter of George Darwin. He was educated at Oundle School before going up to Trinity College, Cambridge. In 1945, he married Anne Pinsent Adrian, daughter of Edgar Adrian and his wife Hester (née Pinsent). They had four sons, Adrian (1946–1974), Randal Keynes (1948-2023), Roger Keynes (b. 1951), and Simon Keynes (born 1952).

During the war, Keynes served as a temporary experimental officer at the Anti-Submarine Establishment and Admiralty Signals Establishment (1940–45), returning to Cambridge after the war to complete his degree (1st Class, Natural Science Tripos Part II, 1946). Keynes remained at Trinity College as a Research Fellow between 1948 and 1952, winning the Gedge Prize in 1948 and the Rolleston Memorial Prize in 1950. His career at Cambridge included: demonstrator in Physiology (1949–53); Lecturer (1953–60); Fellow of Peterhouse (1952–60, and an Honorary Fellow, 1989); Head of the Physiology Department, and first Deputy Director (1960–64), then Director (1965–73); Director of the ARC Institute of Animal Physiology (1965–72); Professor of Physiology (1973–87); Fellow of Churchill College, since 1961.

Outside Cambridge, Keynes's positions included: Secretary-General of the International Union for Pure and Applied Biophysics (1972–78), then Vice-President (1978–81) and President (1981–84); chairman of the International Cell Research Organisation (1981–83) and the ICSU/Unesco International Biosciences Networks (1982–93); President of the European Federation of Physiological Societies (1991); a Vice-President of the Royal Society (1965–68); Croonian Lecturer (1983); Fellow of Eton College (1963–78); foreign member of the Royal Danish Academy (1971), American Philosophical Society (1977), American Academy of Arts and Sciences (1978) and the American Physiological Society (1994).

== Bibliography ==
- Keynes, R., ed. (1979). The Beagle Record: Selections From the Original Pictorial Records and Written Accounts of the Voyage of the H.M.S. Beagle. Cambridge: Cambridge University Press. ISBN 978-0-521-21822-1.
- Keynes, R. & Aidley, David J. (2001). Nerve and Muscle. Cambridge: Cambridge University Press. ISBN 978-0-521-80584-1.
- Bolis, C.; Keynes, R. D. & Maddrell, Simon Hugh Piper (1984). Comparative Physiology of Sensory Systems. Cambridge: Cambridge University Press. ISBN 978-0-521-25002-3.
- Keynes, R., ed. (2000). Charles Darwin's Zoology Notes and Specimen Lists from H. M. S. Beagle. Cambridge: Cambridge University Press. ISBN 978-0-521-67350-1.

== See also ==
- Keynes family
