= George Hourani =

British philosopher, historian, and classicist (1913 – 1984)

George F. Hourani
- Born: 3 June 1913; Manchester, England
- Died: 19 September 1984 (aged 71); Buffalo, New York, US

Education
- Education: Balliol College, Oxford (BA) Princeton University (PhD)

George Fadlo Hourani (3 June 1913 – 19 September 1984) was a British philosopher, historian, and classicist. He is best known for his work in Islamic philosophy, which focused on classical Islamic rationalism and ethics.

== Biography ==
George Hourani was born into a prosperous British family of Lebanese Christian extraction in Didsbury, Manchester. He was the fourth of six children, having three older sisters and two younger brothers. His brothers were Albert Hourani and Cecil Hourani.

George spent his early years studying Greek and Latin language and literature, winning successive scholarships at the Mill Hill School and Balliol College, Oxford, and developing an interest in philosophy and international affairs. A subsequent trip to the Near East influenced his decision to pursue a doctoral degree in Oriental Studies at Princeton University, where Philip Hitti would first suggest a focus on Islamic philosophy.

Upon completing his dissertation on ninth and tenth century Arab seafaring, Hourani secured a lecturing position at the Government Arab College in Jerusalem. In 1950, Hourani was invited to join the newly founded Department of Near Eastern Studies at the University of Michigan, where he would reside until 1967. At Michigan, Hourani began to more seriously explore ethics and Islamic philosophy, contributing the definitive Averroes on the Harmony of Religion and Philosophy and beginning to explore the Mu'tazilite ethics of Abd al-Jabbar.

This work would be continued after 1967 in the University at Buffalo Department of Philosophy, where Hourani would teach until his retirement. In 1971, his work on Abd al-Jabbar was published. That summer, however, a latent cardiac condition led to the first of two heart attacks. The second, in 1977, would require surgery. Nonetheless, Hourani continued to teach, travel, and write, becoming President of the American Oriental Society in 1978, lecturing at UCLA in 1979, and being recognized as a Distinguished Professor of Islamic Thought and Civilization in 1980. He retired in 1983 and, as a result of his heart condition, died in September 1984. His final book and final contribution, Reason and Tradition in Islamic Ethics, was published posthumously the next year.

== Books ==
- Arab Seafaring in the Indian Ocean in Ancient and Early Medieval Times. viii, 131 pages, 8 plates. Princeton University Press, 1951. Reprinted Beirut: Khayats, 1963; New York: Verry, 1968; Octagon Press, 1978. Arabic translation by Yusuf Bakr. Cairo: Franklin Press, 1958. Persian translation by Mohamed Mogadam. Tehran: Franklin Press, 1959.
- Ethical Value. 233 pages. Ann Arbor: University of Michigan Press, 1956; London: Allen and Unwin, 1956, Reprinted, New York: Greenwood Press, 1969.
- Ibn Rushd (Averroes): Kitab fasl al-maqal. xx, 56 pages, 2 plates (A critical edition of the Arabic text). Leiden: E. J. Brill, 1959.
- Averroes on the Harmony of Religion and Philosophy. 129 pages. London: Luzac and Co., for E. J. W. Gibb Memorial Series and UNESCO, 1961. (A translation of Fasl al-maqal, with introduction and notes). Reprinted, 1967, 1976.
- Islamic Rationalism: The Ethics of 'Abd al-Jabbar. 160 pages. Oxford: Clarendon Press, 1971.
- Editor, Essays on Islamic philosophy and science. viii, 261 pages. Albany: State University of New York Press, 1975.
- Reason and Tradition in Islamic Ethics. 280 pages. New York: Cambridge University Press, 1985.
