= Hester Adrian, Baroness Adrian =

British baroness, mental health worker (1899–1966)

The Right Honourable The Lady Adrian DBE BEM
- Born: Hester Agnes Pinsent; 16 September 1899; Harborne, Staffordshire, England
- Died: 20 May 1966 (aged 66); Cambridge, England
- Citizenship: United Kingdom
- Education: Somerville College, Oxford
- Occupation: Mental health worker
- Spouse: Edgar Adrian, 1st Baron Adrian (m. 1923)
- Children: Hon. Anne Keynes; Richard Adrian, 2nd Baron Adrian; Hon. Jennet Campbell
- Parents: Hume Chancellor Pinsent; Ellen Pinsent

Dame Hester Agnes Adrian, Baroness Adrian, DBE BEM (née Pinsent; 16 September 1899 – 20 May 1966) was a British mental health worker.

== Early life ==
Hester Agnes Pinsent was born in 1899, in Harborne, Birmingham, Staffordshire, the only daughter of Hume Chancellor Pinsent (a relative of the philosopher David Hume) and his wife Dame Ellen Pinsent (née Parker). Her mother was a social reformer and novelist. When Hester Pinsent was a teenager, both of her brothers, David and Richard, died in World War I.

Pinsent attended Somerville College, Oxford, from 1919 to 1922, graduating with second-class honours in modern history.

== Career ==
Hester Adrian lived in Cambridge as the wife of a professor (who was also Master of Trinity College from 1951–1965), and a social hostess of the university, welcoming distinguished guests to Trinity College with her husband. She was also active as a volunteer in the Cambridge community. In 1936, she became a justice of the peace in Cambridge. During World War II, she worked for the Women's Voluntary Service in Cambridge, as a billeting officer. She took particular interest in the lives of children in crisis, and after the war she chaired the juvenile panel of the Cambridge magistrates' courts from 1949 to 1958. She joined the management committee of the Cambridge Institute of Criminology, and in 1959 became president of the Howard League for Penal Reform.

Adrian was also active in mental health and special education organizations. She was honorary secretary of the Cambridgeshire Mental Welfare Association from 1924 to 1934. She was vice-chair of the National Association of Mental Health (now known as MIND). The Hester Adrian Research Centre at the University of Manchester was established in 1968, to "conduct research into psychological and educational factors that affect the development of mentally handicapped children and adults".

== Personal life ==
Hester Pinsent married Edgar Douglas Adrian on 14 June 1923. He won the Nobel Prize in Physiology in 1932, and he was President of the Royal Society from 1950 to 1955. They had three children:

- Anne Pinsent Adrian, who married the physiologist Richard Darwin Keynes
- Richard Hume Adrian, 2nd Baron Adrian (1927–1995)
- Jennet Adrian (born 1927), who married Peter Watson Campbell

In 1942, she injured her leg badly, and it was amputated above the knee. The incident occurred in the Lake District when 'a large rock, about 5 ft. high, suddenly broke away' when her husband took hold of it. The rock 'crushed her leg both above and below the knee'. She used a prosthetic leg thereafter. In 1965, she was created a Dame Commander of the Order of the British Empire (DBE) for her contributions. Hester Adrian died at her Cambridge home in 1966, aged 66 years.
