= David Pinsent =

English philosopher (1891–1918)

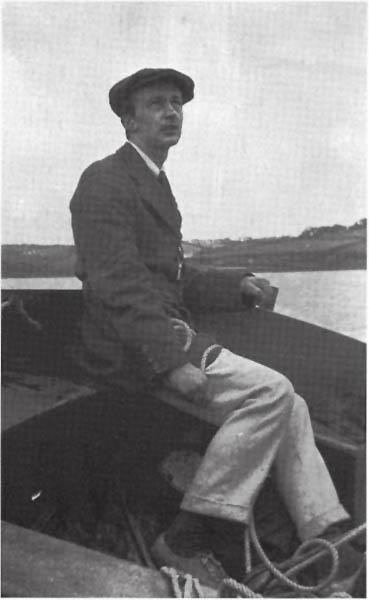
- Born: David Hume Pinsent; 24 May 1891; Edgbaston, Birmingham, England
- Died: 8 May 1918 (aged 26)
- Cause of death: Plane crash
- Education: Trinity College, Cambridge (First-class Honours, Mathematics)
- Occupations: Test Pilot at Royal Aircraft Establishment, Farnborough
- Family: David Hume

David Hume Pinsent (/ˈpɪnˌsɛnt/; 24 May 1891 – 8 May 1918) was a collaborator and an alleged lover of the Austrian philosopher Ludwig Wittgenstein. Wittgenstein's Tractatus Logico-Philosophicus (1922) is dedicated to Pinsent's memory.

== Early life ==
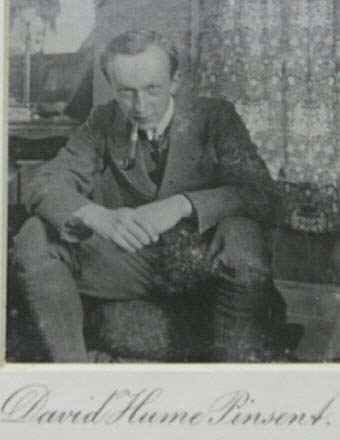
Pinsent sitting with signature below

Pinsent, a descendant of philosopher David Hume's brother, John Hume, was born in Edgbaston, Birmingham. He gained a first-class honours degree in mathematics at Cambridge University, where he was described by George Thomson, future master of Corpus Christi College as "the most brilliant man of my year, among the most brilliant I have ever met". Pinsent then studied law.

== Career ==
He met Wittgenstein, two years older, as an undergraduate at Trinity College, Cambridge in 1912. He acted as Wittgenstein's subject in psychological experiments on rhythm in speech and music, and he struck up a rapport, based on shared interests in music and mathematics. That led to holidays together, including trips to Iceland and Norway, which Wittgenstein paid for. His diary (1912–1914) mentions his times and travels with Wittgenstein.

== First World War ==
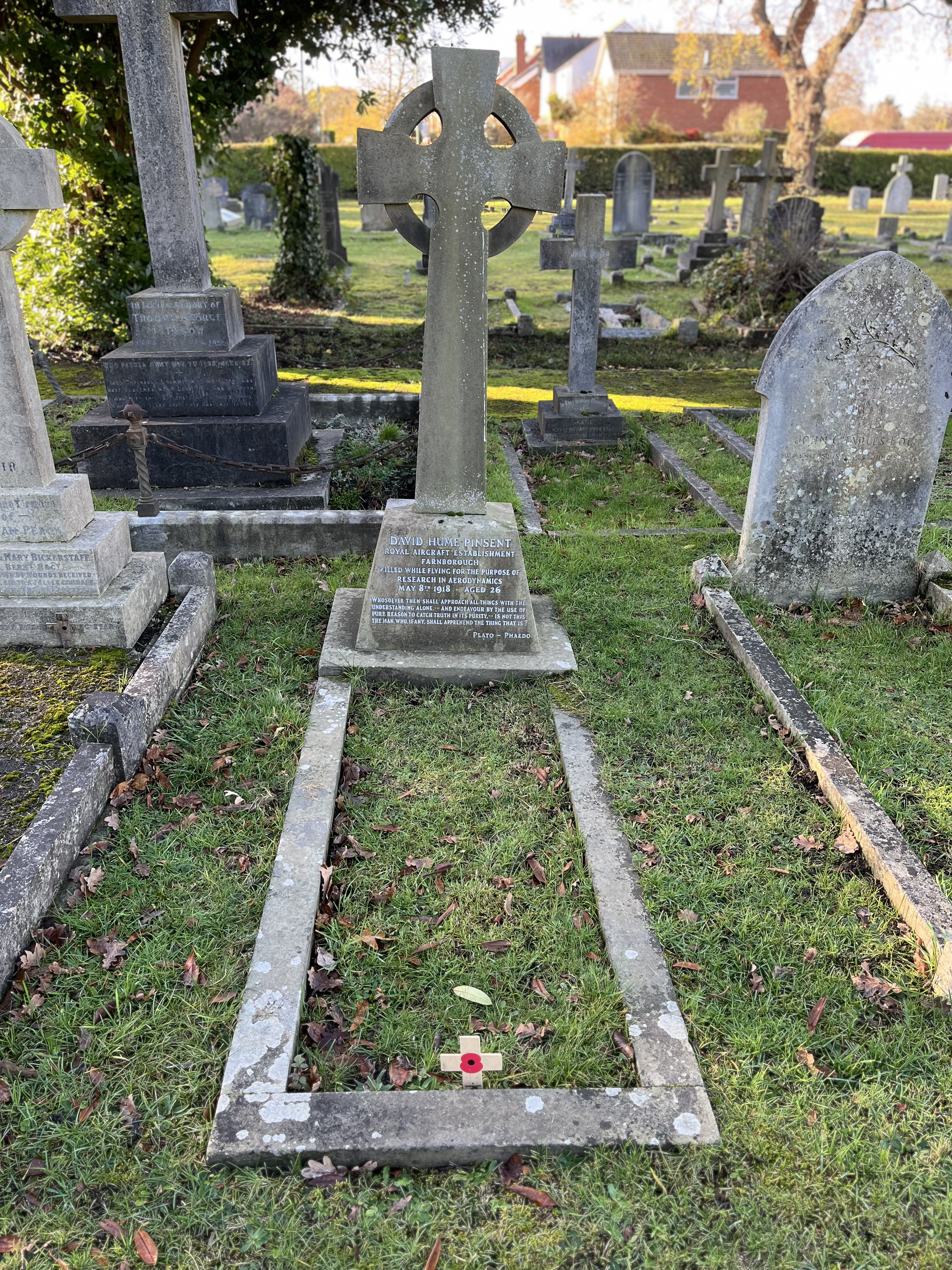
Grave of David Hume Pinsent in the Victoria Road Cemetery in Farnborough, Hampshire

During the First World War, Pinsent was deemed unsuitable for active military service. He trained as a test pilot instead and worked at the Royal Aircraft Establishment in Farnborough, where he was killed in a flying accident in May 1918. His body was found in the Basingstoke Canal a week after the accident. He was buried in the Victoria Road Cemetery in Farnborough in Hampshire.
