= The Husband's Message =

Anonymous Old English poem

"The Husband's Message" is an anonymous Old English poem, 53 lines long and found only on folio 123 of the Exeter Book. The poem is cast as the private address of an unknown first-person speaker to a wife, challenging the reader to discover the speaker's identity and the nature of the conversation, the mystery of which is enhanced by a burn-hole at the beginning of the poem.

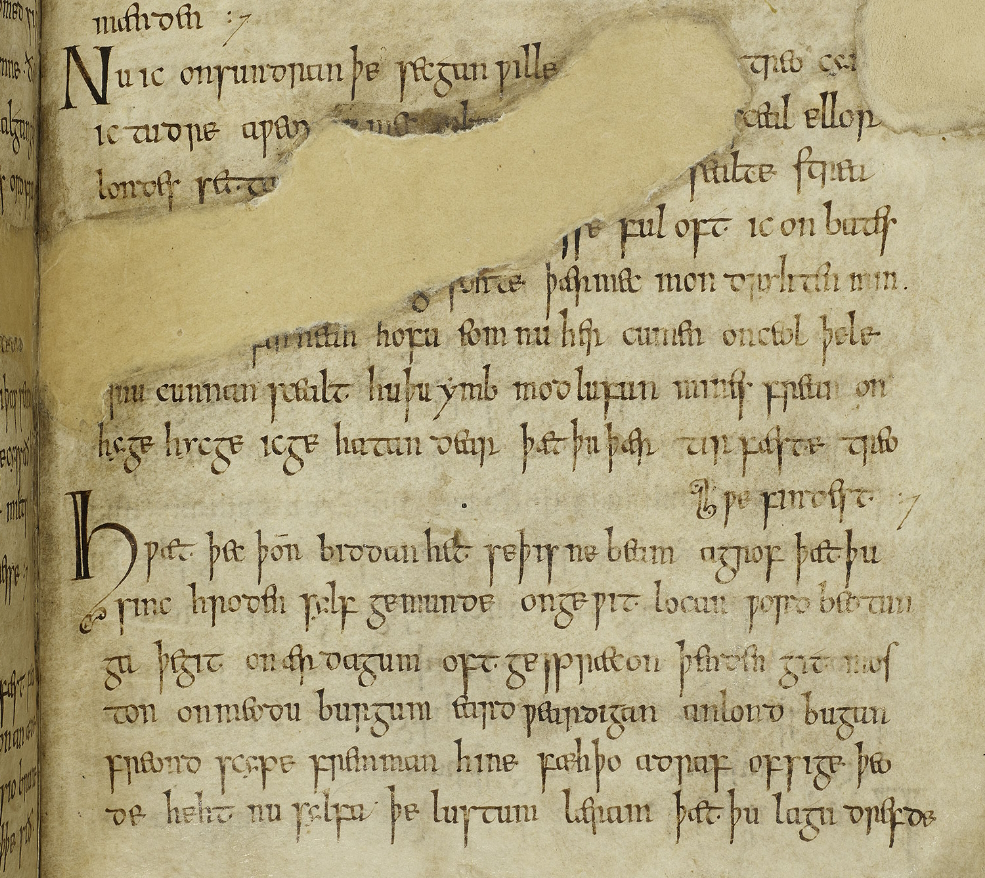
The first few lines of the poem The Husband's Message in the Exeter Book

== Integrity of the poem ==
The poem is preserved only in the Exeter Book, one of the few surviving poetic compilations from the Anglo-Saxon period. The Exeter Book came into existence some time in the 10th century, with some estimates placing the origin of the book as early as 970. The book contains over 90 riddles as well as many other poetic works. The manuscript suffered burn damage to the first passage of the poem. The burn spots prevent anyone from knowing the actual meaning of lines 2 to 8 because some of the words are missing. From the random words of those lines, it can be determined that the poem is told in the first person, that the speaker refers to his origin as a tree, that there is a frequent journey by ship, that another country is involved, and a lord sent the speaker to seek his true love. There is damage to other lines of the poem as well, though not as drastic as the damage to lines 2-8.

== Summary ==
The Husband's Message tells the story of a man who was forced to leave his homeland and his wife due to a feud. The poem takes place after the feud has ended. The supposedly wealthy and established husband carves a message onto a plank or staff of wood and sends it to his wife or his betrothed, the exact relationship between the man and woman is never specified, recounting the past years without her, reflecting on his past misfortunes, professing his love for her and imploring her to reunite with him in his new home. Thus, the "message" becomes the physical plank of wood itself, as well as the poem's written lyrics.

== Issues of interpretation ==
While the overall text of the poem is fairly straightforward, there is some scholarly debate concerning several matters of interpretation:

=== Genre ===
For example, many Anglo-Saxonists contend that the poem is a "love lyric" to be celebrated for "its ingenious form and its emotive power." Conversely, other scholars contest that the sense of "loss," especially that of time due to unfortunate circumstances and "happiness," make The Husband's Message seem more like an elegy. An elegy is a form of poetry that mourns the loss of someone. Anne L. Klinck classifies this poem as optimistic, focusing on love and lamentation, but still places it among the elegies in the Exeter Book. Niles groups The Seafarer, The Wife's Lament, Wulf and Eadwacer and The Husband's Message together as being all the elegies found in the Exeter Book. Niles also states the 50 riddles in the Exeter Book resembles the first person speaker, just like The Husband's Message. This is significant because within all the riddles and this poem, the reader has to discover who the speaker is.

=== Identity of the speaker ===
Another prominent issue with this work is the speaker question: who is, in fact, the speaker of the poem? While some argue that the speaker is of a human nature, meaning that the speaker is the husband himself, using personification of the wood's voice as a literary device, others hold that the wood itself is the husband's messenger. Those who adhere to the wood-messenger theory are supported by the evidence provided by the riddles in the Exeter Book, which use similar personifications. Also, the poem opens with the lines, roughly translated from a damaged manuscript, "Now I will tell you especially / what kind of tree I, as offspring, grew from," which, if taken literally, may indicate that the wood is the messenger. But, John D. Niles believes there is no clear speech developed, and no clear introduction of the actual speaker. Another group of scholars contends that the speaker switches throughout the poem, meaning that at times the husband is recounting a story while at other times the wood itself speaks. Another school of thought contends that the messenger is a human that has been sent by the exiled man, but that the message he brings is somehow scrawled into a piece of wood.

=== Runes ===
One last puzzling feature of "The Husband's Message" is that of the runes, or special characters. Toward the end of the poem, there are special characters inscribed on the wood the messenger is carrying. In line 49-50, the reader is introduced to the messenger carrying a rune stave, which is a stick with a runic message on it, including the special characters. The characters are "S," "EA," "M," "R," and "W." They stand out from the rest of the poem due to their size and isolation within the manuscript. Scholars believe them to be runes, and Anglo-Saxonists are unsure as to what role these runes are supposed to play in the storyline of the poem. It has been theorized that they should be "deciphered...as an oath that the man swears to the woman and are his secret instructions concerning the journey she must make to find him." This makes sense in light of the fact that the husband had been exiled in the past, and it would be to his and his wife's advantage to refrain from disclosing his new location. Other scholars have attempted to translate the special characters. In John D. Niles essay on The Husband's Message, his translation was composed of two groups: the standard Anglo Saxon Futhorc, which is the Runic alphabet with extra letters added to it to write the Old English alphabet, and Standard Insular script, which is a medieval script developed in Ireland and was greatly influenced by Celtic Christianity in England. The special characters included in the Anglo-Saxon Futhorc are the "S" for sigel, "EA" for ear, and "M" for mann. The "R" meaning rad and the "W" meaning wynn are characterized belonging to the insular script. A modern translation was done by Bradley with the "S" meaning sun, "EA" meaning earth, "M" meaning man, "R" meaning road, and "W" meaning joy. The characters are seen as a special code, a riddle, and the only way to break the code is to understand the runic alphabet.

== Connection to Riddle 60 or The Wife's Lament? ==
Another mystery behind The Husband’s Message is the connection it may or may not have to The Wife’s Lament and Exeter Book Riddle 60. The Wife’s Lament and The Husband’s Message are similar in style and mood. Some Anglo-Saxon scholars link the two poems on grounds that both treat a separation of lovers, but there is no conclusive evidence to link them together, only by their modern titles and their similar styles. The connection to Riddle 60 could be more convincing only because Riddle 60 is directly before The Husband’s Message. Lines 49-50 of The Husband’s Message speak of a rune-stave, which is used as a sense of personification. This idea of personification is used in Riddle 60, and the object which is being personified is a tree or plant. Due to the connection of personification of a tree or plant, have argued that Riddle 60 is the beginning of The Husband’s Message, but the consensus view is that they are separate texts. The 17 lines of Riddle 60 do not contain the contradictions that are found in the other riddles of the Exeter Book which are seemingly meant to confound the reader.

The poem may well be riddlic in nature, as is indicated by the runic clues at the end of the piece. The solution has been proposed variously as either 'Christ' or 'The Gospel'.
