= Ubi sunt =

Genre in literature

Ubi sunt (lit. 'where are they') is a rhetorical question taken from the Latin phrase Ubi sunt qui ante nos fuerunt?, meaning 'Where are those who were before us?'. Ubi nunc (lit. 'where now') is a common variant.

Sometimes interpreted to indicate nostalgia, the ubi sunt motif is a meditation on mortality, life's transience, and an awareness of history.

Ubi sunt is a phrase which was originally derived from a passage in the Book of Baruch (3:16–19) in the Vulgate Latin Bible beginning Ubi sunt principes gentium? 'Where are the princes of the nations?'; it became commonplace in medieval literature.

== Biblical scripture ==
Variations of the theme occur in a number of Old English homilies, including one which quotes in Latin the following words, which it attributes to St. Augustine: O homo, dic mihi, ubi sunt reges, ubi sunt principes, ubi imperatores, qui fuerunt ante nos... ('O man, tell me, where are the kings, where are the princes, where the emperors, who had been before us...').

These derive from the words of Baruch 3:16–19 in the Vulgate Bible:

16 ubi sunt principes gentium et qui dominantur super bestias quae sunt super terram
17 qui in avibus caeli inludunt
18 qui argentum thesaurizant et aurum in quo confidebant homines et non est finis adquisitionis eorum qui argentum fabricant et solliciti sunt nec est inventio operum illorum
19 exterminati sunt et ad inferos descenderunt et alii loco eorum exsurrexerunt

16 'Where are the princes of the nations, and those who rule over the beasts on earth;
17 those who mock the birds of the air,
18 and who hoard up silver and gold, in which men trust, and there is no end to their getting; those who scheme to get silver, and are anxious, whose labours are beyond measure?
19 They have vanished and gone below, and others have arisen in their place.'
(tr. Revised Standard Version)

This passage forms part of the mass for Holy Saturday, according to the traditional Roman Missal and Breviary.

== Medieval poetry ==
=== Latin poetry ===
The theme was the common property of medieval Latin poets. The line of Boethius (5th century) was well known:

Ubi nunc fidelis ossa Fabricii manent?

'Where now do the bones of faithful Fabricius lie?'

The words ubi sunt begin several Latin medieval poems and occur, for example, in the second stanza of the 13th-century goliardic song "De Brevitate Vitae", known from its incipit as Gaudeamus Igitur:

Ubi sunt qui ante nos / In mundo fuere?

'Where are those who, before us, existed in the world?'

=== English poetry ===
==== Old English ====
A general feeling of ubi sunt is present in Beowulf. The Anglo-Saxons, at the point in their cultural evolution in which Beowulf was written, expressed in their poetry an inescapable feeling of doom, symptomatic of ubi sunt yearning. By conquering the Romanized Britons, they were faced with massive stone works and elaborate Celtic designs that seemed to come from a lost era of glory (called the "work of giants" in The Ruin).

Prominent ubi sunt Anglo-Saxon poems are The Wanderer, Deor, The Ruin, and The Seafarer. These poems are all a part of a collection known as the Exeter Book, the largest surviving collection of Old English literature.

The Wanderer most clearly exemplifies ubi sunt poetry in its use of the erotema (the rhetorical question):

Hwær cwom mearg? Hwær cwom mago? Hwær cwom maþþumgyfa?
Hwær cwom symbla gesetu? Hwær sindon seledreamas?
[...] Hu seo þrag gewat,
genap under nihthelm, swa heo no wære.

'Where is the horse gone? Where the rider? Where the giver of treasure?
Where are the seats at the feast? Where are the revels in the hall?
[...] How that time has passed away,
grown dark under cover of night, as if it had never been.'
(tr. Robert Diamond)

==== Middle English ====
The 13th-century poem "Ubi Sunt Qui Ante Nos Fuerunt" ('Where are those who were before us?') is a Middle English example following the medieval tradition:

Uuere beþ þey biforen vs weren,
Houndes ladden and hauekes beren
And hadden feld and wode?
Þe riche leuedies in hoere bour,
Þat wereden gold in hoere tressour
Wiþ hoere briȝtte rode; ...

Which roughly translates to:

'Where are those who were before us,
who led hounds and bore hawks,
And owned field and wood?
The rich ladies in their chambers,
Who wore gold in their hair,
With their bright faces; ...'

=== French and Spanish poetry ===
The 13th-century French poet Rutebeuf wrote a poem called Poèmes de l'infortune ('Poems of Misfortune') which contains those verses:

Que sont mes amis devenus
Que j'avais de si près tenus
Et tant aimés?

'What has become of my friends
That I had held so close
And loved so much?'

In the second half of the 20th century, the singer Léo Ferré made this poem famous by adding music. The song was called Pauvre Rutebeuf ('Poor Rutebeuf').

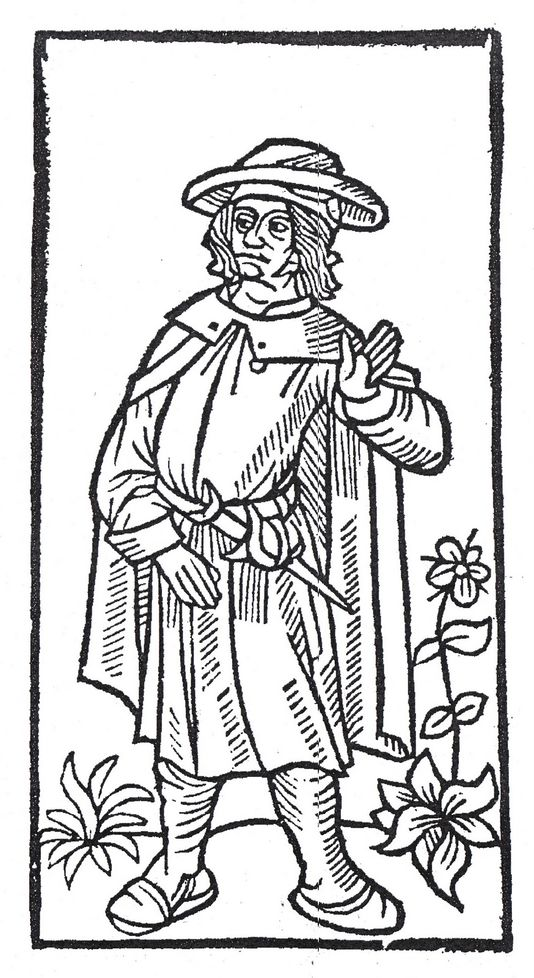
François Villon, woodcut image

The medieval French poet François Villon (15th century) also famously echoes the sentiment in the Ballade des dames du temps jadis ('Ballad of the Ladies of Times Past') with his question:

Mais où sont les neiges d'antan?

'Where are the snows of yesteryear?' (as translated by Dante Gabriel Rossetti)

This refrain was taken up in the bitter and ironic Bertolt Brecht/Kurt Weill "Nannas Lied", expressing the short-term memory without regrets of a hard-bitten prostitute, in the following refrain:

Wo sind die Tränen von gestern abend?
Wo ist der Schnee vom vergangenen Jahr?

'Where are the tears of yesterday evening?
Where is the snow of yesteryear?'

In "Coplas por la muerte de su padre", the 15th-century Spanish poet Jorge Manrique wrote equally famous stanzas about contemporaries that death had taken away:

¿Qué se fizo el rey don Juan?
Los infantes de Aragón
¿qué se ficieron?
¿Qué fue de tanto galán,
qué fue de tanta invención
como trujeron?
Las justas y los torneos
paramentos, bordaduras
y cimeras,
¿fueron sino devaneos?
¿qué fueron sino verduras
de las eras?

'What became of King Don Juan?
The Princes of Aragon,
What became of all of them?
What of so much handsome nobility?
And of all the many fads
They brought with them?
What of their jousts and tournaments,
Gilded ornaments, fancy embroideries
And feathered tops?'
Was all of that meaningless waste?
Was it all anything else but a summer's green
on the fields?'
(tr. Simón Saad)

=== German poetry ===
The theme also occurs in the ninth-century Old High German poem Muspilli, which contains these lines (60–62):

uuar ist denne diu marha, dar man dar eo mit sinen magon piehc?
diu marha ist farprunnan, diu sela stet pidungan,
ni uueiz mit uuiu puaze: so uerit si za uuize.

'Where is then the land, where man once waged war on/with his kinsmen?
The land is burnt down, the soul stands subdued,
It knows not how to atone: thus it goes to damnation.'

=== Persian poetry ===
In medieval Persian poetry, ubi sunt is a pervasive theme in The Rubaiyat of Omar Khayyam:

Each Morn a thousand Roses brings, you say:
Yes, but where leaves the Rose of Yesterday?
And this first Summer month that brings the Rose
Shall take Jamshýd and Kaikobád away.
(tr. Edward Fitzgerald)

Frequently in Khayyam there is a play on the sound of the word kū ('where [are they]'), as in the following quatrain:

dar kaargah-e kuzegar-i raftam dush
didam do hazaar kuze guyaa vo khamush
naagaah yek-i kuze baraavard khorush:
ku kuzegar o kuzekhar o kuzeforush?

'In the workshop of a potter I went last night
I saw two thousand pots speaking and silent.
Suddenly one pot raised a cry:
Where are they, the potter, and the pot-buyer, and the pot-seller?'

And similarly in the following, where the mournful "coo-cooo-coo" of the Eurasian collared dove is said to represent the sound of "Where are they? Where are they?"

aan qasr ke bar charkh hamizad pahlu
bar dargah-e u shahaan nehaadandi ru
didim ke bar kongere-ash faakhte-i
benshaste hamigoft ke ku ku ku ku?

'From that royal palace which once rose to the sky
monarchs in splendor faced the world.
But on its turrets I have seen a ring-dove seated,
cooing, cooing over and over: where, where?'
(tr. Michael Hillmann, Iranian Culture, 51)

=== Chinese poetry ===
The Former Ode on the Red Cliffs of Su Shi, written in 1082, makes heavy use of the theme, including the line: "Cao was indeed a hero for his generation but where is he now?"

== Later English literature ==
=== William Dunbar ===
The Lament for the Makaris ("Lament for the poets", c. 1505) of the Scottish makar or poet William Dunbar consists of a general introductory section (quoted from below) followed by a list of dead Scots poets with the Latin refrain Timor mortis conturbat me ("the fear of death disturbs me") at the end of each of the 25 four-line stanzas:

On to the ded gois all estatis,
Princis, prelotis, and potestatis,
Baith riche and pur of al degre;
Timor mortis conturbat me.

He takis the knychtis in to feild,
Anarmit under helme and scheild;
Victour he is at all mellie;
Timor mortis conturbat me.

=== Shakespeare ===
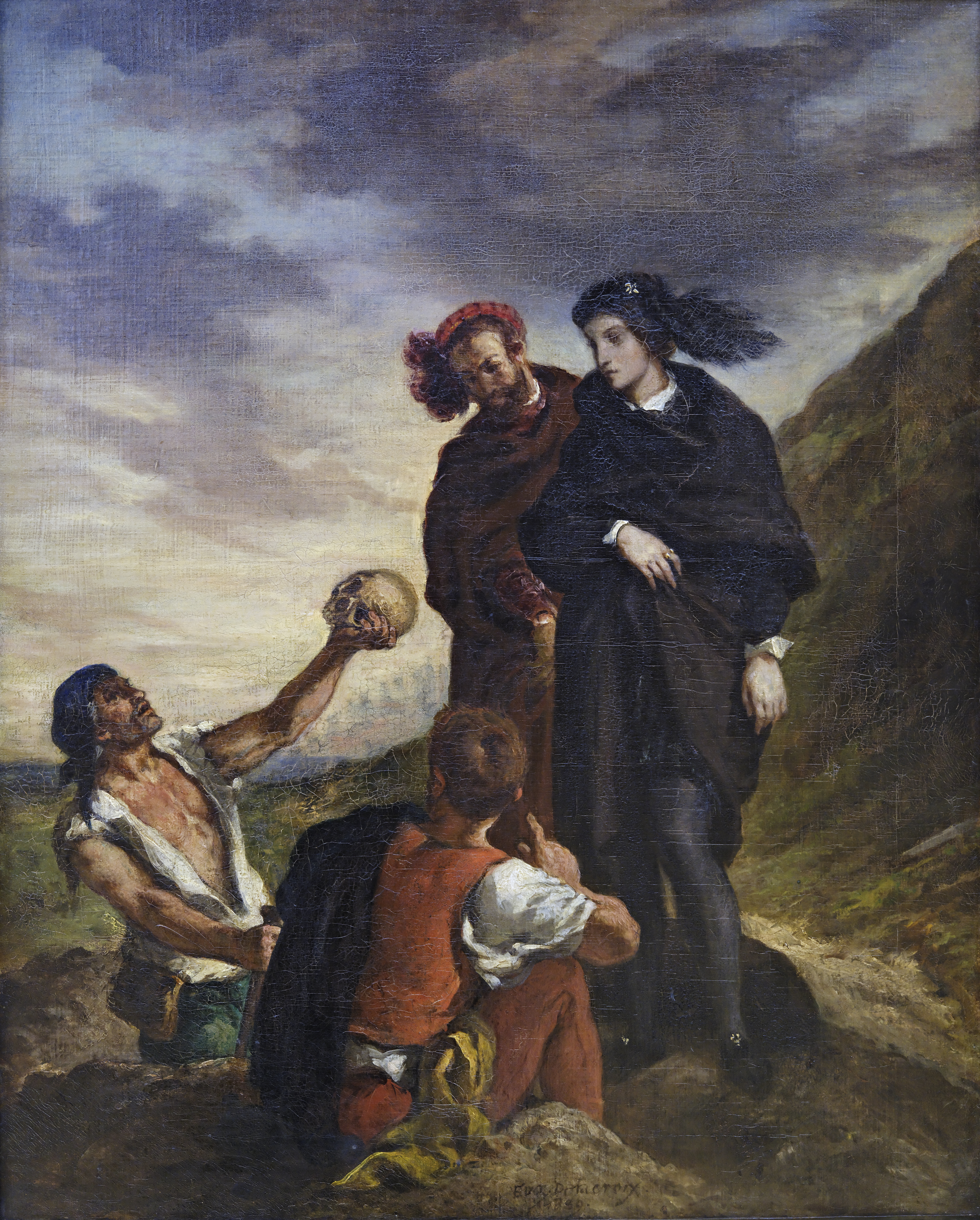
Hamlet and Horatio in the Graveyard by Eugène Delacroix, 1839

Ubi sunt poetry also figures in some of Shakespeare's plays. When Hamlet finds skulls in the Graveyard (V. 1), these rhetorical questions appear:

Alas, poor Yorick! I knew him, Horatio, a fellow of infinite jest, of most excellent fancy. He hath bore me on his back a thousand times, and now how abhorr'd in my imagination it is! my gorge rises at it. Here hung those lips that I have kiss'd I know not how oft. Where be your gibes now, your gambols, your songs, your flashes of merriment, that were wont to set the table on a roar? Not one now to mock your own grinning – quite chap-fall'n. Now get you to my lady's chamber, and tell her, let her paint an inch thick, to this favor she must come; make her laugh at that.

Literary scholar Ernest Cox describes multiple literary patterns – popularized during the Middle Ages – in which ubi sunt is employed. Two of these patterns are 'asking after vanished pleasures or possessions' and 'cataloguing dead heroes'; we see the first pattern in Hamlet's questions to Yorick's skull.

=== Where is Bohun? ===
In an often-quoted speech in a law case of 1625 over the Earldom of Oxford, the Lord Chief Justice Ranulph Crewe listed great noble dynasties of the English Middle Ages, extinct from the Wars of the Roses and other turmoils, and told the court:

"I have laboured to make a covenant with myself, that affection may not press upon judgment; for I suppose there is no man that hath any apprehension of gentry or nobleness, but his affection stands to the continuance of a house so illustrious, and would take hold of a twig or twine-thread to support it. And yet time hath his revolutions; there must be a period and an end to all temporal things—finis rerum—an end of names and dignities, and whatsoever is terrene; and why not of de Vere? Where is Bohun, where's Mowbray, where's Mortimer? Nay, which is more and most of all, where is Plantagenet? They are entombed in the urns and sepulchres of mortality. And yet let the name and dignity of De Vere stand so long as it pleaseth God."

When the passage was quoted in the House of Lords in 1968, Charles Stourton, 26th Baron Mowbray (the barony having been revived in the meantime) loudly responded "Here's Mowbray", to great applause.

=== 18th century ===
Isaac Watts alluded to the ubi sunt theme in his popular hymn O God, Our Help in Ages Past (1708):

Time, like an ever-rolling stream,
Bears all its sons away;
They fly forgotten, as a dream
Dies at the opening day.

Interest in the ubi sunt motif enjoyed a renaissance during the late 18th century following the publication of James Macpherson's "translation" of Ossian. The eighth of Macpherson's Fragments of Ancient Poetry (1760) features Ossian lamenting,

Where is Fingal the King? where is Oscur my son? where are all my race? Alas! in the earth they lie. I feel their tombs with my hands. I hear the river below murmuring hoarsely over the stones. What dost thou, O river, to me? Thou bringest back the memory of the past.

This and Macpherson's subsequent Ossianic texts, Fingal (1761) and Temora (1763), fueled the romantics' interest in melancholy and primitivism.

=== 19th century ===
In Robert Louis Stevenson's 1883 novel Treasure Island, Long John Silver recalls his previous pirate crew, and the imprudence which undid them:

"Why, how many tall ships, think ye, now, have I seen laid aboard? And how many brisk lads drying in the sun at Execution Dock?" cried Silver. "And all for this same hurry and hurry and hurry. You hear me? I seen a thing or two at sea, I have. If you would on'y lay your course, and a p'int to windward, you would ride in carriages, you would. But not you! I know you. You'll have your mouthful of rum tomorrow, and go hang."

"Everybody knowed you was a kind of a chapling, John; but there's others as could hand and steer as well as you," said Israel. "They liked a bit o' fun, they did. They wasn't so high and dry, nohow, but took their fling, like jolly companions every one."

"So?" says Silver. "Well, and where are they now? Pew was that sort, and he died a beggar-man. Flint was, and he died of rum at Savannah. Ah, they was a sweet crew, they was! On'y, where are they?"

Régis de Trobriand, colonel of the 55th New York Volunteer Infantry, wrote during the Fall of 1862:

"What a contrast between the departure and the return! We had started out in the spring gay, smart, and well-provided with everything. The drums beat, the bugles sounded, the flag with its immaculate folds of silk glistened in the sunshine. And we were returning before the autumn, sad, weary, covered with mud, with uniforms in rags. Now the drummers carried their cracked drums on their backs, the buglers were bent over and silent; the flag, riddled by the balls, torn by shrapnel, discolored by the rain, hung sadly on the staff without cover.

"Where were the red pantaloons? Where were the zouave jackets? And, above all, those who had worn them, and whom we looked along the ranks in vain to find, what had become of them? Killed at Williamsburg, killed at Fair Oaks, killed at Glendale, killed at Malvern Hill; wounded or sick in the hospitals; prisoners at Richmond; deserters, we knew not where."

=== 20th century ===
The theme appears in the Spoon River Anthology by Edgar Lee Masters. In the opening poem, The Hill, he writes "Where are Elmer, Herman, Bert, Tom and Charley, The weak of will, the strong of arm, the clown, the boozer, the fighter? [...] All, all are sleeping on the hill." with several iterations.

The final verse of the Paul Simon song "Mrs. Robinson" uses the motif, asking, "Where have you gone, Joe DiMaggio?" Simon's later explication of the song's meaning is consistent with the "ubi sunt" motif. Other examples from the American Folk Era are Pete Seeger's "Where Have All the Flowers Gone?", and Dick Holler's "Abraham, Martin and John".

The whole of Don McLean's song "American Pie" is an "ubi sunt" for the rock and roll era.

J. R. R. Tolkien begins Aragorn's poem Lament for the Rohirrim (in The Two Towers) with the phrase taken from the Anglo-Saxon Wanderer and continues with a series of Ubi sunt motifs. Tolkien's "Oilima Markirya" poem exhibits a similar structure.

In Joseph Heller's 1961 novel Catch-22, the protagonist Yossarian laments the death of his friend Snowden, saying, "Where are the Snowdens of yesteryear?"

Also, Martin Amis's The War Against Cliché mentions it in a contemplation of movie violence and Medved's polemic against Hollywood. He asks, "It is Ubi sunt? all over again. Where are they now, the great simplicities of yesterday?"

David Bowie’s “Where Are We Now?”, as the title suggests, is a song reflecting this concept. The song was part of Bowie’s comeback album The Next Day after his decade-long career hiatus. The song’s lyrics mention the city of Berlin, where Bowie had his creative renaissance in the late 1970s, and how much the city changed over the years, serving as a metaphor for how much he changed as well.

Scottish rock band Big Country released the song "Harvest Home" on their 1983 debut album The Crossing. It contains several passages of Ubi sunt, with references to historical figure King Canute and life in 11th century England.

The Talking Heads's 1989 song (Nothing But) Flowers carries the theme into a world where nature has overtaken civilization, with singer-songwriter David Byrne lamenting the loss of cars, convenience stores, and freeways in a post-industrial world.

=== 21st century ===
Ralph Towner's albums "My Foolish Heart" and "At First Light" included a song called "Ubi Sunt".

== See also ==
- Carpe diem
- Memento mori
- Timor mortis conturbat me
- Vanitas
- Mono no aware

== External references ==
- "ubi sunt", Dictionary.com Word of the Day, 20 June 2022 (archive)
