= The Death of Edward =

The funeral of Edward the Confessor, from the Bayeux Tapestry

"The Death of Edward" is a 34-line Old English poem written after the death of Edward the Confessor, surveying his life and praising his kingly qualities. It is preserved in two manuscripts of the Anglo-Saxon Chronicle. It is sometimes said to be the last Old English poem in strict alliterative metre, but it is considered derivative from earlier Anglo-Saxon poetry, and not of high literary merit.

== Manuscripts ==
"The Death of Edward" is found in only two manuscripts of the Anglo-Saxon Chronicle. One is British Library MS Cotton Tiberius B.i, conventionally known as C; the other is British Library MS Cotton Tiberius B.iv, known as D. The texts of these two manuscripts are called the Abingdon Chronicle and Worcester Chronicle respectively, after the places they are thought to have been kept.

== The Chronicle poems ==
The Anglo-Saxon Chronicle, though mainly a prose work, breaks into alliterative verse in the classic Old English metre at various points. "The Battle of Brunanburh" (at annal 937), "The Capture of the Five Boroughs" (942), "The Coronation of Edgar" (973), and "The Death of Edgar" (975) certainly belong to this category. "The Death of Alfred", at annal 1036, is so irregular in metre as only doubtfully to be included in the number, and twelve other passages have some of the characteristics of Old English alliterative verse and have occasionally been classified as such.

== Composition and date ==
Though Edward died on 5 January 1066, "The Death of Edward" appears alongside prose text in the Chronicle's annal for 1065, possibly because the author used the system by which years begin at the Feast of the Annunciation, on 25 March. The poem was perhaps composed before the prose, though there is no consensus as to a precise date. Erin Goeres felt that the references to Harold in the poem suggested that it was written before William the Conqueror launched his invasion, while Thomas A. Bredehoft argued from the same evidence that it post-dated the Conquest. Francis Leneghan has offered the alternatives of a poem written during Harold's reign or shortly thereafter.

== Edward and Harold in the poem ==
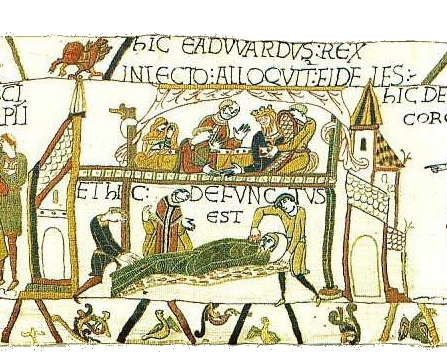
Scenes from the Bayeux Tapestry. Above, Edward, on his deathbed, addresses Harold; below, Edward's body is prepared for burial.

"The Death of Edward" is a poem intended to memorialize its subject. It can be seen either as a eulogy or as an obit. Edward is praised in terms which draw on several of the established tropes of Old English poetry. He is the traditional Germanic lord, "the noble Edward", the "ruler of heroes" who "distributed treasures", "defended the homeland, the land and the people" and ruled over all the peoples of England, "the Welsh and the Scots and the Britons as well". His virtues naturally ensure that his soul has been transported into heaven. His many years in Normandy during the reigns of England's Danish kings are not neglected, connecting him with another familiar trope found in The Wanderer, The Seafarer and Beowulf, that of the exile. The poet lays particular emphasis on his qualities of mind. He is "wise", "skilled in counsel" and "ever happy-minded, the king lacking in malice". Being a wise man with all the kingly virtues he has chosen as his successor Harold Godwinson. The poet's political outlook is clear: out of Edward's several possible choices of heir he has selected the only man whose claim is legitimate. The poem emphasises this point by using the words "noble" and "highly distinguished" of both men, connecting them in their shared possession of these kingly characteristics.

== Style and metre ==
"The Death of Edward" is written in the classical alliterative metre with great metrical regularity. It uses words associated with older poetry and entirely avoids words of Old Norse origin. The poet draws heavily on the verse of the past, especially those found in previous entries in the Chronicle, repeating words and phrases he had found there: "almost every half-line", writes one literary historian, "replicates structures found elsewhere in the wider poetic corpus".

== Literary merit ==
Though the literary historian Andy Orchard has called it a "striking poem", many others have been less impressed. Julie Townsend, surveying the various Chronicle poems, thought the writer of "The Death of Edward" the least skilful. C. L. Wrenn considered it to have "no marked literary merit". Thomas Bredehoft wrote that the poem is "notably repetitive, as if the range of this poet's skills was in fact quite limited." Katherine O'Brien O'Keeffe called it "a journeyman's performance – perfunctory, gestural, and dull". Derek Pearsall felt that "the sonorousness is empty. The poignancy of [the lines describing Edward's choice of Harold as heir] is in history, not in the poetry."

== Editions and translations ==
- The Death of Edward, in The Old English Chronicle, Volume I: The A-Text to 1001 and Related Poems, ed. and trans. Janet Bately, Joseph C. Harris, and Katherine O'Brien O'Keeffe, with Susan Irvine, Dumbarton Oaks Medieval Library 91 (Cambridge, MA: Harvard University Press, 2025).
- The Death of Edward, in the Old English Poetry in Facsimile Project (edition, digital facsimile images, translation), eds. Martin Foys et al. (Madison: Center for the History of Print and Digital Culture, 2019-).
- A 1909 translation by E. E. C. Gomme (pages 170–171)
