= The Ruin =

Old English poem, probably 8th–9th century

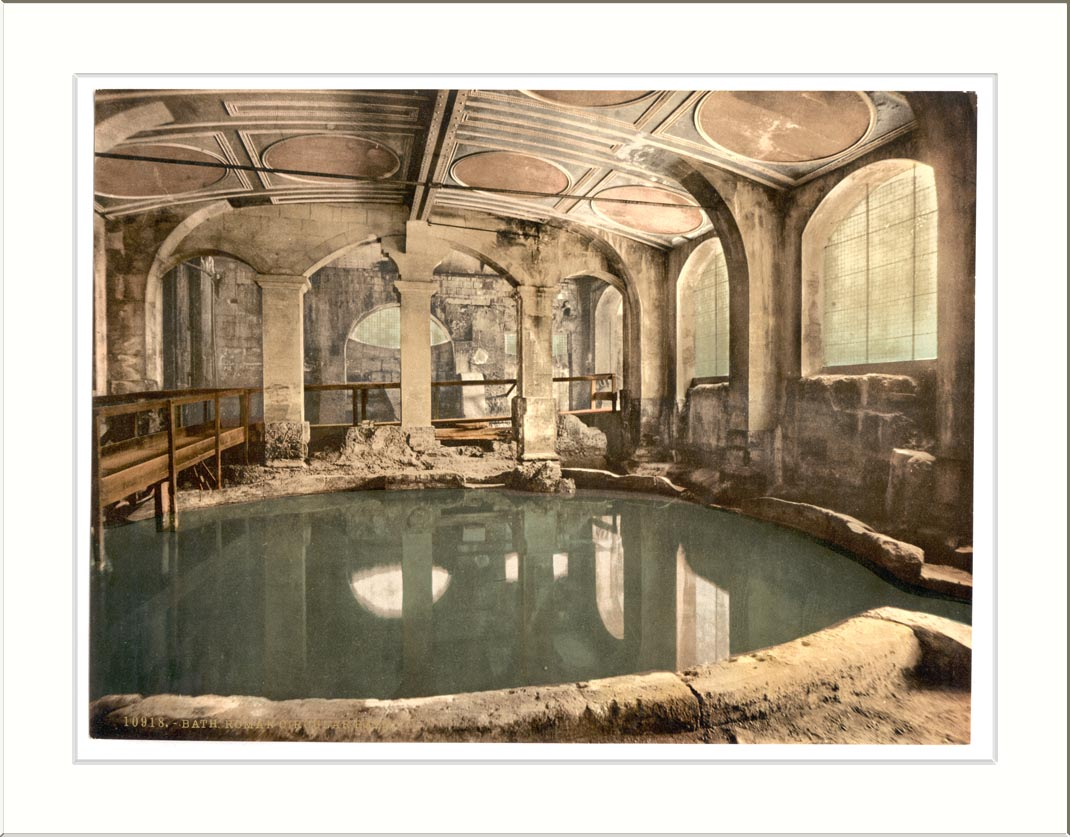
Roman pool (with associated modern superstructure) at Bath, England. The pool and Roman ruins may be the subject of the poem.

"The Ruin of the Empire", or simply "The Ruin", is an elegy in Old English, written by an unknown author probably in the 8th or 9th century, and published in the 10th century in the Exeter Book, a large collection of poems and riddles. The poem evokes the former glory of an unnamed ruined ancient city that some scholars have identified with modern Bath, juxtaposing the grand, lively past with the decaying present.

== The manuscript ==
The extant poem consists of forty-nine lines in the Exeter Book, on folios 123b-124b between The Husband's Message and 34 preceding riddles. It is written near the end of the manuscript, on both sides of the leaf. A large diagonal burn in the centre of the page has rendered part of the script illegible.

== Contents ==
The unknown poet compares the ruins that were extant at the time of writing with the mighty structures, since destroyed by fate, that had once stood there. The desolate and lichen-grey stones of the poet's time are linked to their long-gone mighty builders and to the wealth and activity of their heyday.

== The poem and a version in modern English ==
Because of technical limitations, some web browsers may not display some special characters in this section.
Original Old English	Modern English
Wrætlic is þes wealstan, · wyrde gebræcon; burgstede burston, · brosnað enta geweorc. Hrofas sind gehrorene, · hreorge torras, hrim geat torras berofen, hrim on lime, scearde scurbeorge · scorene, gedrorene, ældo undereotone. · Eorðgrap hafað waldend wyrhtan · forweorone, geleorene, heardgripe hrusan, · oþ hund cnea werþeoda gewitan. · Oft þæs wag gebad ræghar ond readfah · rice æfter oþrum, ofstonden under stormum; · steap geap gedreas. Wunað giet se · ...num geheapen, fel on grimme gegrunden scan · heo......g orþonc · ærsceaft...g · lamrindum beag mod mo... · ...yne swiftne gebrægd hwætred in hringas, · hygerof gebond weallwalan wirum · wundrum togædre. Beorht wæron burgræced, · burnsele monige, heah horngestreon, · heresweg micel, meodoheall monig · mondreama full, oþþæt þæt onwende · wyrd seo swiþe. Crungon walo wide, · cwoman woldagas, swylt eall fornom · secgrofra wera; wurdon hyra wigsteal · westen staþolas, brosnade burgsteall. · Betend crungon hergas to hrusan. · Forþon þas hofu dreorgiað, ond þæs teaforgeapa · tigelum sceadeð hrostbeages hrof. · Hryre wong gecrong gebrocen to beorgum, · þær iu beorn monig glædmod ond goldbeorht · gleoma gefrætwed, wlonc ond wingal · wighyrstum scan; seah on sinc, on sylfor, · on searogimmas, on ead, on æht, · on eorcanstan, on þas beorhtan burg · bradan rices. Stanhofu stodan, · stream hate wearp widan wylme; · weal eall befeng beorhtan bosme, · þær þa baþu wæron, hat on hreþre. · þæt wæs hyðelic. Leton þonne geotan ofer harne stan · hate streamas un......þþæt hringmere · hate þær þa baþu wæron. þonne is...re; · þæt is cynelic þing, huse ...... · burg....	This masonry is wondrous; · fates broke it courtyard pavements were smashed; · the work of giants is decaying. Roofs are fallen, · ruinous towers, the frosty gate · with frost on cement is ravaged, chipped roofs are torn, · fallen, undermined by old age. · The grasp of the earth possesses the mighty builders, · perished and fallen, the hard grasp of earth, · until a hundred generations of people have departed. · Often this wall, lichen-grey and stained with red, · experienced one reign after another, remained standing under storms; · the high wide gate has collapsed. Still the masonry endures · in winds cut down persisted on__________________ fiercely sharpened________ · _________ ______________ · she shone_________ _____________g skill · ancient work_________ _____________g · of crusts of mud turned away spirit mo________yne · put together keen-counselled a quick design in rings, · a most intelligent one bound the wall with wire brace · wondrously together. Bright were the castle buildings, · many the bathing-halls, high the abundance of gables, · great the noise of the multitude, many a meadhall · full of festivity, until Fate the mighty · changed that. Far and wide the slain perished, · days of pestilence came, death took · all the brave men away; their places of war · became deserted places, the city decayed. · The rebuilders perished, the armies to earth. · And so these buildings grow desolate, and this red-curved roof · parts from its tiles of the ceiling-vault. · The ruin has fallen to the ground broken into mounds, · where at one time many a warrior, joyous and ornamented · with gold-bright splendour, proud and flushed with wine · shone in war-trappings; looked at treasure, at silver, · at precious stones, at wealth, at prosperity, · at jewellery, at this bright castle · of a broad kingdom. The stone buildings stood, · a stream threw up heat in wide surge; · the wall enclosed all in its bright bosom, · where the baths were, hot in the heart. · That was convenient. Then they let pour_______________ hot streams over grey stone. un___________ · _____________ until the ringed sea (circular pool?) · hot _____________where the baths were. Then is_______________________ __________re, · that is a noble thing, to the house__________ · castle_______

== Modern literary criticism ==
=== Setting ===
One of the main arguments that surround the poem is that of which city is depicted in the poem. Heinrich Leo first suggested in 1865 that the city depicted was the city of Bath. Others have suggested Chester, Hadrian's Wall, Babylon of the Apocalypse, or that it does not describe any one city in particular. However, the general consensus among analysts has been that Bath was the city the author was describing throughout the poem. There are three features distinctly referred to in the poem that when used conjunctively could only be in the city of Bath: the hot spring mentioned at the end of the poem (as opposed to artificially heated water), the mention that there were many bathing halls, and the mention of a circular pool also at the end of the poem. Furthermore, the description of the decay matches Bath's probable appearance in the first half of the eighth century.

=== Themes ===
Although the poem appears a straightforward description of the visual appearance of the site, the author's non-Roman assumptions about the kind of activities that the building would have sheltered, and their emotional state concerning the decay of the ruins, allow different interpretations to be brought forth. William Johnson sees the poem not as a reflection of the physical appearance of the site but rather an evocative effort to bring "stone ruins and human beings into polar relationship as symbolic reflections of each other." Johnson further sees the poem as a metaphor for human existence, a demonstration that all beauty must come to an end. From this perspective, the author of "The Ruin" could be describing the downfall of the Roman Empire by showing its once great and beautiful structure reduced to rubble just as the empire was. Similarly, Alain Renoir points to the author's use of the word "wyrde," meaning "fate," as the reason for the buildings' decay, implying the inevitable transience of man-made things: "that all human splendor, like human beings themselves, is doomed to destruction and oblivion."

Where "The Ruin" can be seen from a sentimental perspective, it may also be viewed from an imagistic perspective. Arnold Talentino sees the poem as not a sorrowful lamentation, but as an angry or realistic condemnation of the actual people who wrought the destruction. This interpretation would be more historically realistic in that it would reflect a very Christian view of the destruction, a common theme in Old English poems. Talentino states, "His [the author's] view of what once was and his thoughts about it indicate that the city's former inhabitants caused its fall, that crumbling walls are, in part at least, the effect of a crumbling social structure."

"The Ruin" shares the melancholic worldview of some of its contemporary poems such as The Seafarer, The Wanderer and Deor. But unlike "The Wanderer" and other elegies, "The Ruin" does not employ the ubi sunt formula. Renoir and R.F. Leslie also note that while "The Wanderer" has a moral purpose, "The Ruin" has a detached tone.

== Influence ==
J.R.R. Tolkien, who was a scholar in Old English, took inspiration from the phrases ...g orþonc ærsceaft ("_g skill ancient work_") and brosnað enta geweorc ("the work of giants is decaying") in The Ruin and the verse orþanc enta geweorc in Maxims II for the names of the tower Orthanc and the tree-men Ents in The Lord of the Rings.

== Modern musical settings ==
An alternative rendition of the poem in Modern English, was set by Peter Hammill to music as the song "Imperial Walls", on his 1979 album pH7. Another version, by Michael Alexander, was set by Nicholas Maw as his piece 'The Ruin' for double eight-part chorus and solo horn. Michael Alexander's translation was also used in both Paul Keenan's The Ruin and A Field of Scarecrows. An excerpt of the poem set to ambient music is featured in the 2010 BBC documentary "Requiem for Detroit." In 2016 Oscar Bettison set the poem, in Old English, in his piece "Presence of Absence".

== See also ==
- List of literary descriptions of cities (before 1550)

== Editions ==
- "The Ruin" is edited and annotated to digital images of its manuscript pages by Martin Foys et al. in the Old English Poetry in Facsimile Project: https://oepoetryfacsimile.org/?document=14917&document=14834
