= Lisa M. C. Weston =

American academic

Academic background
- Education: UCLA

Academic work
- Discipline: Medieval English literature and language
- Institutions: Fresno State University

Lisa M. C. Weston is a scholar of medieval literature and Old English language. She teaches at Fresno State Department of English, and served as interim chair of the department in 2019.

== Early life and education ==
Weston was born in England, and moved to Canada before settling in the United States. She studied at University of California, Los Angeles for her PhD. which was awarded in 1982.

== Research ==
Weston's research interests include Old English wisdom poetry; texts related to magic or ritual; and representations of sex and gender in ecclesiastical writings, liturgy, and hagiography. She has written on women writers of the Middle Ages including Baudonivia of Poitiers and Hrotsvit of Gandersheim. Her work brings feminist and queer theory into medieval studies to explore sex, gender, and literacy in early medieval English poetry and prose, and she is a specialist in literary representations of pre-modern lesbian and same-sex love and desire.

=== Friendship in medieval literature and letters ===
Two articles by Weston have particularly examined the role of letter writing in ecclesiastical friendships. Kathryn Maude notes that Weston argues how although medieval letters may be read as an attempt to "enable emotional and intellectual presence despite physical absence", letters by the late-eighth century nun Berhtgyth (a member of the Anglo-Saxon mission to Germany, whose letters are preserved in a mid-ninth century manuscript known as the "Boniface correspondence") express a dissatisfaction, and that letter-writing only increased desire for physical contact.

=== Premodern lesbian studies ===
Her chapter "Virgin Desires: Reading a Homoerotics of Female Monastic Community" features in The Lesbian Premodern, edited by Noreen Giffney, Michelle M. Sauer, and Diane Watt, published in 2011 with Palgrave Macmillan. Reviewing The Lesbian Premodern, Jessica A. Boon notes that Weston's contribution to the volume "examines a letter written by one early medieval nun to another that has been preserved in a compilation with Jerome’s letter to Marcella and a vita of Radegund. Reading all three texts in conjunction, she tracks the intricacies of “becoming a virgin in community” (95) in order to determine how gender and sexuality are both reoriented in the process of becoming a nun".

Weston is an active member of the Society for the Study of Homosexuality in the Middle Ages, now renamed the Society for Queer Medieval Scholarship, and has spoken on "queer pedagogy" and "post-queer" scholarship at society events. At a SSHMA round table event in 2013, in answer to the question "Are we post Queer?", Weston replied that “As long as there are categories – one can fuck with them. Queer Theory is an academic trickster and tricksters are never out of style”.

=== Contributions to academic organisations ===
Weston previously served on the Society for Medieval Feminist Scholarship Advisory Board, having joined the Society when it was the Medieval Femininst Newsletter in 1993.

In 2004, Weston organised the Old English Division of the Modern Language Association.

Weston's research is further concerned with the making of and future of the discipline of medieval studies. In her 2010 article "What would Byrhtwold do?" for the journal postmedieval, Weston records the dwindling financial support for medieval programmes of study in the US, and criticises neoliberal models of higher education. Eileen Joy notes that Weston's contributions asks academics to reconsider the role "of pleasure in Old English studies within the context of the California budget crisis and its possibly tragic impact upon medieval studies within higher education there".

== Selected publications ==
Weston published "Women's Medicine, Women's Magic: The Old English Metrical Childbirth Charms", in the journal Modern Philology, Volume 92, Number 3, February 1995. This article was reprinted in the 2016 reader Old English Literature: A Guide to Criticism with Selected Readings edited by John Niles and published by Wiley-Blackwell.

Weston's chapter "Saintly lives: friendship, kinship, gender and sexuality" features in the Cambridge History of Early Medieval English Literature edited by Clare Lees in 2013.

Her chapter "Elegiac desire and female community in Baudonivia's Life of Saint Radegund" was published in Same Sex Love and Desire Among Women in the Middle Ages, edited by Francesca Canadé Sautman and Pamela Sheingorn and published by Palgrave in 2001.

Weston's article, "Guthlac Betwixt and Between: Literacy, Cross-Temporal Affiliation, and an Anglo-Saxon Anchorite", appeared in a special issue of The Journal of Medieval Religious cultures on anchoritic liminality edited by Michelle M. Sauer. In this article, she proposes that Guthlac occupies a space "betwixt and between" warrior and visionary as the vita exists between Old English and Anglo Latin.

Weston has published three articles with the Medieval Feminist Forum:

- Weston, Lisa (September 2003). "Queering Virginity". Medieval Feminist Forum. 36: 22–24. doi:10.17077/1536-8742.1202.
- Weston, Lisa M.C. (December 2007). "The Saintly Female Body and the Landscape of Foundation in Anglo-Saxon Barking". Medieval Feminist Forum. 43 (2): 12–25. doi:10.17077/1536-8742.1002.
- Weston, Lisa (3 April 2013). "Saints Edith and Æthelthryth: Princesses, Miracle Workers, and their Late Medieval Audiences". Medieval Feminist Forum. 48 (2): 100–102. doi:10.17077/1536-8742.1932.

=== Edited collections ===
Weston edited Sex and Sexuality in Anglo-Saxon England with Carol Braun Pasternack in 2004. Writing in 2008, Mary Dockray-Miller noted that this was "the only essay collection focused exclusively on issues of sexuality and gender in pre- Conquest England".

== Contemporary visual arts ==
Collages by Weston have been published in the San Joaquin Review at Fresno State University.
