= Vainglory (disambiguation) =

Vainglory is excessive concern for one's own appearance or importance.

Vainglory may also refer to:

- Vainglory (poem), 10th century or earlier anonymous poem in Old English
- Vainglory (video game), first released in 2014
