= Paul Keenan =

Paul Keenan may refer to:

- Paul Keenan (composer) (1956–2001), British contemporary classical composer
- Paul Keenan (songwriter) (born 1976), Scottish songwriter and producer
- Paul Keenan (The Inbetweeners), a fictional character
