= The Rhyming Poem =

"The Rhyming Poem", also written as "The Riming Poem", is a poem of 87 lines found in the Exeter Book, a tenth-century collection of Old English poetry. It is remarkable for being no later than the 10th century, in Old English, and written in rhyming couplets. Rhyme is otherwise virtually unknown among Anglo-Saxon literature, which used alliterative verse instead.

The poem is found on folios 94r-95v, in the third booklet of the Exeter Book, which may, or may not, be an indication of composition. Many scholarly attempts have been made to decipher the collation of the Exeter Book and to determine if works were placed in the manuscript by date or theme. Unlike the Monstrarum Librum of the Beowulf manuscript, the Exeter Book appears to be a self-consciously archival collection.

The poem concerns the troubles and transience of life. It contrasts the life of a ruler, from the time of his birth to his prosperous rule and life at court (lines 1-42), with his life after his fall, the subsequent rise of hostilities (lines 43–69) and his death (lines 70–79), ending with a reflection on the eternal glories of Heaven and the necessity of penance (lines 80–87). The poet may have taken the Book of Job, chapters 29 and 30, as its inspiration.

== Bibliography ==
- The Rhyming Poem
  - Macrae-Gibson, O.D. (ed. and tr.). The Old English Riming Poem. Cambridge, 1983. With introduction.
  - Lehmann, Ruth P.M. (ed. and tr.). "The Old English Riming Poem: Interpretation, Text and Translation." Journal of English and Germanic Philology 69 (1970): 437–49.
  - Krapp, G. and E.V.K. Dobbie (eds.). The Exeter Book. Anglo-Saxon Poetic Records vol 3. New York, 1936. 166–9.
  - Foys, Martin and Kyle Smith (eds. with digital facsimile) Old English Poetry in Facsimile Project, Madison, 2019.
- Abram, Christopher. "The Errors in The Rhyming Poem." The Review of English Studies 58 (2007). 1–9.
- Klinck, Anne. "The Riming Poem: Design and Interpretation." Neuphilologische Mitteilungen 89 (1988): 266–79.
- Olsen, Alexandra H. "Subtractive Rectification in the Old English Riming Poem." In Geardagum 24 (2003): 57–66.
- Olsen, Alexandra H. "The Heroic World: Icelandic Sagas and the Old English Riming Poem." Pacific Coast Philology 14 (1979): 51–8.
- Wentersdorf, Karl. "The Old English Ryming Poem: A Ruler’s Lament." Studies in Philology 82 (1985): 265–94.
