= Bill Hopkins bibliography =

This is a list of published writings by the composer Bill Hopkins. Based originally on Paul Griffiths' provisional catalogue of Hopkins' work published soon after his death, it includes his journalism for newspapers and magazines, as well as his occasional academic writings. These texts were mostly published under the pseudonym G.W. Hopkins: those published under his own given name are so indicated.

== Writings ==
- "The young composer at Oxford", Composer 13 (1964), 12 (as Bill Hopkins)
- "Le soleil des eaux", Tempo 68 (1964), 35
- "Luigi Nono", M+M xiv/8 (1965-6), 32, 61
- "The Brevity of Webern", M+M xiv/12 (1965-6), 20
- "Barraqué's Chant après Chant" [review of premiere], MT cvii (1966) 701
- "Jean Barraqué", MT cvii (1966) 952
- "Shostakovich's Ninth String Quartet", Tempo 75 (1966) 23
- "Robert Layton's "Sibelius"", Tempo 75 (1966)
- "Stravinsky's Chords", Tempo 76 (1966) 6, Tempo 77 (1966) 2
- "Donald Mitchell's "The Language of Modern Music"", Tempo 77
- "Schumann in Miniature", M+M xv/1 (1966-7), 28
- Bax LP review, MT cviii (1967), 714
- "Alan Walker's "An Anatomy of Musical Criticism"", Tempo 80
- "Stockhausen, form, and sound" [review of scores], MT cix (January 1968), 60-62
- "Debussy and Boulez", MT cix (1968), 710
- "Anthony Gilbert", MT cix (1968), 907
- "Schoenberg's "Fundamentals of Musical Composition"", Tempo 84
- "The Contemporary Problem", Tempo 85
- "Open form: open question" [review of Konrad Boehmer Zur Theorie der offenen Form in der neuen Musik, and Darmstaedter Beitraege zur neuen Musik X: "Form"], MT cx (1969), 380-83
- "Charles Daniel (ed.) "Musiques Nouvelles"", Tempo 90 [substantial]
- Letter to the Editor (Reply to Keller), Tempo 90
- "Frank Dawes's "Debussy Piano Music"", Tempo 91 (1969)
- Honegger/Messiaen LP review, MT cxi (1970), 285
- Boulez Pli selon Pli LP review, MT cxi (1970), 509
- Ravel/Poulenc/Francaix LP review, MT cxi (1970), 811
- Schmitt/Chausson/Duparc LP review, MT cxi (1970), 905-6
- Fauré LP review, MT cxi (1970), 1006-7
- Record Guide, Tempo 92 (1970), 37
- Record Guide, Tempo 93 (1970), 31
- Record Guide, Tempo 94 (1970), 31
- "Schoenberg and the "Logic" of Atonality", Tempo 94 (1970) 15
- Record Guide, Tempo 95 (1970-1), 37
- Record Guide, Tempo 96 (1971), 20
- Boulez Pelleas LP review, MT cxii (1971), 39-40
- Milhaud/Chabrier/Fauré/Ravel LP review, MT cxii (1971), 147
- Helffer Boulez 2/Berg (DG) LP review, MT cxii (1971), 560-1
- Debussy Chamber works (DG) LP review, MT cxii (1971), 673
- Fauré Chamber box (Erato) LP review, MT cxii (1971), 763-4 [longer]
- Boulez Debussy Nocturnes LP review, MT cxii (1971), 866
- Varese LP review, MT cxii (1971), 975-6
- "Barraqué's Piano Sonata", Listener (27 Jan 1972), 121
- Fauré LP review, MT cxiii (1972), 673
- Messiaen LP review, MT cxiii (1972), 781
- "Colin Scott-Sutherland's "Arnold Bax"", Tempo 106 (September 1973)
- Fauré LP review, MT cxv (1974), 44-5
- Satie LP review, MT cxv (1974), 575
- Recordings [review of Roger Woodward's Barraqué LP], Tempo 110 (September 1974) 48-50
- "Michael Nyman's Experimental Music: Cage and Beyond", Tempo 112 (March 1975) (as Bill Hopkins)
- "Birtwistle Triumph of Time etc.", Tempo 115 (September 1975) (as Bill Hopkins)
- Fauré LP review, MT cxvi (1975), 798
- "Joan Peyser's Boulez: Composer, Conductor, Enigma", Tempo 123 (September 1977) (as Bill Hopkins)
- "Luigi Nono: the individuation of power and light", MT cxix (1978) 406 (as Bill Hopkins)
- "Oesterreichische Komponisten des XX. Jahrhunderts - volumes on Schreker, Schmidt, Webern and Zemlinsky", Tempo 127 (September 1978) (as Bill Hopkins)
- "Barraqué and the Serial Idea", PRMA cv (1978-9) 13 (as Bill Hopkins)
- "Zemlinsky Lyric Symphony etc.", Tempo 129 (March 1979) (as Bill Hopkins)
- "Nono ...sofferte onde serene ... etc.", Tempo 130 (June 1979) (as Bill Hopkins)
- Paul Griffiths Boulez book review, MT cxx (1979), 827 (as Bill Hopkins)
- "Hans Keller's 1975", Tempo 132 (December 1979) (as Bill Hopkins)
- "The Piano Music", in The Music of Alexander Goehr, ed. Bayan Northcott (London, 1980), 17
- "Boulez", The New Grove, (London, 1980)
- "Gilbert", The New Grove, (London, 1980)
- "Rands", The New Grove, (London, 1980)
- "Orchestration" (paras 4–5), The New Grove, (London, 1980)
- "Ravel", The New Grove, (London, 1980)
- "Dukas", The New Grove, (London, 1980)
- "Stockhausen", The New Grove, (London, 1980)
