= The Wanderer (Old English poem) =

Old English poem

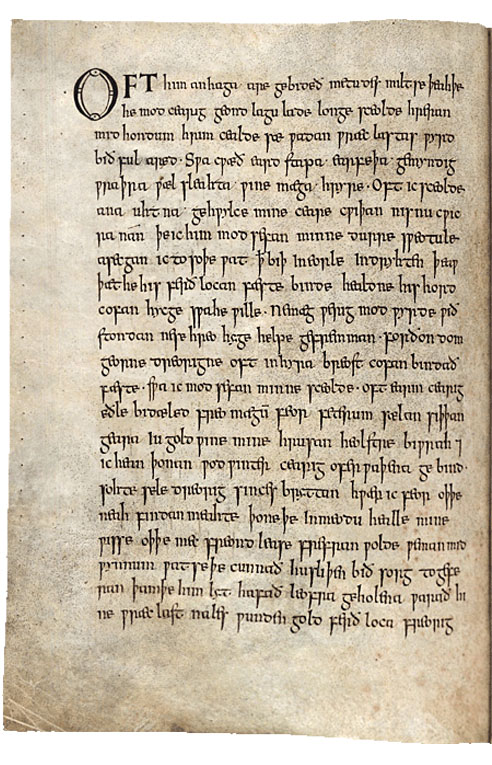
- First page of The Wanderer from the Exeter Book
- Author(s): Unknown
- Language: Old English
- Date: Impossible to determine
- Provenance: Exeter Book
- Genre: Elegy
- Verse form: Alliterative verse
- Length: c. 115 lines
- Personages: The narrator of the "wise man"'s speech, and the "wise man", presumably the "Wanderer" himself.
- Text: The Wanderer at Wikisource

The Wanderer is an Old English poem preserved only in an anthology known as the Exeter Book. It comprises 115 lines of alliterative verse. As is often the case with Anglo-Saxon verse, the composer and compiler are anonymous, and within the manuscript the poem is untitled.

== Origins ==
The date of the poem is impossible to determine, but scholarly consensus considers it to be older than the Exeter Book itself, which dates from the late 10th century. The inclusion of a number of Norse-influenced words, such as the compound hrimceald (ice-cold, from the Old Norse word hrimkaldr), and some unusual spelling forms, has encouraged others to date the poem to the late 9th or early 10th century.

As is typical of Old English verse, the metre of the poem is alliterative and consists of four-stress lines, divided between the second and third stresses by a caesura. Each caesura is indicated in the manuscript by a subtle increase in character spacing and with full stops, but modern print editions render them in a more obvious fashion. It is considered an example of an Anglo-Saxon elegy.

== Contents ==
The Wanderer conveys the meditations of a solitary exile on his past happiness as a member of his lord's band of retainers, his present hardships and the values of forbearance and faith in the heavenly Lord. The warrior is identified as eardstapa (line 6a), usually translated as "wanderer" (from eard meaning "earth" or "land", and steppan, meaning "to step"), who roams the cold seas and walks "paths of exile" (wræclastas). He remembers the days when, as a young man, he served his lord, feasted together with comrades, and received precious gifts from the lord. Yet fate (wyrd) turned against him when he lost his lord, kinsmen and comrades in battle—they were defending their homeland against an attack—and he was driven into exile. Some readings of the poem see the wanderer as progressing through three phases; first as the ānhaga (solitary man) who dwells on the deaths of other warriors and the funeral of his lord, then as the mōdcearig man (man sorrowful of heart) who meditates on past hardships and on the fact that mass killings have been innumerable in history, and finally as the snottor on mōde (man wise in mind) who has come to understand that life is full of hardships, impermanence, and suffering, and that stability only resides with God. Other readings accept the general statement that the exile does come to understand human history, his own included, in philosophical terms, but would point out that the poem has elements in common with "The Battle of Maldon", a poem about a battle in which an Anglo-Saxon troop was defeated by Viking invaders.

However, the speaker reflects upon life while spending years in exile, and to some extent has gone beyond his personal sorrow. In this respect, the poem displays some of the characteristics of Old English wisdom poetry. The degeneration of “earthly glory” is presented as inevitable in the poem, contrasting with the theme of salvation through faith in God.

The wanderer vividly describes his loneliness and yearning for the bright days past, and concludes with an admonition to put faith in God, "in whom all stability dwells".

== Interpretation ==
=== Critical history ===
The development of critical approaches to The Wanderer corresponds closely to changing historical trends in European and Anglo-American philology, literary theory, and historiography as a whole.

Like other works in Old English, The Wanderer would not have been understood between the twelfth and sixteenth centuries because of the rapid changes in the English language after the Norman Conquest. Until the early nineteenth century, the existence of the poem was largely unknown outside of Exeter Cathedral's library. In John Josias Conybeare's 1826 compilation of Anglo-Saxon poetry, The Wanderer was erroneously treated as part of the preceding poem Juliana. It was not until 1842 that it was identified as a separate work, in its first print edition, by the pioneering Anglo-Saxonist Benjamin Thorpe. Thorpe considered it to bear "considerable evidence of originality", but regretted an absence of information on its historical and mythological context. His decision to name it The Wanderer has not always been met with approval. J. R. R. Tolkien, who adopted the poem's ubi sunt passage (lines 92–96) into The Lord of the Rings for his Lament for the Rohirrim, was one of the scholars who expressed dissatisfaction. As early as 1926–27 Tolkien was considering the alternative titles "An Exile", or "Alone the Banished Man", and by 1964–65 was arguing for "The Exile's Lament". Despite such pressure, the poem is generally referred to under Thorpe's original title.

=== Themes and motifs ===
Critics have identified the presence in The Wanderer of a number of themes and formal elements common to the Old English elegies, including the "beasts of battle" motif; the ubi sunt formula; the exile theme, also seen in The Seafarer, Beowulf and "The Death of Edward"; the ruin theme; and the journey motif, also seen in The Seafarer.

The "beasts of battle" motif, often found in Anglo-Saxon heroic poetry, is here modified to include not only the standard eagle, raven, and wolf, but also a "sad-faced man" (sumne drēorighlēor, l. 83). It has been suggested that this is the poem's protagonist.

The ubi sunt or "where is/where are they" formula is present in lines 92–93, in the form hwær cwom ("where has ___ gone"):

Hwǣr cwōm mearg? Hwǣr cwōm mago? Hwǣr cwōm māþþumgyfa?
Hwǣr cwōm symbla gesetu? Hwǣr sindon seledrēamas?

[Where have the horses gone? where are the riders? where is the giver of gold?
Where are the seats of the feast? where are the joys of the hall?]

— Translated by R. M. Liuzza (2014)

The motific use of this phrase emphasises the sense of loss that pervades the poem.

It has been argued that the concluding admonition is a later addition, as it lies at the end of a poem that some would say is otherwise entirely secular in its concerns. Opponents of this interpretation such as I. L. Gordon have argued that because many of the words in the main body of the poem have both secular and religious meanings, it is not necessarily the case that the poem's explicitly religious conclusion represents a later addition.

In "The Wanderer's Courage" (2005), L. Beaston describes the psychological or spiritual progress of the wanderer as an "act of courage of one sitting alone in meditation", who through embracing the values of Christianity seeks "a meaning beyond the temporary and transitory meaning of earthly values".

Harriet Soper has argued that there is a close verbal and thematic correspondence between the poem and Psalm 39 (Psalm 38 in the Latin Vulgate numbering), either through direct influence or via earlier Old English poetry.

=== Speech boundaries ===
A plurality of scholarly opinion holds that the main body of the poem is spoken as monologue, bound between a prologue and epilogue voiced by the poet. For example, lines 1–5, or 1–7, and 111–115 can be considered the words of the poet as they refer to the wanderer in the third person, and lines 8–110 as those of a singular individual in the first person. Alternatively, the entire piece can be seen as a soliloquy spoken by a single speaker. Due to the disparity between the anxiety of the "wanderer" (ānhaga) in the first half and the contentment of the "wise one" (snottor) in the second half, others have interpreted it as a dialogue between two distinct personas, framed within the first person prologue and epilogue. An alternative approach grounded in post-structuralist literary theory, and posited by Carol Braun Pasternack identifies a polyphonic series of different speaking positions determined by the subject that the speaker will address.

== Influence and adaptations ==
- W. H. Auden's The Wanderer is inspired by the Old English poem.
- J. R. R. Tolkien adapted the Ubi sunt? passage from The Wanderer for his elegiac Lament of the Rohirrim, an instance of his use of poetry within his prose, in his fantasy novel The Lord of the Rings.
- Seamus Heaney's The Wanderer alludes to the poem.
- Ken Smith's poem Fox Running closes with the words 'a wise man holds out', alluding to The Wanderer lines 65ff.
- The Vancouver poet Jon Furberg's Anhaga 'grew out of an abandoned attempt to translate The Wanderer'.
- Bruce Gorrie, 'The Wanderer', Agenda, 35 (1997), 54–57 (translation into Glasgow dialect).
- The American music group Chanticleer and the organization Chicago a cappella commissioned an adaptation of The Wanderer for a cappella voices in 2005 by composer Ezequiel Viñao.
- The comedian Stewart Lee incorporated a quotation of lines 6–7 into a sketch in his 2014 BBC TV series Comedy Vehicle; the quotation was then sampled by Asian Dub Foundation on the track 'Comin' Over Here' on their album Access Denied.

== See also ==
- Deor
- The Ruin
- The Seafarer
