= Carol Braun Pasternack =

American literary historian (1950–2020)

- Born: 1950
- Died: September 2, 2020 (aged 70); Santa Barbara, California

Academic background
- Education: University of California, Los Angeles

Academic work
- Discipline: Medieval English Literature and Language
- Notable works: The Textuality of Old English Poetry

Carol Braun Pasternack (1950 – September 2, 2020) was a professor of medieval English literature and language at the University of California, Santa Barbara (UCSB) from 1988 to 2013. She chaired the Medieval Studies department, and was also Dean of Summer Sessions at UCSB in 2011–2013.

== Education ==
Pasternack received her PhD from the University of California, Los Angeles, in 1983.

== Research ==
Her research interests included history of the English language, Old and Middle English literature, theories concerning oral tradition (especially the techniques of scops or oral poets) and textual transmission of early medieval texts, feminist approaches to medieval literature, and sex and gender in the early Middle Ages.

Her first monograph was The Textuality of Old English Poetry, published by Cambridge University Press in 1995. In The Textuality of Old English Poetry, Pasternack argued for the techniques of transmission of oral and textual poetry: "In a primary oral culture, to solve effectively the problem of retaining and retrieving carefully articulated thought, you have to do your thinking in mnemonic patterns, shaped for ready oral recurrence." (p. 62), and "Whenever scribes who are part of the oral traditional culture write or copy traditional oral works, they do not merely mechanically hand them down; they rehear them, 'mouth' them, 'reperform' them in the act of writing in such a way that the text may change but remain authentic, just as a completely oral poet's text changes from performance to performance without losing authenticity" (p. 27). Rosamund S. Allen, writing in the Modern Language Review in 1997 praised Pasternack for "establishing new ways of reading Old English [...] reject[ing] the 'New Critical' mode of treating Old English poems like modern written texts, with definable boundaries and an identifiable author. Bridging the divide between oral and written texts that seems to invest much recent discussion, Pasternack instead invites readers to consider these both as inscribed texts and recordings of previously performed verse, which present aural rather than visual cues".

== Publications ==
- Pasternack, Carol Braun (1995). The Textuality of Old English Poetry. Cambridge University Press. ISBN 0-521-46549-4. OCLC 31044751.
- "Stylistic Disjunctions in The Dream of the Rood", Anglo-Saxon England 1984 volume 13, 167–186.
- Her article "Anonymous polyphony and The Wanderer's textuality" was published in the journal Anglo-Saxon England, Volume 20 (December 1991) 99-122. Writing in Neophilologus journal, Ronald J. Ganze identifies Pasternack's major intervention being that she "posits a polyphony of voices rather than the traditional one or two speakers" for the Old English Wanderer poem.
- Pasternack's chapter "PostStructuralist Theories: The Subject and the Text" features in Reading Old English Texts (1997) edited by Katherine O'Brien O'Keeffe and published by Cambridge University Press. Greg Waite reviewed the book for Parergon journal, and noted that Pasternack's article "ranges over Derrida, Lacan, Barthes, Kristeva, Foucault and others before moving into a brief post-structuralist reading of Beowulf".
- Pasternack, C. B. (2003). Negotiating Gender in Anglo-Saxon England. MEDIEVAL CULTURES, 32, 107-144.

=== Co-editor ===
- With A. N. Doane (1991) Vox intexta: Orality and Textuality in the Middle Ages
- With Sharon Farmer (2003) Gender and Difference in the Middle Ages
- With Lisa C. M. Weston (2004) Sex and Sexuality in Anglo-Saxon England: Essays in Memory of Daniel Gilmore Calder

Mary Dockray-Miller notes that Pasternack and Weston's edited collection is "the only essay collection focused exclusively on issues of sexuality and gender in pre- Conquest England [...] an enormously useful and comprehensive overview of the history of sexuality studies in general, in medieval scholarship more particularly, and in Anglo-Saxon studies most specifically."

== Personal life ==
Pasternack died on September 2, 2020, at the age of 70, due to brain cancer. She was working on the book Sex, Text, and Power in Anglo-Saxon England.
