= John Niles (scholar) =

American scholar (born 1945)

John D. Niles (born 1945) is an American scholar of medieval English literature best known for his work on Beowulf and the theory of oral literature.

== Career ==
A graduate of the University of California, Berkeley, where he received his higher degrees (BA in English, 1967; PhD in Comparative Literature, 1972), Niles taught for an initial four years as Assistant Professor of English at Brandeis University. He then was invited to join the faculty of the Department of English at the University of California, Berkeley, where he remained for 26 years until taking early retirement. In 2001, he joined the faculty of the University of Wisconsin–Madison, where he taught for 10 years in the Department of English, was named the Frederic G. Cassidy Professor of Humanities, and was a Senior Fellow at the UW Institute for the Humanities. After his retirement from UW-Madison in 2011, he has remained active in research as Professor Emeritus at both UC Berkeley and UW-Madison.

Niles is the author of nine books on Old English literature and related topics. He has edited or co-edited another eight books, in addition to upwards of sixty scholarly articles and other publications. His first book, Beowulf: The Poem and Its Tradition (1983), ascribes the poem's strengths to its grounding in Germanic heroic legend and the oral traditions of alliterative verse cultivated in early medieval England.

During the 1980s, he conducted fieldwork into singing and storytelling traditions in Scotland, particularly among Scottish Traveller groups, including the noted storyteller Duncan Williamson. This research led first to his book Homo Narrans: The Poetics and Anthropology of Oral Literature (1997) which argues for storytelling as a defining characteristic of the human species, and later to his book Webspinner: Songs, Stories and Reflections of Duncan Williamson, Scottish Traveller (2022), a portrait of a single gifted tradition-bearer. In 2005, he taught a seminar at the Newberry Library, Chicago, on the early history of Old English studies. This became the kernel of his 2015 book The Idea of Anglo-Saxon England 1066-1901, a sustained account of the evolution of the study of Old English literature, the Old English language, and the Anglo-Saxons from the early Middle Ages to the death of Queen Victoria in 1901; and to his book Old English Literature: A Guide to Criticism (2016), which carries the literary side of the investigation into the twenty-first century.

His researches into the archaeology and prehistory of early Northwest Europe led to the jointly-authored publication Beowulf and Lejre (2007), which centers on the prehistoric Danish site at the present-day hamlet of Lejre, Zealand, where much of the imagined action of the Old English poem Beowulf is set. Niles argues that the origins of the Beowulf story can be traced to the topography and legends associated with this monumental landscape.

His 2019 book God’s Exiles and English Verse: On the Exeter Anthology of Old English Poetry is the first integrative book-length critical study of the earliest anthology of English-language poetry, the Exeter Book, a late-tenth-century collection that includes such Old English poems as The Wanderer and The Seafarer. Niles argues for the structural and thematic coherence of this anthology as a product of the late-tenth-century English Benedictine Reform.

Klaeber's Beowulf, 4th edition (2008), which Niles co-edited with Robert Fulk and Robert E. Bjork, has been called "a triumph for a triumverate." Medical Writings from Early Medieval England, Volume I (2023), co-edited with Maria A. D'Aronco, has been characterized as "nothing short of a monumental feat."

In 2022, Niles was the honorand of a collection of articles, first published as a special issue of the journal Humanities, and subsequently as the book Old English Poetry and Its Legacy.

== Selected publications ==
=== Monographs ===
- Beowulf: The Poem and Its Tradition (Harvard University Press, 1983). ISBN 0-674-06725-8.
- Homo Narrans: The Poetics and Anthropology of Oral Literature (University of Pennsylvania Press, 1999). ISBN 0-8122-3504-5,
- Old English Enigmatic Poems and the Play of the Texts (Brepols, 2006). ISBN 2-503-51530-4.
- Old English Heroic Poems and the Social Life of Texts (Brepols, 2007). ISBN 978-2-503-52080-3.
- Beowulf and Lejre (Arizona Center for Medieval and Renaissance Studies, 2007) - with Tom Christensen and Marijane Osborn. ISBN 978-0-86698-368-6.
- The Idea of Anglo-Saxon England 1066-1901: Remembering, Forgetting, Deciphering, and Renewing the Past (Wiley-Blackwell, 2015). ISBN 978-1-118-94332-8.
- Old English Literature: A Guide to Criticism with Selected Readings (Wiley-Blackwell, 2016). ISBN 978-0-631-22056-5.
- God’s Exiles and English Verse: On the Exeter Anthology of Old English Poetry (University of Exeter Press, 2019). ISBN 978-1-905816-09-5.
- Webspinner: Songs, Stories and Reflections of Duncan Williamson, Scottish Traveller (University Press of Mississippi, 2022). ISBN 978-1-4968-4158-2

=== Edited collections ===
- Old English Literature in Context: Ten Essays (Boydell and Brewer, 1980). ISBN 0-8476-6770-7.
- A Beowulf Handbook (University of Nebraska Press, 1997) - with Robert E. Bjork. ISBN 0-8032-1237-2.
- Anglo-Saxonism and the Construction of Social Identity (University Press of Florida, 1997) - with Allen J. Frantzen. ISBN 0-8130-1532-4.
- Beowulf: An Illustrated Edition, featuring Seamus Heaney's translation of the poem (W.W. Norton, 2007). ISBN 978-0-393-33010-6.
- Klaeber’s Beowulf, 4th edition (University of Toronto Press, 2008) - with R.D. Fulk and Robert E. Bjork. ISBN 978-0-8020-9843-6.
- The Genesis of Books: Studies in the Scribal Culture of Medieval England in Honour of A.N. Doane (Brepols, 2011) - with Matthew T. Hussey. ISBN 978-2-503-53473-2.
- Anglo-Saxon England and the Visual Imagination (Arizona Center for Medieval and Renaissance Studies, 2016) - with Stacy S. Klein and Jonathan Wilcox. ISBN 978-0-86698-512-3.
- Medical Writings from Early Medieval England, Volume I: The Old English Herbal, Lacnunga, and Other Texts, Dumbarton Oaks Medieval Library 81 (Harvard University Press, 2023) - with Maria A. D'Aronco. ISBN 978-0-674-29082-2.
