= Paul Keenan (composer) =

British composer

Paul Keenan (1 August 1956 – 26 June 2001) was a British 20th Century contemporary classical composer. His body of composition spans 27 years, though consistently explores his fascination with both Anglo-Saxon texts (from The Exeter Book) and the natural world.

== Education ==
Keenan was born in Birmingham where he attended St Philip's Grammar School. He went on to study composition with Anthony Gilbert at the Royal Northern College of Music. He enrolled at Durham University in 1979 to read for a Master of Arts degree, but eventually left without submitting a thesis after struggling with writer's block.

In 1992, he returned to education (the decision to leave Durham having 'plagued him' for some time) and began doctoral studies at the University of Edinburgh. In 1999 he was awarded a PhD in Composition from Edinburgh, supervised by Nigel Osborne and Peter Nelson. Keenan also studied privately with Bill Hopkins.

== Notable works ==
- Concerto for Groups of Instruments (1974–76)

1(picc).alto fl.1.1.1–1.2.2.1–pno.organ–7.3.3.1

- The Ruin (part one) (1976–79)

Setting of part of The Ruin, an Anglo-Saxon poem from The Exeter Book
soprano, counter-tenor, 1.1.1.0-1.1.1.0-pno/cel.hpsch/org-2 perc–string quartet

- Palimpsest (1992–95)

Setting of riddles from The Exeter Book
soprano, 0.1.1.0–0.0.1.0–pno–perc–string quartet–tape and live electronics

- Squaring xlvii (1996–97)

Setting of poem by Seamus Heaney from Seeing Things
soprano, alto/tenor-bass trombone, percussion, tape and live electronics

- Comet Hale-Bopp (1997–98)

for 43 musicians in 3 groups, and tape electronics

1. oboe, clarinet, tenor trombone, 6 violoncelli, 4 double-basses (bass 1 & 4 scordatura tuning)
2. 3 flutes (3rd doubling piccolo), 2 alto flutes, bass flute, cor anglais, 2 horns, 7 violins, 6 violas (tuned down 1/4 tone)
3. piano, 2 harps (1/4 tone tuning), 5 percussionists: vibraphone, 2 glockenspiels, marimba, chromatic crotales, 2 hand-held crotales, 6 gongs, 6 tam-tams, claves, small Balinese gong, medium Chinese gong, bass drum, tongue drum (8 slots), maracas, small bell

- A Field of Scarecrows (trombone and piano) (1998)
- I quattro libri dell'architettura (for string quartet and tape electronics) (1999–2000)

== Awards ==
Keenan's Concerto for Groups of Instruments won the 1977 Royal Philharmonic Society Composition Prize. Music of Wood and Strings was awarded the 1978 Worshipful Company of Musicians Silver Medal.

Cloudscapes, Palimpsest and Comet Hale-Bopp were all shortlisted by the Society for the Promotion of New Music (now Sound and Music).

== Further information ==
Since his death in 2001, Keenan's work has received numerous broadcasts on BBC Radio 3 Hear and Now, featuring performances by orchestras and ensembles such as the BBC Scottish Symphony Orchestra and ECAT. In 1998, a television documentary about Keenan was created by Peter Chapman for broadcast on ITV Border Television.

A select group of academics, composers and performers believe Keenan's music to be a unique and significant contribution to music of the late 20th Century. His pioneering approach to electro-acoustic composition and research into sound phenomenon earned him the description as "the man who split music's atom".
