= The Panther (Old English poem) =

Old English poem

The Panther is a 74-line alliterative poem written in the Old English language which uses the image of a panther as an allegory for Christ's death and Resurrection. It is believed to be part of a cycle of three animal-based poems called the Old English Physiologus or Bestiary, a translation-adaptation of the popular Physiologus text found in many European literatures, preserved in the Exeter Book anthology of Old English poetry. Being the first of three poems in the cycle, The Panther is followed by the poems The Whale and The Partridge.

== Plot ==
The poem concerns a panther who exhibits a special behaviour (sundorgecyn(e)d - a hapax legomenon compound noun from sundor- and gecynd, frequently glossed as referring to the panther's unique nature (e.g. as 'a peculiar nature' in Bosworth-Toller)). The Panther feasts on his fodder, then seeks rest in a mountain glen for the length of three days, sleeping;

Symle fylle fægen, þonne foddor þigeð,
æfter þam gereordum ræste seceð
dygle stowe under dunscrafum;
ðær se þeodwiga þreonihta fæc
swifeð on swefote, slæpe gebiesgad.

[Always desiring repletion,
when it takes its meals—
after its feasting it seeks (35-36)
its rest in a secret place
within an earthen cave—
there the mighty fighter (36b-38a)
for three nights’ space
wends into slumber,
occupied by sleep. (38b-39)]

When on the third day the Panther awakens, it begins to sing, letting out a pleasant fragrance;

þonne ellenrof up astondeð
þrymme gewelgad, on þone þriddan dæg
sneome of slæpe. Sweghleoþor cymeð,
woþa wysumast þurh þæs wildres muð.
æfter þære stefne stenc ut cymeð
of þam wongstede, wynsumra steam

[Then the bravery-bold rises up again
bolstered in its majesty,
on the third day, (40-41)
swiftly from sleep.
Melodious sound emerges,
the most winsome of cries (42-43a)
through that wild beast’s mouth—
and after that voice
a scent comes forth (43b-44)
from that hollow,
a pleasant emanation]

The pleasant fragrance attracts many throngs of men (beornþreat monig) who flock to the source of the fragrance and song (æfter þære stefne and on þone stenc).

== Themes ==
The Panther's retreat and return after three nights mirrors the story of the death and resurrection of Jesus. The poem uses similar language and imagery to homiletic writings.

The word stenc (cf. Modern English stench, stink), used in The Panther to describe the fragrance the Panther exudes whilst singing, is used elsewhere in the Old English corpus as a symbol of holiness and is a key theme of the poem. The half-line þæt is æþele stenc ('that is a noble fragrance') is the last half-line of the poem, summarising the quotation attributed to St. Paul in the concluding passage of the poem;

Monigfealde sind geond middangeard
god ungnyðe þe us to giefe dæleð
ond to feorhnere fæder ælmihtig,
ond se anga hyht ealra gesceafta,
uppe ge niþre." þæt is æþele stenc.

[“There are many across middle-earth
gracious with their goods (69-71a)
which the Almighty Father
shares with us in gift and salvation
and that is the solitary hope (71b-73a)
of all creation
above and below.”
That is a noble scent! (73b-74)]

== Editions & Translations ==
- Old English Poetry in Facsimile project Digital edition and translation of The Panther using facsimile manuscript images, with editorial notes; Foys, Martin, et al., eds. (Center for the History of Print and Digital Culture, University of Wisconsin-Madison, 2019-) (Edition and translation.)
