= Pharaoh (Old English poem) =

Old English poem

"Pharaoh" is the editorial name given to a fragmentary, eight-line Old English poem on folio 122r of the later tenth-century anthology known as the Exeter Book.

== Genre ==
Critical discussion has focused on the genre of the poem. It is preserved in a collection which also contains the Exeter Book Riddles, but is not technically a riddle in form, but rather a dialogic question about arcane wisdom, and is not traditionally counted among the riddles themselves. Other question-and-answer texts in Old English include the much longer Solomon and Saturn.

The poem bears a certain affinity to one version of the Ioca monachorum, in which the question is posed how many the Egyptians were who pursued the Israelites, and the answer (1,800) depends on one knowing that there were 600 chariots (Ex. 14.7) and three men in each (according to the canticles in the Roman Psalter). One of the two damaged places in the text, Trahern suggests, may actually have provided the reader with the ability to divine the correct answer by referring to three-man chariots.

== Text ==
As edited in the Anglo-Saxon Poetic Records series, the poem reads:

"Saga me hwæt þær weorudes wære ealles
on Farones fyrde, þa hy folc godes
þurh feondscipe fylgan ongunn...."
"Nat ic hit be wihte, butan ic wene þus,
þæt þær screoda wære gescyred rime
siex hun... ...a searohæbbendra;
þæt eal fornam yþ...
wraþe wyrde in woruldrice."

As translated by Patrick J. Murphy, this reads:

"Tell me how many troops in Pharaoh's army there were in all, when they in enmity began to pursue God's people.' 'I do not know anything about it, except that I think there was the number of six hundred armed chariots, which the tumult of the waves swept away; it fiercely destroyed it in the kingdom of the earth."
