= The Fortunes of Men =

Old English poem

"The Fortunes of Men", also "The Fates of Men" or "The Fates of Mortals", is the title given to an Old English gnomic poem of 98 lines in the Exeter Book, fols. 87a–88b.

== Summary ==
Having first referred to a child's coming of age, the poem describes a number of (particularly fatal) misfortunes which may then befall one: a youth's premature death, famine, warfare and infirmity, the deprivations of a traveller, death at the gallows or on the pyre and self-destructive behaviour through intemperate drinking. However, a man of mature age may also prosper in terms of his material wealth and friends, and achieve happiness. The poet explains that the distribution of man's fortunes and misfortunes is in God's hands, including that of one's skills and talents: martial dexterity (throwing and shooting), cunning at board-games, scholarly wisdom and the craft of a goldsmith. The same applies to one's success or skills in cheering one's drinking fellows or in singing and plucking the harp, while sitting at the feet of one's lord. The last image drawn from Anglo-Saxon life is that of taming the hawk. Apart from underpinning the vast array of skills made available to men, it may also be intended to serve as an analogy to the opening image of the child clothed, reared and disciplined by his parents. In conclusion, the poem praises God's supreme skill in measuring out and managing the many and various destinies of men and urges its audience to express gratitude to the benevolent Ruler.

== Bibliography ==
Editions and translations

- Foys, Martin et al. (ed.) (2019-) Old English Poetry in Facsimile Project, Madison: Center for the History of Print and Digital Culture, University of Wisconsin-Madison; edited with digital images of its manuscript pages, and translated.
- Muir, B. J. (ed.) (1994) The Exeter Anthology of Old English Poetry: an edition of Exeter Dean and Chapter MS 3501. 2 vols. Exeter: University of Exeter Press.
- Shippey, T. A. (ed. and tr.) (1976) Poems of Wisdom and Learning in Old English. Cambridge: D. S. Brewer; pp. 58–63.
- Krapp, G. P., and Dobbie, E. V. K. (eds.) (1936) The Exeter Book. (The Anglo-Saxon Poetic Records; 3.) New York: Columbia U. P.
- Bradley, S. A. J. (tr.) (1982) Anglo-Saxon Poetry: an anthology of Old English poems in prose translation. London: Dent; pp. 341–43.

Secondary literature

- Dammers, R. H. (1976) "Unity and Artistry in The Fortunes of Men" in: American Benedictine Review; 27 (1976); pp. 461–69.
- Drout, Michael D. C. (1998) "The Fortunes of Men 4a: reasons for adopting a very old emendation" in: Modern Philology 96.2 (1998); pp. 184–7.
- Magennis, Hugh (1996) Images of Community in Old English Poetry. Cambridge: Cambridge University Press
- Swenson, K. (1991) "Death Appropriated in The Fates of Men" in: Studies in Philology 88 (1991); pp. 123–35.
