= Bill Hopkins (composer) =

British composer

- Born: George William Hopkins; 5 June 1943
- Died: 10 March 1981 (aged 37)
- Era: 20th сentury

George William Hopkins (5 June 1943 – 10 March 1981), known as Bill Hopkins, was a British composer. He also published music criticism, mostly under the name G. W. Hopkins.

== Biography ==
Hopkins was born in Prestbury, Cheshire, and educated at Hillcrest Grammar School and Rossall School, Lancashire; his mother's disability meant she was unable to look after him, and he was raised by aunts. Studies with Luigi Nono at Dartington Summer School consolidated his interest in serialism; subsequently he studied at Oxford University with Edmund Rubbra and Egon Wellesz.

In 1964 he went to Paris in order to study with Olivier Messiaen, and with an ambition to meet Jean Barraqué. Returning to England, he supported himself as a music critic in London and then, after moving first to Tintagel, Cornwall and subsequently to Peel, Isle of Man, by translation and writing music criticism. He married Clare Gilbert in 1972. Subsequently, he taught at Birmingham University and University of Newcastle upon Tyne before succumbing to a heart attack, in Chopwell, near Newcastle, at the age of 37.

His few pupils included the British composers Paul Keenan and Patrick Ozzard-Low.

== Career ==
Hopkins' music is published by Universal Edition, Schott, and Ricordi. It has been performed by Irvine Arditti, David Atherton, Alexander Balanescu, Richard Bernas, Nicolas Hodges, Geoffrey Douglas Madge, Jane Manning, Holly Mathieson, Donatienne Michel-Dansac, Christopher Rowland, Sarah Maria Sun, Ilan Volkov and Alison Wells, as well as ensemble recherche, London Sinfonietta, BBC Symphony Orchestra, Music Projects/London, Christchurch Symphony Orchestra and the WDR Symphony Orchestra.

== Works ==
This listing is of Hopkins' completed and acknowledged works. For further information about other works, see Paul Griffiths' provisional catalogue.

- Sous-structures. Solo piano. 1964, first performed 1965 (publ. Universal Edition, UE17700)
- Two Pomes (James Joyce). Soprano, bass clarinet, trumpet, harp, viola. 1964, first performed 1968 (publ. Universal Edition, UE14204)
- Musique de l'indifférence, Ballet after Samuel Beckett. Orchestra, 1964–65, first performed 2019 (publ. Ricordi) Nkoda
- Sensation (Rimbaud, Beckett). Soprano, tenor sax, trumpet, harp, viola. 1965, first performed 1965. (publ. Schott)
- Etudes en série. Solo piano. 1965–72, first complete performance 1997. (publ. Schott)
- Pendant. Solo violin. 1969, rev 1973, first performed 1975. (publ. Universal Edition, UE17943)
- Nouvelle etude hors série. Solo organ. 1974, first performed 1993. (publ. Universal Edition, UE17303)
- Lindaraja by Claude Debussy, orchestrated by Hopkins. Orchestra. 1975, first performed 2019. (publ. Universal Edition, UE18459)
- En attendant. Flute, oboe, cello, harpsichord. 1976–77, first performed 1977. (publ. Schott)

The Bill Hopkins Collection at the Paul Sacher Foundation, Basel, holds Hopkins' manuscripts.

== Recordings ==
His complete piano works have been recorded by Nicolas Hodges, (col legno, 2000). En Attendant, Two Pomes, Pendant and Sensation have been recorded by Music Projects/London and Richard Bernas, (NMC, 1992).

A new complete recording of his acknowledged works is in preparation.

== Bibliography ==
- Anon, "Musique Contemporaine à l'American Center", Le Monde, 4 December 1965. [Review of premiere of Sensation]
- Boivin, Jean, La Classe de Messiaen, (Paris, Christian Bourgois, 1995), pp. 424–5
- Delaere, Mark, "Serialism in Western Europe", in Martin Iddon (ed.)The Cambridge Companion to Serialism, (Cambridge: Cambridge University Press, 2024.) pp. 205–224, esp. pp. 220–221. https://doi.org/10.1017/9781108592116
- Gilbert, Anthony, Programme note for New mcnaghten Concerts (Sensation/Two Pomes/Pendant) (1985)
- Gilbert, Anthony, 'Bill Hopkins', sleeve note for NMC D014 (1993)
- Griffiths, Paul, "Bill Hopkins: A Provisional Catalogue of Compositions and Writings", Musical Times cxxii (1981), 600
- Griffiths, Paul, Letter to the Editor, Tempo no.187 (1993)
- Griffiths, Paul, Modern Music and After (Oxford: Oxford University Press, 1995), 233–5
- Griffiths, Paul, "Hopkins, Bill", in Sadie, Stanley (ed.) The New Grove Dictionary of Music & Musicians, Second Edition (2001), Vol. 11, pp. 698–9
- Hodges, Nicolas, "The Music of Bill Hopkins: A Preliminary Approach", Tempo No. 186, September 1993
- Hodges, Nicolas, 'Bill Hopkins's Orchestration of Debussy's "Lindaraja"', Tempo No. 201 (1997), pp. 28–31
- Hodges, Nicolas, 'Nono – Goehr – Barraqué: Threads of Influence in the Early Work of Bill Hopkins', Mitteilungen der Paul Sacher Stiftung, Nr. 38, Mai 2025, 25–31
- Metzger, Heinz-Klaus, 'Unvollendete Komponisten', 18. Musik-Biennale Berlin [programme book], pp. 10–14 (esp. p. 14)
- Müller, David Florian, 'Bill Hopkins' Sous-structures - Varietas und Zusammenhang im seriellen Kontext', Wolke Verlag Hofheim 2023
- Nyffeler, Max, 'Zu spät gekommen, zu früh gegangen: Bill Hopkins – eine entdeckung', Neue Zeitschrift für Musik, Heft 1/2001 (January/February)
- Schiffer, Brigitte, 'London - Der Nachwuchs beschreitet traditionelle Wege', Melos 1975/III, pp. 214–216 (Hopkins' Pendant reviewed on p. 214)
