= The Death of Alfred =

English poem

The Death of Alfred is an Old English poem that is part of the Anglo-Saxon Chronicle, concerning the killing of Alfred Aetheling in 1036. It is noted for its departure from traditional Old English poetic metre, abandoning the alliterative verse form in favour of fairly consistently rhyming hemistichs.

== Context ==
The poem occurs as part of the entry for 1036 in manuscripts C and D of the Chronicle, which begins in prose:

Her com Ælfred, se unsceððiga æþeling, Æþelrædes sunu cinges, hider inn and wolde to his meder, þe on Wincestre sæt, ac hit him ne geþafode Godwine eorl, ne ec oþre men þe mycel mihton wealdan, forðan hit hleoðrode þa swiðe toward Haraldes, þeh hit unriht wære. In this year, Ælfred, the innocent prince, son of King Æthelræd, came here, and desired to travel to his mother, who was in residence in Winchester. But neither Earl Godwin nor other people wielding great power allowed him, because things spoke much more towards Harald, although it was unjust.

== Text, translation, and scansion ==
Old English original	Translation	Scansion
Ac Godwine hine þa gelette and hine on hæft sette, and his geferan he todraf, and sume mislice ofsloh; sume hi man wið feo sealde, sume hreowlice acwealde, sume hi man bende, sume hi man blende, sume hamelode, sume hættode. Ne wearð dreorlicre dæd gedon on þison earde, syþþan Dene comon and her frið namon. Nu is to gelyfenne to ðan leofan gode, þæt hi blission bliðe mid Criste þe wæron butan scylde swa earmlice acwealde. Se æþeling lyfode þa gyt; ælc yfel man him gehet, oðþæt man gerædde þæt man hine lædde to Eligbyrig swa gebundenne. Sona swa he lende, on scype man hine blende, and hine swa blindne brohte to ðam munecon, and he þar wunode ða hwile þe he lyfode. Syððan hine man byrigde, swa him wel gebyrede, ful wurðlice, swa he wyrðe wæs, æt þam westende, þam styple ful gehende, on þam suðportice; seo saul is mid Criste.	But Godwine then hindered him and set him in captivity, and drove off his companions. Variously he slew some, some were given to people for money, some killed roughly, some bound, and some blinded, some hamstrung and some scalped. There was no more miserable deed done in this land since the Danes came and made peace here. It is now that we should believe in the dear God that they rejoice happily with Christ, who were, innocent, so horribly killed. The prince yet lived, each kind of wickedness promised to him, until they counselled that he be led to Ely, bound as he was. As soon as he arrived, they blinded him upon the ship, and brought him thus blind to the monks, and he dwelt there the time that he lived. Afterwards they buried him as was fitting, full honourably, as he was worthy, at the west end, right near the steeple, in the south porch; his soul is with Christ.	(x)SSx/(xxxx)Sx | (xxx)x/SSx (xx)x/SxxxS | (x)xx/SxxxS xx/(xxx)SSx | x/SxxxSx xx/(xx)Sx | xx/(xx)Sx xx/Sxxx | xx/Sxx xx/SxxS | x/SxxxSx xx/SxSx | xx/SSx xx/(xx)Sxx | xx/SxSx xx/Sxx | Sx/(x)Sx (x)xx/(xx)Sx | x/SxxxSx (x)Sxx/SxxxS | SSx/SxxS xx/(xx)Sx | xx/(xx)Sx x/SxSx | xx/Sxx xx/(xx)Sx | (x)Sx/(xxx)Sx (x)xx/(x)Sx Sx/(xx)Sxx xx/(x)Sxx | (x)Sx/(xx)Sxx xx/(xxx)Sxx | xx/SxSxx x/Sxx | xx/SxS xx/SSx | x/SxxxSx xx/SSxx | x/SxxSx

== Recordings ==
- Michael D. C. Drout, 'Death of Alfred', performed from the Anglo-Saxon Poetic Records edition (12 December 2007).

== Digital Facsimile Editions ==
- Foys, Martin and Carsten Haas, Old English Poetry in Facsimile Project, 2019; DOI: 10.21231/t6a2-jt11
