= Exeter Book =

10th-century book of Anglo-Saxon poetry

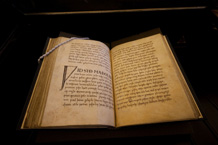
Exeter Book

The Exeter Book, also known as the Codex Exoniensis or Exeter Cathedral Library MS 3501, is a large codex of Old English poetry, believed to have been produced in the late tenth century AD. It is one of the four major manuscripts of Old English poetry, along with the Vercelli Book in the chapter library of Vercelli Cathedral, Italy, the Nowell Codex in the British Library, and the Junius manuscript in the Bodleian Library in Oxford. The Exeter Book was given to what is now the Exeter Cathedral library by Leofric, the first bishop of Exeter, in 1072. It is believed to have originally contained 130 or 131 leaves, of which the first 7 or 8 have been replaced with other leaves; the original first 8 leaves are lost. The Exeter Book is the largest and perhaps oldest known manuscript of Old English literature, containing about a sixth of the Old English poetry that has survived.

In 2016 UNESCO recognized the book as "the foundation volume of English literature, one of the world's principal cultural artefacts".

== History ==
The Exeter Book is generally acknowledged to be one of the great works of the English Benedictine revival of the tenth century; the precise dates that it was written and compiled are unknown, although proposed dates range from 960 to 990. This period saw a rise in monastic activity and productivity under the renewed influence of Benedictine principles and standards. At the opening of the period, Dunstan's importance to the Church and to the English kingdom was established, culminating in his appointment to the Archbishopric at Canterbury under Edgar of England and leading to the monastic reformation by which this era was characterised. Dunstan died in 988, and by the period's close, England under Æthelred faced an increasingly determined Scandinavian incursion, to which it would eventually succumb.

The Exeter Book's heritage becomes traceable from the death of Leofric, bishop of Exeter, in 1072. Among the possessions which he bequeathed in his will to the then-impoverished monastery at Exeter (the precursor to the later cathedral) is one famously described as i mycel Englisc boc be gehwilcum þingum on leoð-wisan geworht: "one large English book on various subjects, composed in verse form". This book has been widely identified by scholars as the Exeter Codex.

However Leofric's bequest was made at least three generations after the book was written, and it has generally been assumed that it had originated elsewhere. According to Patrick Conner, the original scribe who wrote the text probably did not write it as a single volume, but rather three separate manuscript booklets which were later compiled into the Exeter Book codex. There are a number of missing gatherings and pages. Some marginalia were added to the manuscript by the antiquarians Laurence Nowell in the sixteenth century and George Hickes in the seventeenth.

== Contents ==
Aside from eight leaves added to the codex after it was written, the Exeter Book consists entirely of poetry. However, unlike the Junius manuscript, which is dedicated to biblically inspired works, the Exeter Book is noted for the unmatched diversity of genres among its contents, as well as their generally high level of poetic quality.

The poems give a sense of the intellectual sophistication of Anglo-Saxon literary culture. They include numerous saints' lives, gnomic verses, and wisdom poems, in addition to almost a hundred riddles, numerous smaller heroic poems, and a quantity of elegiac verse. The moving elegies and enigmatic riddles are the most famous of the Exeter Book texts. The elegies primarily explore the themes of alienation, loss, the passage of time, desolation, and death, and deal with subjects including the sorrows of exile, the ruination of the past, and the long separation of lovers. Through them we encounter lonely seafarers, banished wanderers, and mournful lovers. The riddles, by contrast, explore the fabric of the world through the prism of the everyday. (See the sections on 'Riddles' and 'Elegies' below.) The Exeter manuscript is also important because it contains two poems signed by the poet Cynewulf, who is one of only twelve Old English poets known to us by name.

According to the Encyclopædia Britannica, "the arrangement of the poems appears to be haphazard, and the book is believed to be copied from an earlier collection". However, whether (or the extent to which) the Exeter Book is a deliberately crafted anthology of related poems or a miscellany of unrelated poems is a matter of debate, as some degree of order has been found in the organisation of its contents.

None of the poems were given a title in the manuscript, and there is often no obvious indicator of where one text ends and the next begins, other than a plain initial. Consequently, the titles given to the poems in the Exeter Book are those that editors have established over the years, and very often a given poem will be known by several titles. The following is one listing of poems found in the book (titles may vary depending on source):

- Christ I, II, III
- Guthlac A and B
- Azarias
- The Phoenix
- Juliana
- The Wanderer
- The Gifts of Men
- Precepts
- The Seafarer
- Vainglory
- Widsith
- The Fortunes of Men
- Maxims I
- The Order of the World
- The Rhyming Poem
- The Panther
- The Whale
- The Partridge
- Soul and Body II
- Deor
- Wulf and Eadwacer
- Riddles 1-57/59
- The Wife's Lament
- The Judgment Day I
- Resignation
- The Descent into Hell
- Alms-Giving
- Pharaoh
- The Lord's Prayer I
- Homiletic Fragment II
- Riddle 28b / 30b
- Riddle 58 / 60
- The Husband's Message
- The Ruin
- Riddles 59-91 / 61-95

== Riddles ==
Among the other texts in the Exeter Book, there are over ninety riddles, written in the conventional alliterative style of Old English poetry. Their topics, which range from the religious to the mundane, are represented in an oblique and elliptical manner, challenging the reader to deduce what they are about. Some of the riddles are double entendres, setting out entirely innocent subject matter in language filled with bawdy connotations, such as Riddle 25 below.

Two Exeter Book riddles are presented below, with Modern English translations alongside the Old English originals. Proposed answers to the riddles are included below the text.

=== Riddle 25 ===
Ic eom wunderlicu wiht · wifum on hyhte
neahbuendum nyt; · nægum sceþþe
burgsittendra nymthe · bonan anum.
Staþol min is steapheah · stonde ic on bedde
neoðan ruh nathwær. · Neþeð hwilum
ful cyrtenu · ceorles dohtor
modwlonc meowle · þæt heo on mec gripe
ræseð mec on reodne · reafath min heafod
fegeð mec on fæsten. · Feleþ sona
mines gemotes · seo þe mec nearwað
wif wundenlocc. · Wæt bið þæt eage.

Translation:

I am a wondrous creature for women in expectation,
a service for neighbours. I harm none of the citizens
except my slayer alone.
My stem is erect, I stand up in bed,
hairy somewhere down below. A very comely
peasant's daughter, dares sometimes,
proud maiden, that she grips at me,
attacks me in my redness, plunders my head,
confines me in a stronghold, feels my
encounter directly,
woman with braided hair. Wet be that eye.

— Riddle 25 (Marsden 2015)

Answer: an onion

=== Riddle 26 ===
Mec feonda sum · feore besnyþede,
woruldstrenga binom, · wætte siþþan,
dyfde on wætre, · dyde eft þonan,
sette on sunnan · þær ic swiþe beleas
herum þam þe ic hæfde. · Heard mec siþþan
snað seaxses ecg, · sindrum begrunden;
fingras feoldan, · ond mec fugles wyn
geond speddropum · spyrede geneahhe,
ofer brunne brerd, · beamtelge swealg,
streames dæle, · stop eft on mec,
siþade sweartlast. · Mec siþþan wrah
hæleð hleobordum, · hyde beþenede,
gierede mec mid golde; · forþon me gliwedon
wrætlic weorc smiþa, · wire bifongen.
Nu þa gereno · ond se reada telg
ond þa wuldorgesteald · wide mære
dryhtfolca helm— · nales dol wite.
Gif min bearn wera · brucan willað,
hy beoð þy gesundran · ond þy sigefæstran,
heortum þy hwætran · ond þy hygebliþran,
ferþe þy frodran, · habbaþ freonda þy ma,
swæsra ond gesibbra, · soþra ond godra,
tilra ond getreowra, · þa hyra tyr ond ead
estum ycað · ond hy arstafum
lissum bilecgað · ond hi lufan fæþmum
fæste clyppað. · Frige hwæt ic hatte,
niþum to nytte. · Nama min is mære,
hæleþum gifre · ond halig sylf.

Translation:

Some fiend robbed me from life,
deprived me of worldly strengths, wetted next,
dipped in water, took out again,
set in the sun, deprived violently
of the hair that I had, · after, the hard
knife's edge cut me, ground from impurities,
fingers folded and a bird's
delight spread useful drops over me,
swallowed tree-ink over the ruddy rim,
portion of liquid, stepped on me again,
travelled with black track. After, a man clad
me with protective boards, covered with hide,
adorned me with gold. Forthwith adorned me
in ornamental works of smiths, encased with wire
Now the trappings and the red dye
and the wondrous setting widely make known
the helm of the lord's folk, never again guard fools.
If children of men want to use me
they will be by that the safer and the more sure of victory
the bolder in heart and the happier in mind,
in spirit the wiser. They will have friends the more
dearer and closer, righteous and more virtuous,
more good and more loyal, those whose glory and happiness
will gladly increase, and them with benefits and kindnesses,
and they of love will clasp tightly with embraces.
Ask what I am called as a service to people.
My name is famous,
bountiful to men and my self holy.

— Riddle 26 (Marsden 2015)

Answer: a Bible

== Elegies ==
The Exeter Book contains the Old English poems known as the "elegies": "The Wanderer" (fol. 76b - fol. 78a); "The Seafarer" (fol. 81b - fol. 83a); "The Riming Poem" fol. 94a - fol. 95b); "Deor" (fol. 100a - fol. 100b), "Wulf and Eadwacer" (fol. 100b - fol. 101a); "The Wife's Lament" (fol. 115a - fol. 115b); "The Husband's Message" (fol. 123a - 123b); and "The Ruin" (fol. 123b - fol. 124b).

The term "elegy" can be confusing due to its application to a diverse range of poems and poetic genres from different cultures and time periods. For example, the Oxford English Dictionary defines elegy (in the poetic sense) as a poem either composed in the elegiac metre of Greek and Roman lyric poets, expressing "personal sentiments on a range of subjects, including epigrams, laments, [and] love", or "a poem in another language based on or influenced by this" – hence, from this latter definition, the application of the term "elegy" to the Old English poems, which are not elegiac in their metre. More broadly, the term "elegy" has also been widened by some to include "any serious meditative poem", a definition which would include the Exeter Book elegies. Providing a synthesis of the strictly metrical definition and the broader definition based on subject matter, Anne Klinck argues in The Old English Elegies that "genre should be conceived [...] as a grouping of literary works based, theoretically, upon both outer form (specific meter or structure) and also upon inner form (attitude, tone, purpose – more crudely, subject and audience)".

== Editions and translations ==
Included here are facsimiles, editions, and translations that include a significant proportion of texts from the Exeter Book.

=== Facsimiles ===
- Chambers, R W; Förster, Max; Flower, Robin (1933). The Exeter Book of Old English Poetry. London: P. Lund, Humphries. OCLC 154109449.
- Online facsimile

=== Editions: Old English text only ===
- Krapp, George Philip; Dobbie, Elliot Van Kirk, eds. (1936). The Exeter Book. The Anglo-Saxon Poetic Records. Vol. III. New York: Columbia University Press. ISBN 0-231-08767-5.
- Muir, Bernard J., ed. (2000). The Exeter Anthology of Old English Poetry: An Edition of Exeter Dean and Chapter MS 3501 (2nd ed.). Exeter: University of Exeter Press. ISBN 0-85989-630-7.

=== Editions: Old English text and translation ===
- Thorpe, Benjamin (1842). Codex Exoniensis: A Collection of Anglo-Saxon Poetry, from a Manuscript in the Library of the Dean and Chapter of Exeter. London: The Society of Antiquaries of London. OCLC 562461120.
- Matto, Michael; Delanty, Greg (2011). The Word Exchange. New York: W. W. Norton & Co. ISBN 978-0393342413. Anthology of Old English poetry, featuring many of the texts from the Exeter Book.
- Gollancz, Israel (1894). The Exeter book. Early English Text Society, Original series, Volume 104, 194.
- Foys, Martin et al. (ed.) (2019-) Old English Poetry in Facsimile Project, Madison: Center for the History of Print and Digital Culture, University of Wisconsin-Madison; edition with digital images of poems' manuscript pages, and translations.

=== Editions: Translations only ===
- Crossley-Holland, Kevin (1982). The Anglo-Saxon World. Oxford: Oxford University Press. ISBN 978-0-19-953871-3. Anthology of Old English poetry and prose, featuring poems from the Exeter Book.
- Crossley-Holland, Kevin (2008). The Exeter Book Riddles. London: Enitharmon Press. ISBN 978-1-904634-46-1. Contains riddles only.
- Williamson, Craig, (2017) The Complete Old English Poems. University of Pennsylvania Press. ISBN 9780812248470.

== See also ==
- Anglo-Saxon literature
- Old English language
