= Wisdom poetry =

Genre of poetry

Literary scholars have identified at least two historical types of poetry as wisdom poetry. The first kind of wisdom poetry was written in ancient Mesopotamia, including the Sumerian Hymn to Enlil, the All-Beneficent. Scholars of medieval literature have also termed some poems "wisdom poetry".

== Origins ==
Sigmund Mowinckel argues that wisdom poetry, encapsulated mainly in sayings or proverbs, was widespread in antiquity. Suggesting that wisdom poems were written in Egypt, Babylonia, and Canaan, Mowinckel identifies the influence of wisdom poetry on the Hebrew psalms. Hermann Gunkel also identifies wisdom poetry (Weisheitsdichtung) as a psalmic genre.

Dan Pagis identifies Samuel ibn Naghrillah as an originator of the wisdom poetry genre.

== Germanic cultures ==
Wisdom poems were a significant aspect of Anglo-Saxon literary culture, written in the Old English language. Scholar Paul Battles identifies wisdom poetry as one of three genres of Anglo-Saxon poetry; the others are elegy and epic. A 1998 anthology of Old English poems describes the genre as a "miscellaneous collection of works whose teaching is partly Christian, partly secular". The editors group riddles, "succinct formulations of traditional wisdom", and "metrical charms" under the wisdom poetry heading.

Carolyne Larrington, whose study A Store of Common Sense compares Old English and Old Icelandic (or Old Norse) wisdom poetry, defines a wisdom poem as one that "exists primarily to impart a body of information about the condition of the world ... or about the past". She describes Maxims I, or Exeter Maxims, as an example of Old English wisdom poetry, and Vafþrúðnismál and Grímnismál as Norse examples.

== Sources ==
- Larrington, Carolyne (1993). A Store of Common Sense: Gnomic Theme and Style in Old Icelandic and Old English Wisdom Poetry. Oxford University Press. ISBN 0-19-811982-8. OCLC 25871539.
- Mowinckel, Sigmund (1962). The Psalms in Israel's Worship. Vol. 1. Translated by Ap-Thomas, D. R. Abingdon Press. ISBN 0-687-34735-1. OCLC 6027773.
- Olsen, Alexandra Hennessey; Raffel, Burton, eds. (1998). Poems and Prose from the Old English. Yale University Press. ISBN 978-0-300-13041-6. OCLC 567922025.
- Pagis, Dan (1991). Hebrew Poetry of the Middle Ages and the Renaissance. University of California Press. ISBN 0-520-06547-6. OCLC 22809128.
