= Vainglory (poem) =

Old English poem

"Vainglory" is the title given to a gnomic or homiletic poem of 84 lines in Old English, preserved in the Exeter Book. The precise date of composition is unknown, but the fact of its preservation in a late 10th-century manuscript provides an approximate terminus ante quem.

The poem is structured around a comparison of two basic opposites of human conduct; on the one hand, the proud man, who "is the devil's child, enwreathed in flesh" (biþ feondes bearn / flæsce bifongen), and, on the other hand, the virtuous man, characterised as "God's own son" (godes agen bearn).

== Editions ==
- Vainglory is included in Foys, Martin, et al., eds. Old English Poetry in Facsimile Project 3.0 (Center for the History of Print and Digital Culture, University of Wisconsin–Madison, 2019-) (with digital facsimile images, annotations and Modern English translation)
