= The Seafarer (poem) =

Old English poem

- by Anonymous
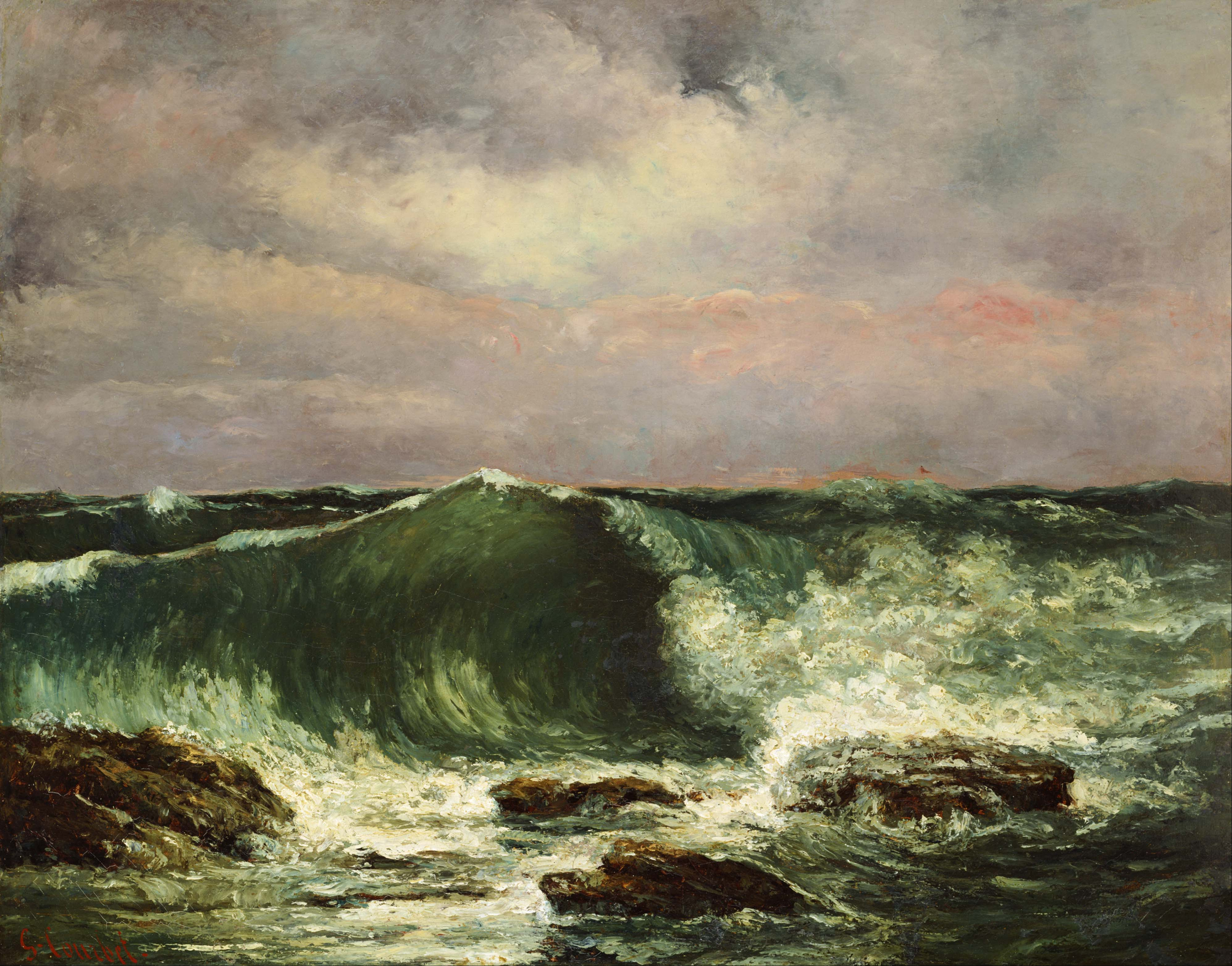
- Gustave Courbet's painting titled Waves and depicting rolling, foamy, sea-green waves crashing on water and rocks.
- Translator: Ezra Pound (1911 adaptation)
- Country: Anglo-Saxon England
- Language: Old English
- Subjects: Exile; mortal hardship; spiritual devotion
- Genre: Old English elegy
- Form: Alliterative verse
- Publication date: c. 975
- Lines: 124

"The Seafarer" is an Old English poem giving a first-person account of a man alone on the sea. The poem consists of 124 lines, followed by the single word "Amen". It is recorded only at folios 81 verso – 83 recto of the tenth-century Exeter Book, one of the four surviving manuscripts of Old English poetry. It has most often, though not always, been categorised as an elegy, a poetic genre commonly assigned to a particular group of Old English poems that reflect on spiritual and earthly melancholy.

== Summary ==
Much scholarship suggests that the poem is told from the point of view of an old seafarer who is reminiscing and evaluating his life as he has lived it. The seafarer describes the desolate hardships of life on the wintry sea. He describes the anxious feelings, cold-wetness, and solitude of the sea voyage in contrast to life on land where men are surrounded by kinsmen, free from dangers, and full on food and wine. The climate on land then begins to resemble that of the wintry sea, and the speaker shifts his tone from the dreariness of the winter voyage and begins to describe his yearning for the sea. Time passes through the seasons from winter—"it snowed from the north"—to spring—"groves assume blossoms"—and to summer—"the cuckoo forebodes, or forewarns".

Then the speaker again shifts, this time not in tone, but in subject matter. The sea is no longer explicitly mentioned; instead the speaker preaches about steering a steadfast path to heaven. He asserts that "earthly happiness will not endure", that men must oppose "the devil with brave deeds", and that earthly wealth cannot travel to the afterlife nor can it benefit the soul after a man's death.

In its closing verses, the poems makes a series of gnomic statements about God, eternity, and self-control; the poem then ends with the single word "Amen".

== Structure ==
Many scholars think of the seafarer's narration of his experiences as an exemplum, used to make a moral point and to persuade his hearers of the truth of his words. It has been proposed that this poem demonstrates the fundamental Anglo-Saxon belief that life is shaped by fate. In The Search for Anglo-Saxon Paganism (1975), Eric Stanley pointed out that Henry Sweet's Sketch of the History of Anglo-Saxon Poetry in W. C. Hazlitt's edition of Warton's History of English Poetry (1871), expresses a typical 19th century pre-occupation with "fatalism" in the Old English elegies. Another understanding was offered in the Cambridge Old English Reader, namely that the poem is essentially concerned to state: "Let us (good Christians, that is) remind ourselves where our true home lies and concentrate on getting there".

As early as 1902, W. W. Lawrence had concluded that the poem was a "wholly secular poem revealing the mixed emotions of an adventurous seaman who could not but yield to the irresistible fascination for the sea in spite of his knowledge of its perils and hardships".

"The Seafarer" has attracted the attention of scholars and critics, creating a substantial amount of critical assessment. Many of these studies initially debated the continuity and unity of the poem. One early interpretation, also discussed by W. W. Lawrence, was that the poem could be thought of as a conversation between an old seafarer, weary of the ocean, and a young seafarer, excited to travel the high seas. This interpretation arose because of the arguably alternating nature of the emotions in the text.

Another argument, in "The Seafarer: An Interpretation" (1937), was proposed by O. S. Anderson, who stated:

A careful study of the text has led me to the conclusion that the two different sections of The Seafarer must belong together, and that, as it stands, it must be regarded as in all essentials genuine and the work of one hand: according to the reading I propose, it would not be possible to omit any part of the text without obscuring the sequence.

He nevertheless also suggested that the poem can be split into three different parts, naming the first part A1, the second part A2, and the third part B, and conjectured that it was possible that the third part had been written by someone other than the author of the first two sections. The third part may give an impression of being more influenced by Christianity than the previous parts. However, he also stated that

the only way to find the true meaning of The Seafarer is to approach it with an open mind, and to concentrate on the actual wording, making a determined effort to penetrate to what lies beneath the verbal surface

and added, to counter suggestions that there had been interpolations, that: "personally I believe that [lines 103–124] are to be accepted as a genuine portion of the poem". Moreover, in "The Seafarer; A Postscript", published in 1979, writing as O. S. Arngart, he simply divided the poem into two sections. The first section represents the poet's life on earth, and the second tells us of his longing to voyage to a better world, to Heaven.

In most later assessments, scholars have agreed with Anderson/Arngart in arguing that the work is a well-unified monologue. In 1975, David Howlett published a textual analysis which suggested that both "The Wanderer" and "The Seafarer" are "coherent poems with structures unimpaired by interpolators"; and concluded that a variety of "indications of rational thematic development and balanced structure imply that The Wanderer and The Seafarer have been transmitted from the pens of literate poets without serious corruption." With particular reference to The Seafarer, Howlett further added that "The argument of the entire poem is compressed into" lines 58–63, and explained that "Ideas in the five lines which precede the centre" (line 63) "are reflected in the five lines which follow it". By 1982, Frederick S. Holton had amplified this finding by pointing out that "it has long been recognized that The Seafarer is a unified whole and that it is possible to interpret the first sixty-three-and-a-half lines in a way that is consonant with, and leads up to, the moralizing conclusion".

== Themes ==
Scholars have focused on the poem in a variety of ways. In the arguments assuming the unity of The Seafarer, scholars have debated the interpretation and translations of words, the intent and effect of the poem, whether the poem is allegorical, and, if so, the meaning of the supposed allegory.

=== Wisdom ===
Thomas D. Hill, in 1998, argues that the content of the poem also links it with the sapiential books, or wisdom literature, a category particularly used in biblical studies that mainly consists of proverbs and maxims. Hill argues that The Seafarer has "significant sapiential material concerning the definition of wise men, the ages of the world, and the necessity for patience in adversity".

In his account of the poem in the Cambridge Old English Reader, published in 2004, Richard Marsden writes, "It is an exhortatory and didactic poem, in which the miseries of winter seafaring are used as a metaphor for the challenge faced by the committed Christian". If this interpretation of the poem, as providing a metaphor for the challenges of life, can be generally agreed upon, then one may say that it is a contemplative poem that teaches Christians to be faithful and to maintain their beliefs.

=== Religion ===
Scholars have often commented on religion in the structure of The Seafarer. Critics who argue against structural unity specifically perceive newer religious interpolations to a secular poem.

Sweet's An Anglo-Saxon Reader in Prose and Verse (1894) ends the poem at line 108, not 124. In Old English Poems (1918), Faust and Thompson note that before line 65, "this is one of the finest specimens of Anglo-Saxon poetry" but after line 65, "a very tedious homily that must surely be a later addition". Their translation ends with 'My soul unceasingly to sail o'er the whale-path / Over the waves of the sea', with a note below "at this point the dull homiletic passage begins. Much of it is quite untranslatable." A number of subsequent translators, and previous ones such as Pound in 1911, have based their interpretations of the poem on this belief, and this trend in early Old English studies to separate the poem into two parts—secular and religious—continues to affect scholarship.

Disagreeing with Pope and Whitelock's view of the seafarer as a penitential exile, John F. Vickrey argues that if the Seafarer were a religious exile, then the speaker would have related the "joys of the spirit" and not his miseries to the reader. This reading has received further support from Sebastian Sobecki, who argues that Whitelock's interpretation of religious pilgrimage does not conform to known pilgrimage patterns at the time. Instead, he proposes the vantage point of a fisherman. However, the text contains no mention, or indication of any sort, of fishes or fishing; and it is arguable that the composition is written from the vantage point of a fisher of men; that is, an evangelist. Douglas Williams suggested in 1989: "I would like to suggest that another figure more completely fits its narrator: The Evangelist". Marsden points out that although at times this poem may seem depressing, there is a sense of hope throughout it, centered on eternal life in Heaven.

=== Literal view ===
Dorothy Whitelock claimed that the poem is a literal description of the voyages with no figurative meaning, concluding that the poem is about a literal penitential exile.

=== Allegorical view ===
Pope believes the poem describes a journey not literally but through allegorical layers. Greenfield, however, believes that the seafarer's first voyages are not the voluntary actions of a penitent but rather imposed by a confessor on the sinful seaman.

Daniel G. Calder argues that the poem is an allegory for the representation of the mind, where the elements of the voyages are objective symbols of an "exilic" state of mind. Contrasted to the setting of the sea is the setting of the land, a state of mind that contains former joys. When the sea and land are joined through the wintry symbols, Calder argues the speaker's psychological mindset changes. He explains that is when "something informs him that all life on earth is like death. The land the seafarer seeks on this new and outward ocean voyage is one that will not be subject to the mutability of the land and sea as he has known". John F. Vickrey continues Calder's analysis of "The Seafarer" as a psychological allegory. Vickrey argued that the poem is an allegory for the life of a sinner through the metaphor of "the boat of the mind", a metaphor used "to describe, through the imagery of a ship at sea, a person's state of mind".

== Language and text ==
=== Sylf ===
John C. Pope and Stanley Greenfield have specifically debated the meaning of the word sylf (modern English: 'self, very, own'), which appears in the first line of the poem. They also debate whether the seafarer's earlier voyages were voluntary or involuntary.

=== Anfloga and onwælweg ===
In Medium Ævum (1957–1959), G. V. Smithers drew attention to the following points in connection with the word anfloga, which occurs in line 62b of the poem: 1. The anfloga brings about the death of the person speaking. 2. It is characterized as eager and greedy. 3. It moves through the air. 4. It yells. As a result, Smithers concluded that it is therefore possible that the anfloga designates a valkyrie. Smithers also noted that onwælweg in line 63 can be translated as "on the death road", if the original text is not emended to read on hwælweg, or 'on the whale road [the sea]'. In the unique manuscript of The Seafarer, the words are exceptionally clearly written onwæl weg. This may have some bearing on their interpretation. John R. Clark Hall, in the first edition of his Anglo-Saxon Dictionary (1894), translated wælweg as 'fateful journey' and 'way of slaughter', although he changed these translations in subsequent editions. The 'death-way' reading was adopted by C. W. M. Grein in 1857: 'auf den Todesweg'; by Henry Sweet in 1871: 'on the path of death', although he changed his mind in 1888; and A. D. Horgan in 1979: 'upon destruction's path'. Other translators have almost all favoured 'whale road'. In A Short Dictionary of Anglo-Saxon Poetry (1960), J. B. Bessinger Jr provided two translations of anfloga: 'attacking flier' (p. 3) and 'solitary flier' (p. 4); 'solitary flier' is used in most translations.

=== Unwearnum ===
In the Angelsächsisches Glossar, by Heinrich Leo, published by Buchhandlung Des Waisenhauses, Halle, Germany, in 1872, unwearn is defined as an adjective, describing a person who is 'defenceless, vulnerable, unwary, unguarded or unprepared'. This adjective appears in the dative case, indicating "attendant circumstances", as unwearnum, only twice in the entire corpus of Anglo-Saxon literature: in "The Seafarer", line 63; and in Beowulf, line 741. In both cases, it can be reasonably understood in the meaning provided by Leo, who makes specific reference to "The Seafarer". However, it has very frequently been translated as 'irresistibly' or 'without hindrance'.

== Editions and translations ==
=== Editions ===
- George P. Krapp and Elliot V. K. Dobbie produced an edition of the Exeter Book, containing "The Seafarer", in the Anglo-Saxon Poetic Records in 1936.
- Ida L. Gordon produced the first modern scholarly edition solely dedicated to the poem in 1960.
- Anne L. Klinck included the poem in her compendium edition of Old English elegies in 1992.
- In 2000, Bernard J. Muir produced a revised second edition of The Exeter Anthology of Old English Poetry, first published in 1994 by the Exeter University Press, in two volumes, which includes text and commentary on "The Seafarer".
- In 2023, Martin Foys produced a dual digital facsimile and transcription edition in the Old English Poetry in Facsimile project

It is included in the full facsimile of the Exeter Book by R. W. Chambers, Max Förster and Robin Flower (1933), where its folio pages are numbered 81 verso – 83 recto.

=== List of translations ===
"The Seafarer" has been translated many times by numerous scholars, poets, and other writers, with the first English translation by Benjamin Thorpe in 1842. Between 1842 and 2000 over 60 different versions, in eight languages, have been recorded. The translations fall along a scale between scholarly and poetic, best described by John Dryden as noted in The Word Exchange anthology of Old English poetry: 'metaphrase', or a crib; 'paraphrase', or 'translation with latitude', allowing the translator to keep the original author in view while altering words, but not sense; and 'imitation', which 'departs from words and sense, sometimes writing as the author would have done had she lived in the time and place of the reader'.

- Thorpe, Benjamin (1842), Codex Exoniensis: A collection of Anglo-Saxon poetry, London: Society of Antiquaries, pp. 306–313.
- Merry, George R. (9 February 1889), "The Seafarer, translated from Old English", The Academy, 35 (875), London: 92–3.
- Merry, G. R. (8 February 1890), "The Seafarer: translated from the Anglo-Saxon", The Academy, 37 (927), London: 99–100, hdl:2027/pst.000019066073.
- Brooke, Stopford Augustus (1898), English literature from the beginning to the Norman conquest, Macmillan, pp. 312–313. He writes the poem as a dialogue between an Old and Young Man. He ends at l. 64a, ofer holma gelagu with no indication on the page of remaining lines.
- LaMotte Iddings, Lola (1902), Cook, Albert; Tinker, Chauncey (eds.), Select Translations from Old English Poetry, Ginn and Company, pp. 44–49. The poem is translated in its entirety, with a brief explanatory note on different theories.
- Pound, Ezra (1911), "I Gather the Limbs of Osiris, I: The Seafarer", The New Age, 10 (5): 107.
- Faust, Cosette; Thompson, Stith (1918), Old English Poems, Chicago: Scott, Foresman, pp. 68–71. Introduction notes the book is designed to "meet the needs of that ever-increasing body of students who cannot read the poems in their original form, but who wish nevertheless to enjoy to some extent the heritage of verse which our early English ancestors have left for us" (p. 5).
- LaMotte Iddings, Lola (1920). Poems. Privately printed at Yale University Press, New Haven, pp 109–116. The poem is translated in its entirety in this collection. A post-Pound publication.
- Spaeth, John Duncan (1921), Early English Poems, Princeton: Princeton University Press, pp. 68–71. The poem is explained as a dialogue between The Old Sailor and Youth, and ends at line 66.
- Kershaw, N. (1922), Anglo-Saxon and Norse Poems, Cambridge: Cambridge University Press, pp. 20–27.
- Mackie, W. S. (1934), The Exeter Book, Part II: Poems IX–XXXII, Early English Text Society, vol. 194, London: Oxford University Press, pp. 1–9, OCLC 222637251.
- Scott, Alexander (1949), Seaman's Sang (frae the West Saxon) (The Latest in Elegies ed.), Caledonian Press. Translation into Scots.
- Gordon, R. K. (1954), Anglo-Saxon Poetry (Revised ed.), Everyman, pp. 84–86, OCLC 890839.
- Morgan, Edwin (1954), The Seafarer (Collected Translations ed.), pp. 246–48. Published 1954.
- Raffel, Burton (1964), Poems from the Old English, University of Nebraska Press, OCLC 351287.
- Crossley-Holland, Kevin (1965), The Battle of Maldon and Other Old English Poems, Macmillan, ISBN 9780333036037.
- Alexander, Michael (1966), The Earliest English Poems, Penguin, ISBN 9780520015043.
- Hieatt, Constance B. (1967), Beowulf and Other Old English Poems, Toronto: Odyssey Press, pp. 117–124, ISBN 9780672630125.
- Hamer, Richard (1970), A Choice of Anglo-Saxon Verse, Faber & Faber, ISBN 9780571087648.
- Bradley, S. A. J. (1982), Anglo-Saxon Poetry, Everyman, ISBN 9780460107945.
- Scott, Tom (1993), The Seavaiger (The Collected Shorter Poems of Tom Scott ed.), pp. 83–84. Translation into Scots, c. 1960.
- Harrison-Wallace, Charles (1996), "The Seafarer", ARTES International, vol. 4, pp. 21–25, ISBN 9781562790868.
- Treharne, Elaine (2003), Old and Middle English c. 890 – c. 1400: an anthology (2nd ed.), Barnes & Noble, pp. 17–23, ISBN 0631230742.
- Riach, Amy Kate (2010), The Seafarer, London: Sylph, ISBN 9781909631052.
- Williamson, Craig (2011), Beowulf and other Old English Poems, Philadelphia: University of Pennsylvania Press, pp. 150–155, ISBN 9780812243451.
- Salter, Mary Jo (2011), "The Seafarer", in Matto; Delanty (eds.), The Word Exchange, Norton, pp. 27–39, ISBN 9780393342413.

== Creative adaptations and interpretations ==
=== Ezra Pound, 1911 ===
American expatriate poet Ezra Pound produced a well-known interpretation of "The Seafarer", and his version varies from the original in theme and content. It all but eliminates the religious element of the poem, and addresses only the first 99 lines. However, Pound mimics the style of the original through the extensive use of alliteration, which is a common device in Anglo-Saxon poetry. His interpretation was first published in The New Age on November 30, 1911, in a column titled 'I Gather the Limbs of Osiris', and in his Ripostes in 1912. J. B. Bessinger Jr noted that Pound's poem 'has survived on merits that have little to do with those of an accurate translation'. Pound's version was reprinted in the Norton Anthology of Poetry (2005).

=== Jila Peacock, 1999 ===
Painter and printmaker Jila Peacock created a series of monoprints in response to the poem in 1999. She went on to collaborate with composer Sally Beamish to produce the multi-media project 'The Seafarer Piano trio', which premiered at the Alderton Arts festival in 2002. Her prints have subsequently been brought together with a translation of the poem by Amy Kate Riach, published by Sylph Editions in 2010.

=== Sally Beamish, 2001 ===
Composer Sally Beamish has written several works inspired by "The Seafarer" since 2001. Her Viola Concerto no. 2 was jointly commissioned by the Swedish and Scottish Chamber Orchestras, and first performed by Tabea Zimmermann with the Scottish Chamber Orchestra, at the City Halls, Glasgow, in January 2002. Another piece, The Seafarer Trio was recorded and released in 2014 by Orchid Classics.

=== Sylph Editions with Amy Kate Riach and Jila Peacock, 2010 ===
Independent publishers Sylph Editions have released two versions of "The Seafarer", with a translation by Amy Kate Riach and Jila Peacock's monoprints. A large format book was released in 2010 with a smaller edition in 2014.

=== Caroline Bergvall, 2014 ===
Caroline Bergvall's multi-media work 'Drift' was commissioned as a live performance in 2012 by Grü/Transtheatre, Geneva, performed at the 2013 Shorelines Literature Festival, Southend-on-sea, UK, and produced as video, voice, and music performances by Penned in the Margins across the UK in 2014. 'Drift' was published as text and prints by Nightboat Books (2014). 'Drift' reinterprets the themes and language of 'The Seafarer' to reimagine stories of refugees crossing the Mediterranean sea, and, according to a review in Publishers Weekly of May 2014, 'toys with the ancient and unfamiliar English'.

== See also ==
- The Wanderer
- Deor
- The Wife's Lament
- The Ruin
- The Exeter Book
