= Anne Klinck =

Canadian academic (1943–2023)

- Born: January 4, 1943; Chester, England
- Died: July 7, 2023 (aged 80)
- Occupations: Academic, writer

Anne Lingard Klinck (née Hibbert; January 4, 1943 – July 7, 2023) was a Canadian academic and writer. Her work focused on the classics and was an authority on the female voice in lyric poetry.

== Early life ==
Klinck was born in Chester, England on January 4, 1943 to British-Canadian father, Sydney Hibbert, as Anne Lingard Hibbert.

== Education ==
Klinck received a bachelor's and a master's degree from the University of Oxford. She also has a master's degree from McGill University and she also has a master's and a PhD from the University of New Brunswick.

== Career ==
Klinck worked at the University of New Brunswick (UNB) for eighteen years before retiring as Professor Emerita. While working at UNB she co-directed the English programs.

Klinck was an authority on the female voice in lyric poetry.

== Death ==
Klinck died from esophageal cancer on July 7, 2023, at the age of 80.

== Selected publications ==
- Animal Imagery in Wulf and Eadwacer and the Possibilities of Interpretation, Papers on Language and Literature, 23 (1): 3–13
- The Old English Elegies: A Critical Edition and Genre Study, 1992 and 2001, McGill-Queen's University Press ISBN 9780773522411
- The Southern Version of Cursor Mundi, 2000, University of Ottawa Press.
- Anne Kilnck and Anne Marie Rasmusen, Medieval Woman's Song: Cross-Cultural Approaches, 2002, University of Pennsylvania Press
- An Anthology of Ancient and Medieval Woman's Song, 2004 Palgrave Press
- Woman’s Songs in Ancient Greece, 2008, McGill-Queen's University Press ISBN 9780773534483
- The Voices of Medieval English Lyric: An Anthology of Poems, 2019 McGill-Queen's University Press, ISBN 978-0-7735-5882-3
