= Elene =

Old English poem by Cynewulf

Elene is a poem in Old English, that is sometimes known as Saint Helena Finds the True Cross. It was translated from a Latin text and is the longest of Cynewulf's four signed poems. It is the last of six poems appearing in the Vercelli manuscript, which also contains The Fates of the Apostles, Andreas, Soul and Body I, the Homiletic Fragment I and Dream of the Rood. The poem is the first English account of the finding of the Holy Cross by Saint Helena, the mother of Emperor Constantine. The poem was written by Cynewulf some time between 750 and the tenth century. It is written in a West Saxon dialect, but certain Anglianisms and metrical evidence concerning false rhymes suggest it was composed in an Anglian rather than Saxon dialect. It is 1,321 lines long.

== Author and date ==
Cynewulf's signature, which is always in runes, appears on Christ II, Juliana, The Fates of the Apostles and Elene. The dialect in his poems suggests that he was either Mercian or Northumbrian. He most likely flourished during the 9th century, with possible dates extending into the late 8th and early 10th century; some research allows for a late floruit of the mid-to-late 10th century. The Vercelli Book containing the poem is an anthology compiled in the late 10th century.

There have been a number of suggestions identifying the poet Cynewulf with historically attested men, but there is not enough evidence to favour any of these with any certainty. Cynewulf was a frequently given Anglo-Saxon given name. The most plausible candidate for an early date of the poem is Cynewulf of Lindisfarne (d. c. 780), based on the argument that the poet's elaborate religious pieces must lend themselves to "the scholarship and faith of the professional ecclesiastic speaking with authority"; alternative suggestions for the poet's identity include Cynwulf, a Dunwich priest (fl. 803), Cynewulf, the father of Bishop Cyuneweard of Wells, who died in 975, and Cenwulf, Abbot of Peterborough (d. 1006).

== Plot summary ==
The story is loosely based on historical events and takes place within an anachronistic setting that amalgamates wars of the fourth-century involving the Romans, the Huns and the Franks. Elene fits into a subgenre of inventio, the search for sacrosanct relics of the saints. Cynewulf's source for the legend of St. Helena's Finding of the Cross was probably the Acta Cyriaci and a version of it is written in the Acta Sanctorum for May 4.

The poem begins with Constantine, emperor of Rome, riding out to battle the Huns and Hrethgoths. He is a mighty king made strong by God, though he is not aware of the Christian God yet. He sees a vision in the sky and he is told that he will halt his enemies with the symbol that is shown to him by the heavens. The battle begins and Constantine reveals the symbol that he was shown, a cross. The cross sends his enemies running in all directions and they are easily defeated by the Romans.

Constantine returns home and addresses an assembly on whether they know the meaning of the symbol that saved his people. Only the wisest know that the cross is the symbol of the Lord in Heaven, Jesus Christ. Constantine is baptized and becomes a devout Christian, due to his experience. He learns from the Bible how and where Christ was killed, so he orders Helen, his mother, to lead an army to the land of the Jews to find where the true cross is buried. She leads an army of men onto a ship and begins the journey to Palestine.

Once in the city of Jerusalem, she calls an assembly of sage Jews and scorns them for having condemned Jesus to death, leaving them wondering what they have done to anger the queen. Judas tells his fellow Jews that he knows the queen searches for the cross. Judas was brought up on Christian teachings, and his brother Stephen was stoned to death for being a Christian. The Jews refuse to help Helen find the cross, so she threatens them with death. Frightened, they hand over Judas. He also refuses to tell her where it is, so she locks him in a dark prison for seven days without food. On the seventh day he cries out that he cannot take the torture any longer and will reveal where the cross is. He leads the queen to the hill where Jesus was crucified.

Judas converts to Christianity in a passionate speech to God acknowledging Jesus as his Savior. God gives Judas a smoke sign in the sky, which convinces him of his new-found belief. He digs and finds three crosses. A crowd forms, but no one knows which of the three was the cross of Christ. They set the crosses up in the city hoping that Christ would show them the truth. A corpse is brought forth, and each cross is held over him. The third cross brings him back to life.

Satan appears in grotesque form angry that he has had a soul stolen from him. Judas cleverly argues with Satan with his new faith, but Satan leaves with a threat that he will raise up a king to retaliate. Helen sends word home to Constantine, who tells her to build a church on the hillside where the crosses were found. She encases the true cross in gold and jewels and places it in the church. Judas is baptized and puts away his false religion. He is appointed to priesthood and is renamed Cyriacus because of his rebirth.

Helen then decides she needs to find the nails that held Christ up on the cross. Cyriacus searches for them, and God again gives him a sign in the form of fire to show where they are buried. Helen receives the gift with tears of joy, and the Holy Spirit fills her with the gift of wisdom and forever protects the saint. She goes to a wise man to find out how she should use the nails, and he advises her to use them in the bit of Constantine's horse so that he would always be victorious in battle. The epilogue of the poem is devoted to the personal reflection of Cynewulf and his interpretation of Doomsday. Cynewulf tells of how he has experienced a spiritual metamorphosis. His depiction of the Last Judgement resembles a sort of Purgatory where people are divided into three groups, two of which undergo cleansing to reach salvation, while the third is damned to eternal Hell.

== Analysis ==
Helen is depicted as heroic, more like certain women in Old Norse literature than the Graeco-Roman saints. Cynewulf does not include her death in the poem as the Latin version does and he does not have her submitting to Constantine and Cyriacus as she does in the Latin version. In fact it is the opposite. We see Cyriacus completely submitting himself to Helen: hæfde Ciriacus / eall gefylled swa him seo æðele bebead, / wifes willan (line 1129b), ('Cyriacus had completely done as the noble woman bade him to do, the will of the woman').

Helen can be understood as an allegory of the Christian Church and its mission to lead men to salvation through acceptance of the Cross. Literally, her mission is to find the true cross, but allegorically, her mission is to evangelize the Jews. Helen is referred to as a warrior queen and she has an army of warriors, but they never fight. The warriors are there to subjugate a powerful enemy, which could be Satan or non-believers. Judas and Helen are an allegory for the relationship of the Church with its members. Judas's dialogue reveals him to be of the human condition; he has the capacity for saintliness and wickedness. Helen's oppressive tactics towards the Jewish elders being rewarded in the end have been discussed in terms of anti-semitism. A Marxist argument can also be made when looking at how Judas eventually submits to his oppressor. He arises from the pit as a heroic-type figure and it seems the reins of authority Elene exercises only do good in the end in apparent support of royal authority on the part of Cynewulf.

In terms of symbolism, the good-bad dichotomy, which is prevalent in Old English verse, finds itself in the oppositions of light and dark imagery in the poem. For instance, it is observed in the poem that Judas spends seven nights in a pit, and the 'darkness' can be seen to convey his obstinacy in refusing to see the 'light' of Christianity.

Along with alliteration, which is a key part to all Old English poetry, there are also places in the poem where Cynewulf applies rhyme in order to emphasize certain words, such as in the battle scene (50-55a):

Ridon ymb rofne, · ðonne rand dynede,
campwudu clynede, · cyning ðreate for,
herge to hilde. · Hrefen uppe gol,
wan ond wælfel. · Werod wæs on tyhte.
Hleopon hornboran, · hreopan frican,
mearh moldan træd.

('They rode about the famous one; then the shield dinned, the battle-tarp clanged, the king advanced with a troop, a battalion to the battle. The raven yelled from above, dark and greedy for carrion. The troop was on the march. The horn-bearers ran, the heralds called out, the horse trod the earth'),

In this example, the rhymes emphasize the din of voices and the crash of weapons, which builds excitement throughout the battle scene.

== Editions and translations ==
Elene is preserved in a single manuscript version of the late 10th century, in the Vercelli Book, fol. 121a-133b. The first edition of the text was prepared by Benjamin Thorpe in 1835, but it remained unpublished, although copies of his text circulated among scholars, and one such copy was the basis of the Jacob Grimm's edition published in 1840. John Mitchell Kemble partly based his 1856 Poetry of the Codex Vercellensis on Grimm's edition. A critical edition by C. W. M. Grein appeared in Bibliothek der angelsächsischen Poesie in 1858.

Later editions include:

- 1889: Kent, Charles W. (ed.) Elene: An Old English Poem. London: Ginn & Company.
- 1958: Gradon, P.O.E. (ed.). Cynewulf's Elene. London: Methuen.
- 1932: Krapp, George Philip (ed.). Vercelli Book. ASPR. New York: Columbia University Press. 67-102. 132-152.
- 1991: Nelson, N. (ed. and tr.). Judith, Juliana, and Elene. Three Fighting Saints. American University Studies 4. English Language and Literature 135. New York, 114-87.
- 2019: Foys, Martin et al. (ed. to digital facsimile and tr.). Old English Poetry in Facsimile Project. Center for the History of Print and Digital Culture. Madison, 2019.

Modern English translations:

- Bradley, S.A.J. (tr.). Anglo-Saxon Poetry. London: Everyman's Library, 1982. 164-197.
- Kennedy, Charles W. (tr.). "St. Helena Finds the True Cross." In Early English Christian Poetry. New York: Oxford University Press, 1961. 179-214.
