= Northumbria =

Medieval English kingdom

Coordinates: 55°00′N 2°30′W

Kingdom of Northumbria Norþhymbre (Old English) Regnum Northanhymbrorum (Latin)
- 604–1066
- Flag as inferred from a brief mention in the Ecclesiastical History of the English People

- Northumbria around 700 AD
- Status: Unified: Anglian kingdom (until 867; 872–876; 877–883; c. 910–c. 918); Earldom of England (954–1066); North: Puppet state of the Danes (867–872); Independent Anglian kingdom (883–910); Autonomous territory under English overlordship (927–1066); South (Scandinavian York): Danish kingdom (867–872; 876–877; 883–c. 910; 918–927; 939–944; 947–954); Autonomous territory under English overlordship (927–939; 944–947); Centre: Danish kingdom (867–872; 876–877; Ecclesiastical principality: 883–1836)
- Common languages: Northumbrian; Old Norse; Old Danish; Brythonic Celtic
- Religion: Paganism (before 635 A.D.); Christianity (after 635 A.D.)
- Demonym: Northumbrian
- Government: Monarchy
- King of Northumbria
- History
  - Union of the crowns of Bernicia and Deira: 604
  - Deira is conquered by Vikings: 867
  - Bernicia accepts the rule of King Æthelstan: 927
  - Last Viking king expelled by King Eadred: 954
  - Norman Conquest: 1066
- Currency: Sceat, penny
Preceded by	Succeeded by
Bernicia; Deira	Kingdom of Scotland; Kingdom of England
- Today part of: United Kingdom; England; Scotland

Northumbria (Note: /nɔːrˈθʌmbriə/) was an early medieval kingdom in Great Britain, existing between 604 and 1066 AD, that spanned the area of modern-day Southern Scotland and Northern England.

The name derives from the Old English Norþhymbre meaning "the people or province north of the Humber", as opposed to the people south of the Humber Estuary. What was to become Northumbria started as two kingdoms, Deira in the south and Bernicia in the north. Conflict in the first half of the seventh century ended with the murder of the last king of Deira in 651, and Northumbria was thereafter unified under Bernician kings.

As the kingdom extended from the Humber, Peak District and the River Mersey in the south to the Firth of Forth in the north. The sub-kingdom of Lindsey, south of the Humber, was also part of the kingdom of Northumbria for much of its existence. Northumbria ceased to be an independent kingdom in the mid-tenth century when Deira was conquered by the Danes and formed into the Kingdom of York. The rump Earldom of Bamburgh maintained control of Bernicia for a period of time; however, the area north of the Tweed was eventually absorbed into the medieval Kingdom of Scotland while the portion south of the Tweed was absorbed into the Kingdom of England as the county of Northumberland and County Palatine of Durham.

== Kingdom (604–954) ==
=== Communities and divisions ===
==== Possible Celtic British origins ====
The kingdom of Northumbria was originally two kingdoms divided approximately around the River Tees: Bernicia was to the north of the river and Deira to the south. It is possible that both regions originated as native Celtic British kingdoms, which the Germanic settlers later conquered, although there is very little information about the infrastructure and culture of the British kingdoms themselves. Much of the evidence for them comes from regional names that are British rather than Angle in origin. The names Deira and Bernicia are likely British in origin, for example, indicating that some British place names retained currency after the Germanic migrations to Northumbria. (Note: In addition to Bernicia and Deira, some other British place names are recorded for important Northumbrian locations. Northumbrian scholar Bede (c. 731) and Welsh ninth-century chronicler Nennius both provide British place names for centres of power. Nennius, for example, refers to the royal city of Bamburgh as Din Guaire.) There is also some archaeological evidence to support British origins for the polities of Bernicia and Deira. In what would have been southern Bernicia, in the Cheviot Hills, a hill fort at Yeavering Bell contains evidence that it was an important centre for first the British and later the Northumbrians. The fort is originally pre-Roman, dating back to the Iron Age at around the first century. In addition to signs of Roman occupation, the site contains evidence of timber buildings that pre-date Germanic settlement in the area that are probably signs of British settlement. Moreover, Brian Hope-Taylor has traced the origins of the name Yeavering, which looks deceptively Northumbrian, back to the British gafr from Bede's mention of a township called Gefrin in the same area. Yeavering continued to be an important political centre after the Angles began settling in the north, as King Edwin had a royal palace at Yeavering.

Overall, Angle place-names dominate the Northumbrian landscape, suggesting the prevalence of an Anglian elite culture by the time that Bede —Northumbria's most prominent historian —was writing in the eighth century. According to Bede, the Angles were the predominant Germanic immigrants, who settled north of the Humber and gained political prominence during this period. While the British natives may have partially assimilated into the Northumbrian political structure, relatively contemporary textual sources such as Bede's Historia ecclesiastica gentis Anglorum depict relations between Northumbrians and the British as at times fraught.

==== Unification of Bernicia and Deira ====
The Anglian states of Bernicia and Deira were often in conflict before their eventual semi-permanent unification in 604. Political power in Deira was concentrated in the East Riding of Yorkshire, which included York, the North York Moors, and the Vale of York. The political heartlands of Bernicia were the areas around Bamburgh and Lindisfarne, Monkwearmouth and Jarrow, and in Cumbria, west of the Pennines in the area around Carlisle. The name that these two states eventually united under, Northumbria, might have been coined by Bede and made popular through his Ecclesiastical History of the English People.

Information on the early royal genealogies for Bernicia and Deira comes from Bede's Ecclesiastical History of the English People and Nennius' Historia Brittonum. According to Nennius, the Bernician royal line begins with Ida, son of Eoppa. Ida reigned for twelve years (beginning in 547) and was able to annex Bamburgh to Bernicia. In Nennius' genealogy of Deira, a king named Soemil was the first to separate Bernicia and Deira, which could mean that he wrested the kingdom of Deira from the native British. The date of this supposed separation is unknown. The first Deiran king to make an appearance in Bede's Historia Ecclesiastica Gentis Anglorum is Ælla, the father of the first Christian Northumbrian king Edwin.

A king of Bernicia, Ida's grandson Æthelfrith, was the first ruler to unite the two polities under his rule. He exiled the Deiran Edwin to the court of King Rædwald of East Anglia to claim both kingdoms, but Edwin returned in approximately 616 to conquer Northumbria with Rædwald's aid. Edwin, who ruled from approximately 616 to 633, was one of the last kings of the Deiran line to reign over all of Northumbria. Oswald's brother Oswiu eventually succeeded him to the Northumbrian throne despite initial attempts on Deira's part to pull away again. The last independent king of Deira was Oswine. He was murdered by Oswiu in 651, and Northumbria was thereafter united under Bernician rule.

While violent conflicts between Bernicia and Deira played a significant part in determining which line ultimately gained supremacy in Northumbria, marriage alliances also helped bind these two territories together. Æthelfrith married Edwin's sister Acha, although this marriage did little to prevent future squabbles between the brothers-in-law and their descendants. The second intermarriage was more successful, with Oswiu marrying Edwin's daughter and his own cousin Eanflæd to produce Ecgfrith, the beginning of the Northumbrian line. However, Oswiu had another relationship with an Irish woman named Fina which produced the problematic Aldfrith. In his Life and Miracles of St. Cuthbert, Bede declares that Aldfrith, known as Fland among the Irish, was illegitimate and therefore unfit to rule.

==== Northumbria and Norse settlement ====
England in 878. The independent rump of the former Kingdom of Northumbria (yellow) was to the north of the Danelaw (pink).

The Viking invasions of the ninth century and the establishment of the Danelaw once again divided Northumbria. Although primarily recorded in the southern provinces of England, the Anglo-Saxon Chronicles (particularly the D and E recensions) provide some information on Northumbria's conflicts with Vikings in the late eighth and early ninth centuries. According to these chronicles, Viking raids began to affect Northumbria when a band attacked Lindisfarne in 793. After this initial catastrophic blow, Viking raids in Northumbria were either sporadic for much of the early ninth century or evidence of them was lost. However, in 865 the so-called Great Heathen Army landed in East Anglia and began a sustained campaign of conquest. The Great Army fought in Northumbria in 866–867, striking York twice in less than one year. After the initial attack the Norse left to go north, leaving Kings Ælle and Osberht to recapture the city. The E recension of the Anglo-Saxon Chronicle suggests that Northumbria was particularly vulnerable at this time because the Northumbrians were once again fighting amongst themselves, deposing Osberht in favour of Ælle. In the second raid, the Vikings killed Kings Ælle and Osberht whilst recapturing the city.

After King Alfred re-established his control of southern England, the Norse invaders settled into what came to be known as the Danelaw in the Midlands, East Anglia, and the southern part of Northumbria. In Northumbria, the Norse established the Kingdom of York whose boundaries were roughly the River Tees and the Humber, giving it approximately the same dimensions as Deira. Although this kingdom fell to Hiberno-Norse colonisers in the 920s and was in constant conflict with the West-Saxon expansionists from the south, it survived until 954 when the last Scandinavian king Eric, who is usually identified as Eric Bloodaxe, was driven out and eventually killed.

In contrast, the Great Army was not as successful in conquering territory north of the River Tees. Some raids extended into that area, but no sources mention lasting Norse occupation and there are very few Scandinavian place names to indicate significant Norse settlement in northern regions of Northumbria. The political landscape of the area north of the Tees during the Viking conquest of Northumbria consisted of the Community of St. Cuthbert and the remnants of the English Northumbrian elites. While the religious Community of St. Cuthbert "wandered" for a hundred years after Halfdan Ragnarsson attacked their original home of Lindisfarne in 875, The History of St. Cuthbert indicates that they settled temporarily at Chester-le-Street between the years 875–883 on land granted to them by the Viking King of York, Guthred. According to the twelfth-century account Historia Regum, Guthred granted them this land in exchange for establishing him as king. The land extended from the Tees to the Tyne and anyone who fled there from either the north or the south would receive sanctuary for thirty-seven days, indicating that the Community of St. Cuthbert had some juridical autonomy. Based on their positioning and this right of sanctuary, this community probably acted as a buffer between the Norse in southern Northumbria and the Anglo-Saxons who continued to hold the north.

North of the Tyne, Northumbrians maintained partial political control in Bamburgh. The rule of kings continued in that area with Ecgberht I acting as regent around 867 and the kings Ricsige and Ecgberht II immediately following him. According to twelfth-century historian Symeon of Durham, Ecgberht I was a client-king for the Norse. The Northumbrians revolted against him in 872, deposing him in favour of Ricsige. Although the A and E recensions of the Anglo-Saxon Chronicle report that Halfdan was able to take control of Deira and take a raiding party north of the River Tyne to impose his rule on Bernicia in 874, after Halfdan's death (c. 877) the Norse had difficulty holding on to territory in northern Bernicia. Ricsige and his successor Ecgberht were able to maintain an English presence in Northumbria. After the reign of Ecgberht II, Eadwulf "King of the North Saxons" (r. 890–912) succeeded him for control of Bamburgh, but after Eadwulf's death, rulership of this area switched over to earls who were possible kinsmen or direct descendants of the royal Northumbrian house.

=== Kings ===
==== Æthelfrith (r. 593–616) ====
Æthelfrith was the first Anglo-Saxon leader to hold the thrones of both Deira and Bernicia, and so he ruled over all the people north of the Humber. His rule was notable for his numerous victories over the Britons and the Gaels.

==== Edwin (r. 616–633) ====
Edwin, like Æthelfrith, was king of both Deira and Bernicia and ruled them from 616 to 633. Under his reign, the Isle of Man and the lands of Gwynedd in Northern Wales were incorporated into Northumbria. Edwin married Æthelburh, a Christian Princess from Kent in 625. He converted to Christianity two years later, after a period of heavy consideration and after consulting numerous advisors. Edwin fell in battle in 633 against Cadwallon of Gwynedd and the pagan Penda of Mercia. He was venerated as a saint and martyr after his death.

==== Oswald (r. 634–642) ====
Oswald was a king of Bernicia, who regained the kingdom of Deira after defeating Cadwallon in 634. Oswald then ruled Northumbria until he died in 642. A devout Christian, Oswald worked tirelessly to spread the faith in his traditionally pagan lands. It was during his reign that the monastery at Lindisfarne was created. Oswald fell in the Battle of Maserfield against Penda of Mercia in 642, but his influence endured because, like Edwin, Oswald was venerated as a saint after his death.

==== Oswiu (r. 642–670) ====
Oswiu was the brother of Oswald and succeeded him after the latter's defeat in Maserfield. Oswiu succeeded where Edwin and Oswald failed as, in 655, he slew Penda during the Battle of the Winwaed, making him the first Northumbrian King also to control the kingdom of Mercia. During his reign, he presided over the Synod of Whitby, an attempt to reconcile religious differences between Roman and Celtic Christianity, in which he eventually backed Rome. Oswiu died from illness in 670 and divided Deira and Bernicia between two of his sons. His son Aldfrith of Northumbria took over the throne upon his death.

==== Eadberht (r. 738–758) ====
Eadberht of Northumbria, the brother of Ecgbert, Archbishop of York, is seen by some historians as a return to the imperial ambitions of seventh-century Northumbria, and his reign may represent a period of economic prosperity. He faced internal opposition from rival dynasties, and at least two actual or potential rivals were killed during his reign. In 758, he abdicated in favour of his son Oswulf and became a monk at York. Oswulf was murdered the next year and Æthelwald Moll of Northumbria seized the throne, which he occupied for seven years until he was deposed by Alhred. Æthelred I of Northumbria, son of Æthelwald, reigned for 10 interrupted years to 796.

==== Halfdan Ragnarsson (r. 876–877) ====
Halfdan Ragnarsson was a Viking leader of the Great Heathen Army which invaded England in 865. He allegedly wanted revenge against Northumbria for the death of his father, who was supposedly killed by Ælla of Northumbria. While he himself only ruled Northumbria directly for about a year in 876, he placed Ecgberht on the throne as a client-king, who ruled from 867 to 872. Halfdan was killed in Ireland in 877 whilst trying to regain control over Dyflin (Dublin), a land he had ruled since 875. There were no further Viking kings in Northumbria until Guthfrith took over in 883.

==== Æthelstan of Wessex (r. 927–939) ====
Æthelstan ruled as King of the Anglo-Saxons from 924 to 927 and King of the English from 927 to 939. The shift in his title reflects that in 927, Æthelstan conquered the Viking Kingdom of York, previously part of the Northumbrian Kingdom. His reign was quite prosperous and saw great strides in many fields such as law and economics, but was also characterized by frequent clashes with the Scots and the Vikings. Æthelstan died in 939, which led to the Vikings' retaking of York. Æthelstan is widely considered one of the greatest Anglo-Saxon kings for his efforts to consolidate the English kingdom and the prosperity his reign brought.

==== Eric of York (r. 947–948, 952–954) ====
In the early twentieth century, historians identified Eric of York with the Norwegian king Eric Bloodaxe, although more recent scholarship has challenged this association. He held two short terms as King of Northumbria, from 947 to 948 and 952 to 954. (Note: Although the Northumbrian king Eric was conflated with King Eric Bloodaxe of Norway in Icelandic sagas, Clare Downham and others have recently argued that the two were separate people. For a discussion of this shift in identification, see Downham, Clare 2004 "Eric Bloodaxe – Axed? The Mystery of the Last Scandinavian King of York", Medieval Scandinavia, vol. 14, pp. 51–77) Historical documentation on his reign is scarce, but it seems Eric pushed out the joint English-Viking rulers of Northumbria in 947, who then regained the land in 948 or 949. Eric took back the throne in 952, only to be deposed again in 954. Eric was the last Viking king of Northumbria, and his authority only extended to the southern kingdom of York. In 954, he was murdered, allegedly with the connivance of Oswulf, the Anglo-Saxon ruler of the northern Northumbrian territory of Bamburgh.

==== Eadred of Wessex (r. 946–954) ====
King Eadred was the half-brother of Æthelstan and full brother of Edmund, all of whom were sons of King Edward the Elder. Eadred inherited the rule of Northumbria, but like Edmund, lost it soon afterwards. When Eadred finally regained control in 954, he appointed Oswulf earl of the whole of Northumbria.

=== Politics and war ===
Between 737 and 806, Northumbria had ten kings, all of whom were murdered, deposed, or exiled or became monks. Between Oswiu, the first king of Northumbria in 651, and Eric Bloodaxe, the last king of Northumbria in 954, there were forty-five kings, meaning that the average length of reign during the entire history of Northumbria is only six and a half years. Of the twenty-five kings before the Danish rule of Northumbria, only four died of natural causes. Of those that did not abdicate for a holy life, the rest were either deposed, exiled, or murdered. Kings during the Danish rule of Northumbria (see Danelaw) were often either kings of a larger North Sea or Danish empire, or were installed rulers.

Succession in Northumbria was hereditary, which left princes whose fathers died before they could come of age particularly susceptible to assassination and usurpation. A noteworthy example of this phenomenon is Osred, whose father Aldfrith died in 705, leaving the young boy to rule. He survived one assassination attempt early in his rule, but fell victim to another assassin at the age of nineteen. During his reign, he was adopted by Wilfrid, a powerful bishop. Ecclesiastical influence in the royal court was not an unusual phenomenon in Northumbria, and usually was most visible during the rule of a young or inexperienced king. Similarly, ealdormen, or royal advisors, had periods of increased or decreased power in Northumbria, depending on who was ruling at the time.

Warfare in Northumbria before the Danish period largely consisted of rivalries with the Picts to the north. The Northumbrians were successful against the Picts until the Battle of Dun Nechtain in 685, which halted their expansion north and established a border between the two kingdoms. Warfare during the Danish period was dominated by warfare between the Northumbrians and other English Kingdoms.

== Ealdormen and earldoms of Northumbria ==
After the West Saxons from Wessex absorbed the Danish-ruled territories south of the Tees, Scots invasions reduced the rump Northumbria to an earldom stretching from the Tyne to the Tweed. The surviving Earldom of Northumbria, alongside the Haliwerfolk between the Tyne and Tees, were then disputed between the emerging kingdoms of England and Scotland, with the Earldom being split roughly in half along the River Tweed.

== Religion ==
=== Roman and post-Roman Britain ===
Under Roman rule, some Britons north of the Humber practised Christianity. York had a bishop as early as the fourth century. After the Romans left Britain in the early fifth century, Christianity did not disappear, but it existed alongside Celtic paganism, and possibly many other cults. Anglo-Saxons brought their own Germanic pagan beliefs and practices when they settled there. At Yeavering, in Bernicia, excavations have uncovered evidence of a pagan shrine, animal sacrifice, and ritual burials.

=== Conversion of the Anglo-Saxons to Christianity ===
The first King of Northumbria to convert to Christianity was King Edwin. He was baptised by Paulinus in 627. Shortly thereafter, many of his people followed his conversion to the new religion, only to return to paganism when Edwin was killed in 633. Paulinus was Bishop of York, but only for a year.

The lasting conversion of Northumbria took place under the guidance of the Irish cleric Aidan. He converted King Oswald of Northumbria in 635, and then worked to convert the people of Northumbria. King Oswald moved the bishopric from York to Lindisfarne.

=== Monasteries and figures of note ===
The monastery at Lindisfarne was founded by Aidan in 635 and was based on the practices of the Columban monastery in Iona, Scotland. The location of the bishopric shifted to Lindisfarne, and it became the centre for religion in Northumbria. The bishopric would not leave Lindisfarne and shift back to its original location at York until 664. Throughout the eighth century, Lindisfarne was associated with important figures. Aidan, the founder, Wilfrid, a student, and Cuthbert, a member of the order and a hermit, all became bishops and later Saints. Aidan assisted Hieu to found her double monastery at Hartlepool. She too came to be venerated as a saint.

The Christian culture of Northumbria was influenced by the continent as well as Ireland. In particular, Wilfrid travelled to Rome and abandoned the traditions of the Celtic church in favour of Roman practices. When he returned to England, he became abbot of a new monastery at Ripon in 660. Wilfrid advocated acceptance of the authority of Rome at the Synod of Whitby. The two halves of the double monastery Monkwearmouth–Jarrow were founded by the nobleman Benedict Biscop in 673 and 681. Biscop became the first abbot of the monastery and travelled to Rome six times to buy books for the library. His successor, Abbot Ceolfrith, continued to add to the library until, by one estimate, the library at Monkwearmouth–Jarrow had over two hundred volumes. One who benefited from this library was Bede.

In the early seventh century in York, Paulinus founded a school and a minster, but not a monastery. The School at York Minster is one of the oldest in England. By the late eighth century, the school had a noteworthy library, estimated at one hundred volumes. Alcuin was a student and teacher at York before he left for the court of Charlemagne in 782.

=== Synod of Whitby ===
In 664, King Oswiu called the Synod of Whitby to determine whether to follow Roman or Irish customs. Since Northumbria was converted to Christianity by the Celtic clergy, the Celtic tradition for determining the date of Easter and Irish tonsure were supported by many, particularly by the Abbey of Lindisfarne. Roman Christianity was also represented in Northumbria by Wilfrid, Abbot of Ripon. By the year 620, both sides were associating the other's Easter observance with the Pelagian Heresy. The King decided at Whitby that Roman practice would be adopted throughout Northumbria, thereby bringing Northumbria in line with Southern England and Western Europe. Members of the clergy who refused to conform, including the Celtic Bishop Colman of Lindisfarne, returned to Iona. The episcopal seat of Northumbria transferred from Lindisfarne to York, which later became an archbishopric in 735.

=== Impact of Scandinavian raiding, settlement and culture ===
The Viking attack on Lindisfarne in 793 was the first of many raids on monasteries of Northumbria. The Lindisfarne Gospels survived, but monastic culture in Northumbria went into a period of decline in the early ninth century. Repeated Viking assaults on religious centres were one reason for the decrease in the production of manuscripts and communal monastic culture.

After 867, Northumbria came under the control of the Scandinavian forces, and there was an influx of Scandinavian immigrants. Their religion was pagan and had a rich mythology. Within the Kingdom of York, once the raids and war were over, there is no evidence that the presence of Scandinavian settlers interrupted Christian practice. It appears that they gradually adopted Christianity and blended their Scandinavian culture with their new religion. This can be seen in carved stone monuments and ring-headed crosses, such as the Gosforth Cross. During the ninth and tenth centuries, there was an increase in the number of parish churches, often including stone sculptures incorporating Scandinavian designs.

== Culture ==
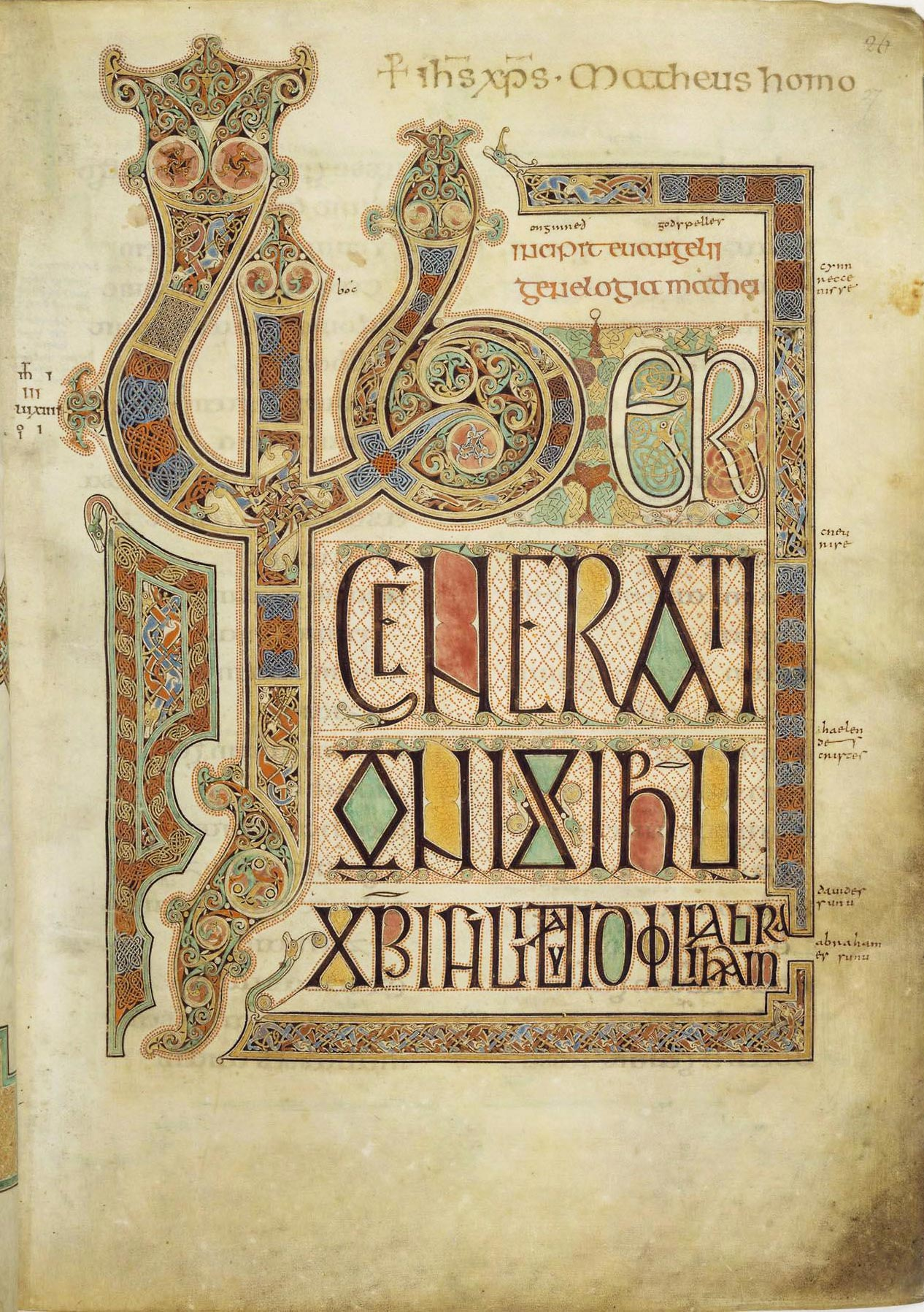
Page from the Lindisfarne Gospels, c. 700, featuring zoomorphic knot-work.

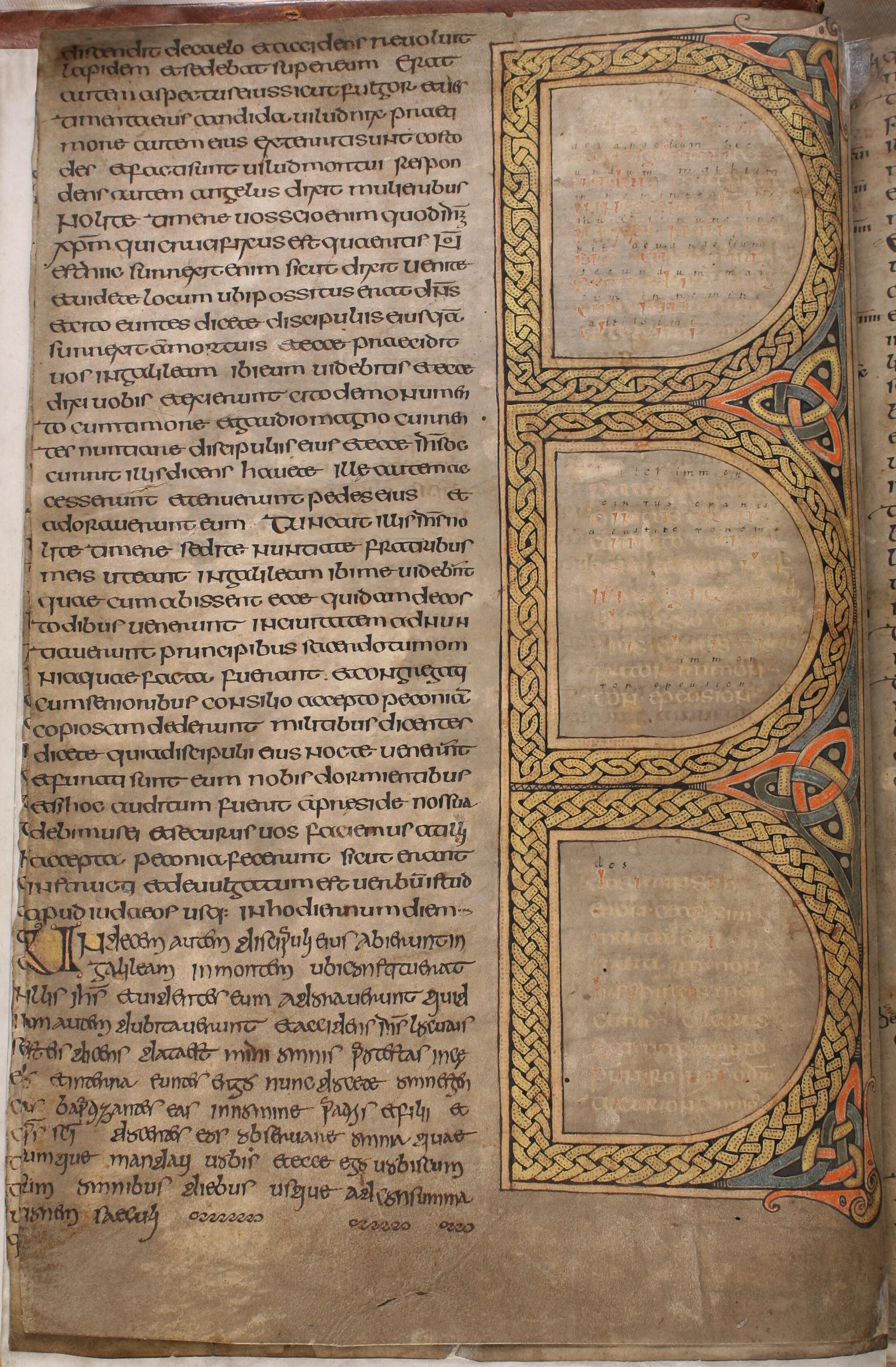
The colophon to the Gospel of Matthew from the Durham Gospel Fragment, featuring non-zoomorphic interlace patterns.

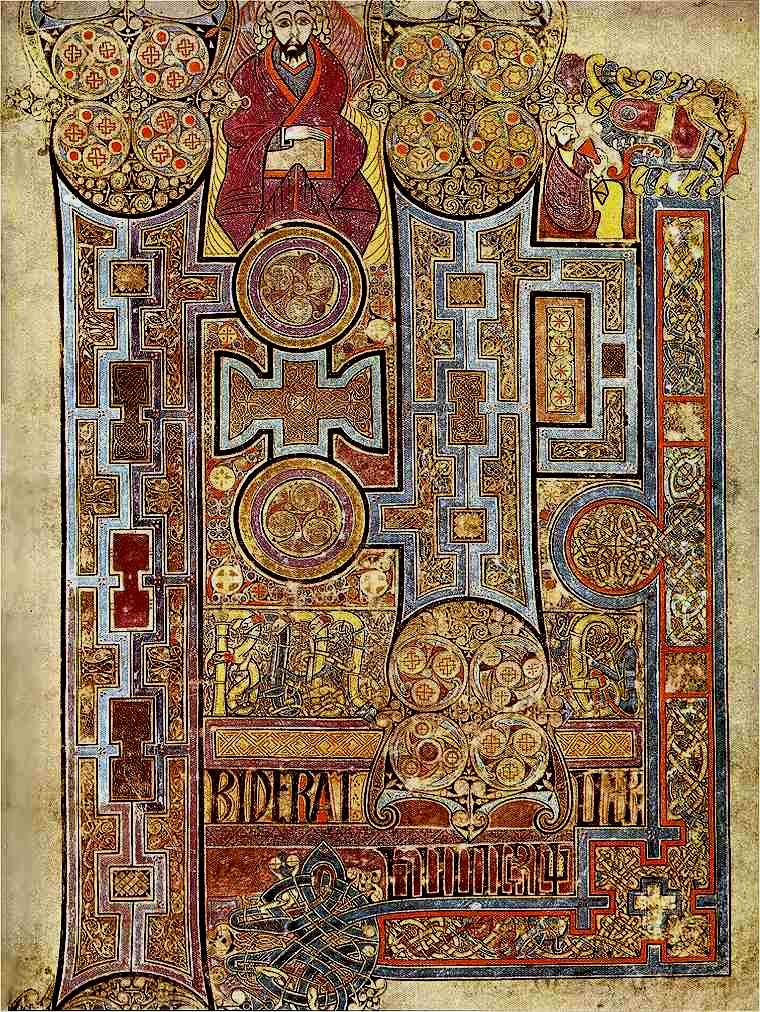
The Book of Kells, (folio 292r), c. 800, showing the lavishly decorated text that opens the Gospel of John

=== Golden Age of Northumbria ===
The Christian culture of Northumbria, fuelled by influences from the continent and Ireland, promoted a broad range of literary and artistic works.

=== Insular art ===
The Irish monks who converted Northumbria to Christianity, and established monasteries such as Lindisfarne, brought a style of artistic and literary production. Eadfrith of Lindisfarne produced the Lindisfarne Gospels in an Insular style.

The Irish monks brought with them an ancient Celtic decorative tradition of curvilinear forms of spirals, scrolls, and doubles curves. This style was integrated with the abstract ornamentation of the native pagan Anglo-Saxon metalwork tradition, characterised by its bright colouring and zoomorphic interlace patterns.

Insular art, rich in symbolism and meaning, is characterised by its concern for geometric design rather than naturalistic representation, love of flat areas of colour, and use of complicated interlace patterns. All of these elements appear in the Lindisfarne Gospels (early eighth century). The Insular style was eventually imported to the European continent, exercising great influence on the art of the Carolingian empire.

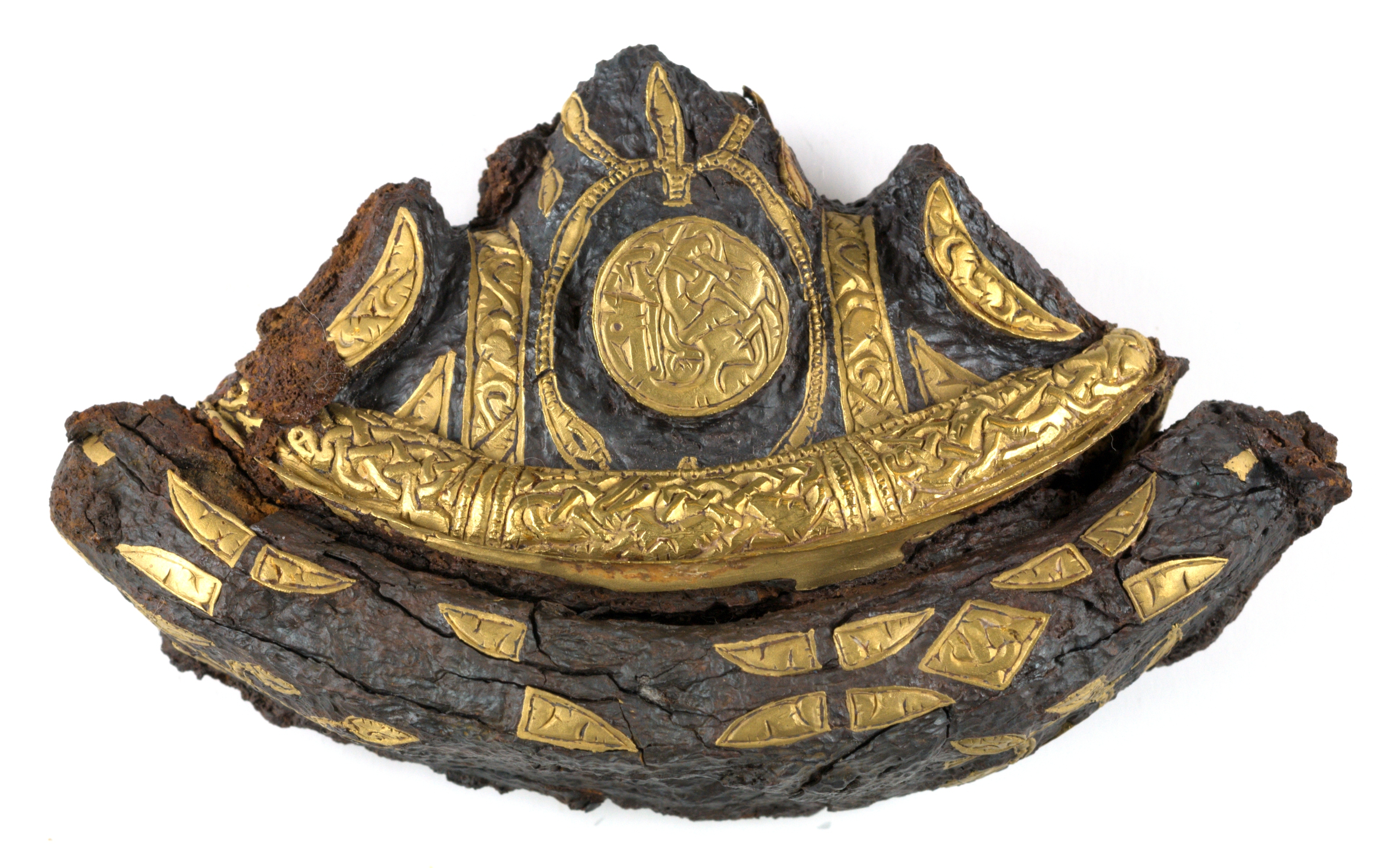
Sword pommel from the Bedale Hoard, inlaid with gold foil.

Usage of the Insular style was not limited to manuscript production and metalwork. It can be seen in sculpture, such as the Ruthwell Cross and Bewcastle Cross. The devastating Viking raid on Lindisfarne in 793 marked the beginning of a century of Viking invasions that severely limited the production and survival of Anglo-Saxon material culture. It heralded the end of Northumbria's position as a centre of influence, although in the years immediately following, visually rich works like the Easby Cross were still being produced.

=== Literature ===
The Venerable Bede (673–735) is the most famous author of the Anglo-Saxon Period, and a native of Northumbria. His Historia ecclesiastica gentis Anglorum (Ecclesiastical History of the English People, completed in 731) has become both a template for later historians and a crucial historical account in its own right, and much of it focuses on Northumbria. He's also famous for his theological works, and verse and prose accounts of holy lives. After the Synod of Whitby, the role of the European continent gained importance in Northumbrian culture. During the end of the eighth century, the scriptorium at Monkwearmouth–Jarrow was producing manuscripts of his works for high demand on the Continent.

Northumbria was also home to several Christian poets. Cædmon lived at the double monastery of Streonæshalch (Whitby Abbey) during the abbacy (657–680) of St. Hilda (614–680). According to Bede, he "was wont to make religious verses, so that whatever was interpreted to him out of scripture, he soon after put the same into poetical expressions of much sweetness and humility in English, which was his native language. By his verse the minds of many were often excited to despise the world, and to aspire to heaven." His sole surviving work is Cædmon's Hymn. Cynewulf, prolific author of The Fates of the Apostles, Juliana, Elene, and Christ II, is believed to have been either Northumbrian or Mercian.

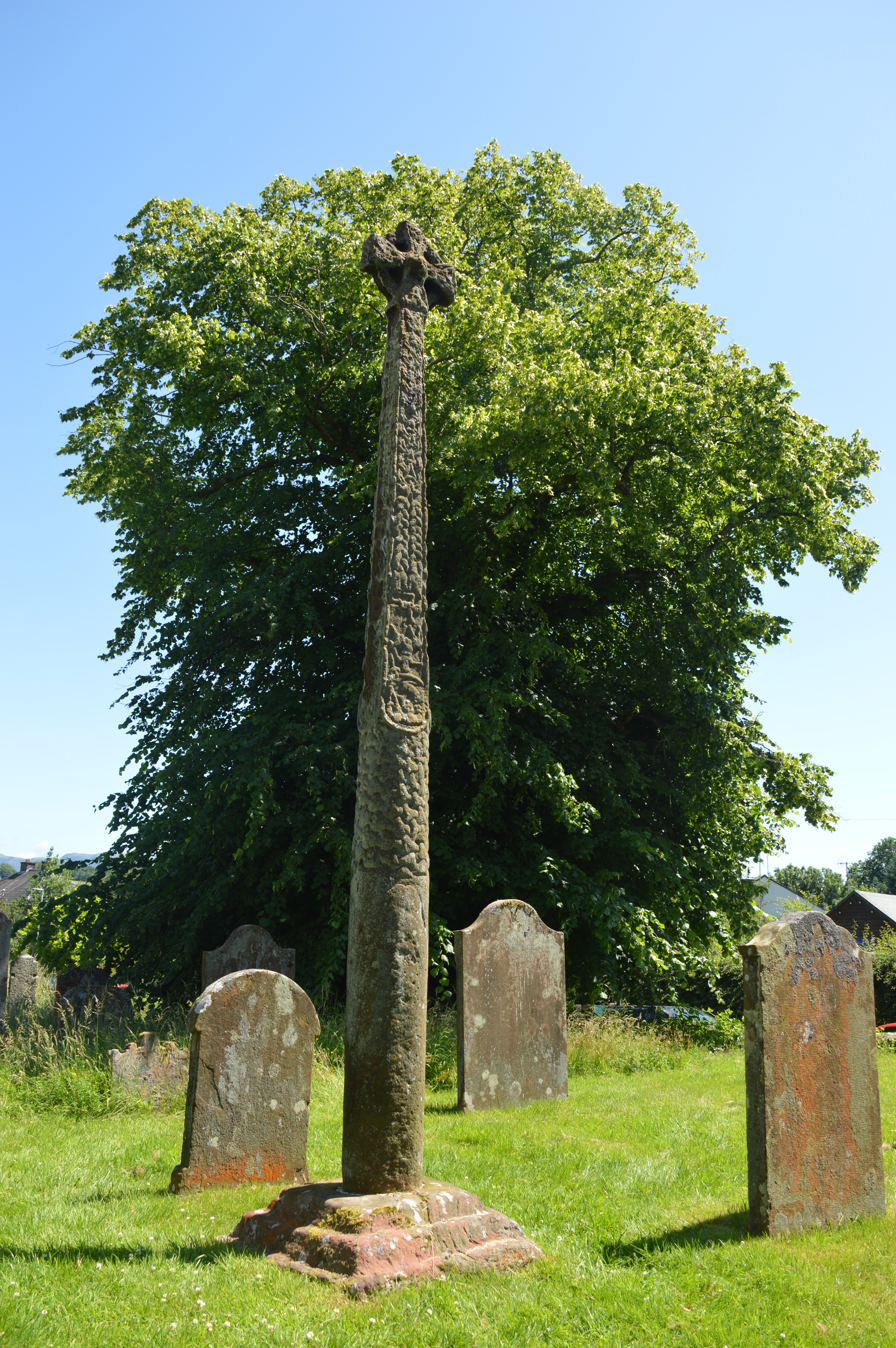
Gosforth Cross, view from the north-west

=== Scandinavians and the Danelaw ===
From around 800, there had been waves of Danish raids on the coastlines of the British Isles. In 865, instead of raiding, the Danes landed a large army in East Anglia, and had conquered a territory known as the Danelaw, including Northumbria, by 867. At first, the Scandinavian minority, while politically powerful, remained culturally distinct from the local population. By the early 900s, however, Scandinavian-style names for both people and places became increasingly popular, as did Scandinavian ornamentation on works of art, featuring aspects of Norse mythology, and figures of animals and warriors.

The synthesis of Angle and Scandinavian and Christian and Pagan visual motifs within the Danelaw can be illustrated by an examination of stone sculpture. However, the tradition of mixing pagan and Christian motifs is not unique to the Danelaw, and examples of such synthesis can be seen in previous examples, such as the Franks Casket. The Franks Casket, believed to have been produced in Northumbria, includes depictions of Germanic legends and stories of the founding Roman and the Roman Church and is dated to the early eighth century. The Gosforth Cross, dated to the early tenth century, stands at 14 feet (4.4 m) and is richly decorated with carvings of mythical beasts, Norse gods, and Christian symbolism. Stone sculpture was not a practice of native Scandinavian culture, and the proliferation of stone monuments within the Danelaw shows the influence that the local population had on the Scandinavian settlers. On one side of the Gosforth Cross is a depiction of the Crucifixion; whilst on the other are scenes from Ragnarok. The melding of these distinctive religious cultures can further be seen in the depiction of Mary Magdalene as a valkyrie, with a trailing dress and long pigtail. Although one can read the iconography as the triumph of Christianity over paganism, it is possible that in the process of gradual conversion the Vikings might have initially accepted the Christian god as an addition to the broad pantheon of pagan gods. The inclusion of pagan traditions in visual culture reflects the creation of a distinctive Anglo-Scandinavian culture. Consequently, this indicates that conversion not only required a change in belief, but also necessitated its assimilation, integration, and modification into existing cultural structures.

== Economy ==
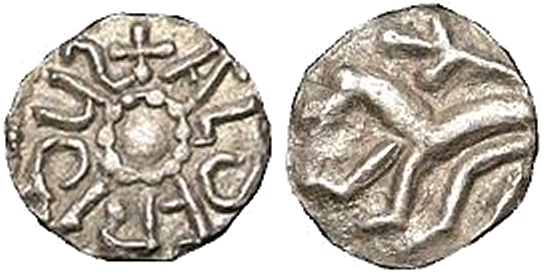
Silver sceatta of Aldfrith of Northumbria (686–705). OBVERSE: +AldFRIdUS, pellet-in-annulet; REVERSE: Lion with forked tail standing left.

Northumbria's economy centred around agriculture, with livestock and land being popular units of value in local trade. By the mid 800s, the Open field system was likely the pre-eminent mode of farming. Northumbria exported grain, silver, hides, and slaves. Imports from Frankia included oil, luxury goods, and clerical supplies in the 700s. Especially after 793, raids, gifts, and trade with Scandinavians resulted in substantial economic ties across the North Sea.

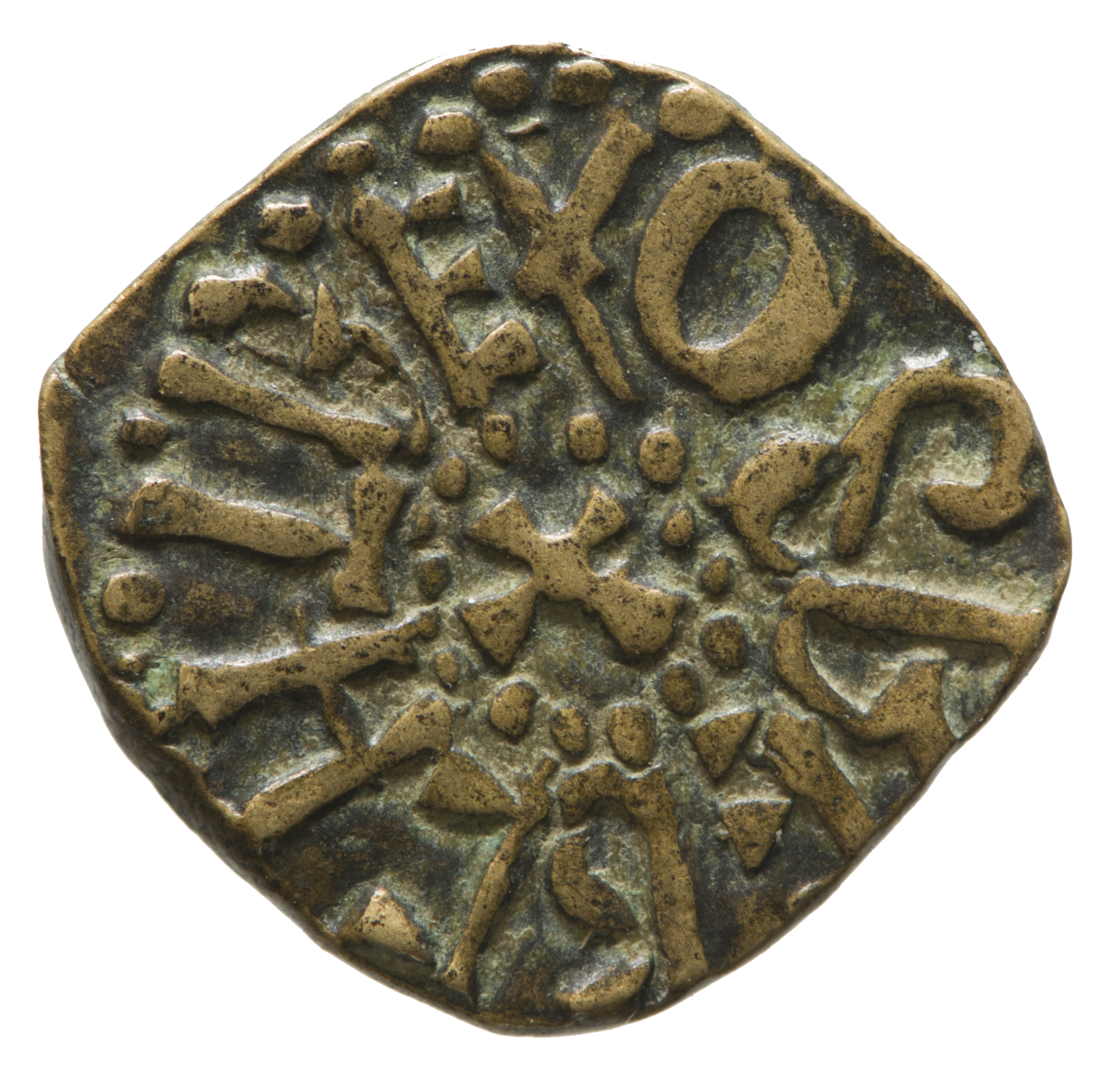
Copper alloy styca of King Osberht (YORYM 2001 3265) obverse

When coinage (as opposed to bartering) regained popularity in the late 600s, Northumbrian coins featured kings' names, indicating royal control of currency. Royal currency was unique in Britain for a long time. King Aldfrith (685–705) minted Northumbria's earliest silver coins, likely in York. Later royal coinage bears the name of King Eadberht (738–758), as well as his brother, Archbishop Ecgbert of York. These coins were primarily small silver sceattas, more suitable to small, everyday transactions than larger gold Frankish or Roman coins. During the reign of King Eanred the silver content of the coins declined until they were produced in copper alloy, these coins are commonly known as stycas, but the term is an antiquarian invention. Stycas remains in use throughout the kingdom until at least the 860s and possibly later. Larger bullion values can be seen in the silver ingots found in the Bedale Hoard, along with sword fittings and necklaces in gold and silver.

== Language ==
In the time of Bede, there were five languages in Britain: English, British, Irish, Pictish, and Latin. (Note: "At the present time, there are five languages in Britain, just as the divine law is written in five books, all devoted to seeking out and setting forth one and the same kind of wisdom, namely the knowledge of sublime truth and of true sublimity. These are the English, British, Irish, Pictish, as well as the Latin languages".) Northumbrian was one of four distinct dialects of Old English, along with Mercian, West Saxon, and Kentish. Analysis of written texts, brooches, runes and other available sources shows that Northumbrian vowel pronunciation differed from West Saxon. Although loans borrowed from the Celtic Languages, such as the Common Brittonic language of the Britons, and the Old Irish of the Irish missionaries, into Old English were few, some place-names such as Deira and Bernicia derive their names from Celtic tribal origins. In addition to the five languages present in Bede's day, Old Norse was added during the ninth century. This was due to the settlements of the Danes in parts of Northumbria, Mercia and East Anglia, an area that became the Danelaw. This language had a strong influence on the dialect of Northumbria. These settlers gave the region many place-names from their language, as well as contributing to the vocabulary, syntax, and grammar of Old English. Similarities in basic vocabulary between Old English and Old Norse may have led to the dropping of their different inflectional endings. The number of borrowed words is conservatively estimated to be around nine hundred in standard English but rises to the thousands in some dialects.

== See also ==
- English of Northumbria
- Geordie dialect words
- Hen Ogledd
- History of Northumberland
- Northumbrian music
- Northumbrian smallpipes
- Northumbrian tartan

== Sources ==
=== Primary sources ===
- Ager, B. M. (2012). "Record ID: YORYM-CEE620 – Early Medieval hoard". Portable Antiquities Scheme.
- Allot, Stephen (1974). Alcuin of York: His Life and Letters. William Sessions Limited. ISBN 978-0900657214.
- Alcuinus, Flaccus Albinus (2006). "Excerpta ex Migne Patrologia Latina: Latinum - Latino - Latin". Documenta Catholica Omnia. Cooperatorum Veritatis Societas.
- Bede (1969). Colgrave, Bertram; Mynors, R. A. B. (eds.). Bede's Ecclesiastical History of the English People. Oxford: Clarendon Press. ISBN 978-0-19-822202-6. (Parallel Latin text and English translation with English notes.)
- Bede (2008). Colgrave, Bertram; McClure; Collins (eds.). Bede's Ecclesiastical History of the English People. Oxford: Oxford University Press. ISBN 978-0199537235.
- Bede (1898). Miller, Thomas (ed.). The Old English Version of Bede's Ecclesiastical History of the English People. Early English Text Society. Original series, no. 95–96, 110–111. London: Published for the Early English Text Society by Oxford University Press. hdl:2027/yale.39002053190329.
- Bede (1990). Latham, R. E. (ed.). Bede's Ecclesiastical History of the English People. Translated by Leo Sherley-Price. London: Penguin Books. ISBN 9780140445657.
- Bede; Stephanus, Eddius; Farmer, David Hugh (1983). The Age of Bede. Harmondsworth, Middlesex, England: Penguin. ISBN 9780140444377.
- Arnold, Thomas, ed. (1885). Historia Regum (Anglorum et Dacorum). Symeonis Monachi Opera Omnia. Vol. 2. Translated by Stevenson, J. London. pp. 1–283.
- Roger of Wendover (1842). Coxe, Henricus (ed.). Flores Historiarum. Sumptibus Societatis.
- Nennius (2005). Historia Brittonum (The History of the Britons). Translated by Rowley, Richard. Cribyn: Llanerch Press. ISBN 9781861431394.
- Stevenson, Joseph, ed. (1885). The Historical Works of Simeon of Durham. The Church Historians of England. Vol. 3. London: London] Seeleys. pp. 425–617.
- Sturluson, Snorri (1964). Hollander, Lee M. (ed.). Heimskringla; history of the kings of Norway. Austin: Published for the American-Scandinavian Foundation by the University of Texas Press. ISBN 9780292732629.
- Swanton, Michael, ed. (1996). The Anglo-Saxon Chronicle. London: Dent. ISBN 9780460877374.

=== Secondary sources ===
- "Anglo-Saxon art". Encyclopædia Britannica Online. 2016.
- Adams, Max (2014). The King in the North : the life and times of Oswald of Northumbria. London: Head of Zeus. ISBN 9781781854204.
- Carver, Martin (2005). The Cross Goes North: Processes of Conversion in Northern Europe, AD 300-1300. Boydell Press. ISBN 978-1-84383-125-9.
- Gradon, P. O. E., ed. (1958). Cynewulf's Elene. London: Methuen. ISBN 9781800857230.
- Higham, N. J. (1993). The kingdom of Northumbria : AD 350–1100. Dover, NH: A. Sutton. ISBN 9780862997304.
- Bosworth, Joseph (1898). An Anglo-Saxon Dictionary: Based on the Manuscript Collections of the Late Joseph Bosworth. Clarendon Press.
- Butler, Alban (1866). "St. Bega, or Bees, of Ireland, Virgin". The Lives of the Fathers, Martyrs, and Other Principal Saints. Dublin: James Duffy.
- Baugh, Albert C. (2002). A History of the English Language (5 ed.). London: Routledge. ISBN 9780415280990.
- Berg, Knut (1958). "The Gosforth Cross". Journal of the Warburg and Courtauld Institutes. 21 (21 (1/2)): 27–30. doi:10.2307/750485. JSTOR 750485. S2CID 195032909.
- Clutton-Brock, Arthur (1899). The Cathedral Church of York, Description of its Fabric and a Brief History of the Archi-Episcopal See. London: George Bell & Sons.
- Corning, Caitlin (2006). The Celtic and Roman Traditions : Conflict and Consensus in the Early Medieval Church. New York: Palgrave Macmillan. ISBN 9781403972996.
- Cuesta, Julia Fernández; Ledesma, Nieves RodrÍguez; Silva, Inmaculada Senra (2008). "Towards a History of Northern English: Early and Late Northumbrian". Studia Neophilologica. 80 (2): 132–159. doi:10.1080/00393270802493217. ISSN 0039-3274. S2CID 161587451.
- Downham, Clare (2004). "Eric Bloodaxe – Axed? The Mystery of the Last Scandinavian King of York". Medieval Scandinavia. 14: 51–77.
- Downham, Clare (2007). Viking Kings of Britain and Ireland: The Dynasty of Ívarr to A.D. 1014. Dunedin Academic Press. ISBN 978-1-903765-89-0.
- Fleming, Robin (2010). Britain after Rome: The Fall and Rise 400 to 1070. London: Penguin Books. ISBN 9780140148237.
- Fairless, Peter J. (1994). Northumbria's Golden Age : the Kingdom of Northumbria, Ad 547–735. York, England: W. Sessions. ISBN 9781850721383.
- Foot, Sarah (12 July 2011). AEthelstan: The First King of England. Yale University Press. ISBN 978-0-300-12535-1.
- Goffart, Walter A. (1988). The Narrators of Barbarian History (A. D. 550–800): Jordanes, Gregory of Tours, Bede, and Paul the Deacon. Princeton, N.J.: Princeton University Press. ISBN 978-0-691-05514-5.
- Hadley, Dawn (2002), "Viking and native: re–thinking identity in the Danelaw", Early Medieval Europe, 11 (1): 45–70, doi:10.1111/1468-0254.00100, S2CID 154018306
- "Hiberno-Saxon style". Encyclopædia Britannica Online.
- Holdsworth, Philip (2014). "Northumbria". In Lapidge, Michael; Blair, John; Keynes, Simon; Scragg, Donald (eds.). The Wiley Blackwell Encyclopedia of Anglo-Saxon England (2nd ed.). Chichester, West Sussex: Wiley Blackwell. pp. 340–341. ISBN 978-0-470-65632-7.
- Hope-Taylor, Brian (1983). Yeavering: An Anglo-British Centre of Early Northumbria. Department of the Environmental Archaeological Reports. London: Leicester University Press.
- Karkov, Catherine E. (2011). The Art of Anglo-Saxon England. Boydell Press. ISBN 978-1-84383-628-5.
- Kirby, D. P. (January 1991). The Earliest English Kings. Unwin Hyman. ISBN 978-0-04-445692-6.
- Lapidge, Michael (26 January 2006). The Anglo-Saxon Library. OUP Oxford. ISBN 978-0-19-153301-3.
- Lapidge, Michael; Blair, John; Keynes, Simon; Scragg, Donald (2 October 2013). Wiley Blackwell Encyclopedia of Anglo-Saxon England. John Wiley & Sons. ISBN 978-1-118-31609-2.
- Leach, Arthur Francis (1915). The Schools of Medieval England. Macmillan. ISBN 9780722229033.
- MacLean, Douglas (1997). "King Oswald's wooden Cross at Heavenfield in Context". In Catherine E. Karkov; Michael Ryan; Robert T. Farrell (eds.). The Insular Tradition: A Resource Manual. SUNY Press. pp. 79–98. ISBN 978-0-7914-3455-0.
- Munch, Peter Andreas; Olsen, Magnus Bernhard (1926). Norse mythology: legends of gods and heroes. The American-Scandinavian Foundation. ISBN 9780404045388.
- Neuman de Vegvar, Carol L. (1990). The Northumbrian Golden Age: The Parameters of a Renaissance. University Microfilms.
- Nordenfalk, Carl (1976). Celtic and Anglo-Saxon Painting: Book illumination in the British Isles 600–800. New York: George Braziller. ISBN 978-0-8076-0825-8.
- Owen-Crocker, Gale R. (1986). Dress in Anglo-Saxon England. Manchester, UK: Manchester University Press.
- Pächt, Otto (1986). Book Illumination in the Middle Ages: An Introduction. H. Miller Pub. ISBN 978-0-19-921060-2.
- Petts, David, Dr.; Turner, Sam, Dr. (2011). Early Medieval Northumbria: Kingdoms and Communities, AD 450-1100. Isd. ISBN 978-2-503-52822-9.
- Rollason, David (25 September 2003). Northumbria, 500-1100: Creation and Destruction of a Kingdom. Cambridge, UK; New York: Cambridge University Press. ISBN 978-0-521-81335-8.
- Richards, J. D. (1 January 1991). Book of Viking Age England. B. T. Batsford. ISBN 978-0-7134-6519-8.
- Schapiro, Meyer (1980). Selected Papers, volume 3, Late Antique, Early Catholic and Mediaeval Art. London: Chatto & Windus. ISBN 978-0-7011-2514-1.
- Sawyer, Peter (2013). The Wealth of Anglo-Saxon England. Oxford: Oxford Scholarship Online. doi:10.1093/acprof:oso/9780199253937.001.0001. ISBN 9780199253937.
- Stenton, Frank M. (7 June 2001). Anglo-Saxon England. OUP Oxford. ISBN 978-0-19-280139-5.
- Goffart, Walter (2005). The narrators of barbarian history (A.D. 550–800) : Jordanes, Gregory of Tours, Bede, and Paul the Deacon. Notre Dame, Ind: University of Notre Dame Press. ISBN 9780268029678.
- Venning, Timothy (30 January 2014). The Kings & Queens of Anglo-Saxon England. Amberley Publishing Limited. ISBN 978-1-4456-2459-4.
- Williams, Ann; Smyth, Alfred P.; Kirby, D. P. (1991). "Athelstan, king of Wessex 924-39". A Biographical Dictionary of Dark Age Britain: England, Scotland, and Wales, C. 500–c. 1050. Psychology Press. ISBN 978-1-85264-047-7.
- Woodman, D. A. (March 2015). "Charters, Northumbria and the Unification of England in the Tenth and Eleventh Centuries". Northern History. LII (1). OCLC 60626360.
- Wood, Ian (2008). "Thrymas, Sceattas and the Cult of the Cross". Two Decades of Discovery. Studies in Early Medieval Coinage. Vol. 1. Woodbridge, UK: Boydell Press. pp. 23–30. ISBN 978-1-84383-371-0.
- Woolf, Rosemary (1955). Juliana. London: Methuen.
- Wormald, Patrick (1999). The Making of English Law: King Alfred to the Twelfth Century. Oxford: Blackwell. ISBN 978-0-631-13496-1.
- Yorke, Barbara (1 January 1990). Kings and Kingdoms of Early Anglo-Saxon England. Seaby. ISBN 978-1-85264-027-9.
