= Christ II =

Poem by Cynewulf

- Also known as: The Ascension or Christ B
- Author(s): Cynewulf
- Language: Old English
- Series: Old English Christ triad, along with Christ I and Christ III, constituting lines 440–866
- Manuscript(s): Exeter Book, fos. 14a-20b
- Genre: Religious poem
- Subject: The Ascension of Jesus

Christ II, also called The Ascension, is one of Cynewulf's four signed poems that exist in the Old English vernacular. It is a five-section piece that spans lines 440–866 of the Christ triad in the Exeter Book (folios 14a-20b), and is homiletic in its subject matter in contrast to the martyrological nature of Juliana, Elene, and Fates of the Apostles. Christ II draws upon a number of ecclesiastical sources, but it is primarily framed upon Gregory the Great’s Homily XXIX on the Feast of the Ascension.

The poem is assigned to a triad of Old English religious poems in the Exeter Book, known collectively as Christ. Christ comprises a total of 1664 lines and deals with Christ's Advent, Ascension and Last Judgment. It was originally thought to be one piece completed by a single author, but the poem is now broken up into three parts.

== Background ==
The poem Christ was originally thought to be one piece completed by a single author. Almost all scholars now break the poems into three parts: Christ I is focused on Advent, Christ II, on the Ascension, and Christ III primarily dealing with Doomsday. The poems are the first items in the Exeter Book which is a rather large manuscript that has 123 (some sources argue 131) folios contained in it. The Exeter Book has been at the Exeter Cathedral Library since 1072 where it was donated by Bishop Leofric. There is no agreement on where the Exeter Book came from. Some argue it was written in a monastic institution in Exeter in the 7th century, while others state it originated in Canterbury or Glastonbury. The book contains 123 leaves, or 246 pages, with a few random missing pages because the book was unbound for a long period of time. Many other pages have holes from burns, cuts by a knife, and stains by a pot of liquid.

Christ is the longest poem by far in the book if one looks at it as an entirety. Christ II has some similar themes to the rest of the Christ poem but it is also very different. All three poems have a unique identity and narrative voice that differs from the others. Christ II is clearly based on the 29th homily that Pope Gregory the Great wrote. Pope Gregory the Great was well known for being the father of Roman Christianity in England, believed to have started the constitution of liturgy, and the compilation of musical service-songbooks used in the church. Gregory focused the end section of his homily on why angels didn't wear white robes at the Incarnation but did at the Ascension.

== Author ==
Cynewulf receives credit for writing Christ II, but his inspiration came from the 23rd Psalm and a homily written by Pope Gregory. Cynewulf is one of very few named Anglo-Saxon poets. His name is found as Cyniwulf, Cynewulf, and Cynwulf; he is also responsible for at least Juliana, The Fates of the Apostles, and Elene. Scholars believe that Cynewulf did not write before 750 because he used an e instead of an i, which was not established until that time. Most assume that he was not writing after the 10th century, either. Some research might show that Cynewulf's Elene corresponds with a portion of a book that was dedicated to Charlemagne as Emperor around 800.

Scholars also speculate about where Cynewulf might have lived. Some hypothesize that Cynewulf was from Dunwich, because he knew a lot about the sea, but there is no evidence to prove that. It has been suggested that Cynewulf was a thegn or retainer to a lord in his youth, and he did not come from noble birth. Cynewulf knew the Latin rudiments, so many assume that he attended the Minster School of York. Scholars also concur that he was a religious man, either a monk or a priest, and possibly both. He was an average believer of his time, who appears to have agreed with Pope Gregory the Great on everything except for the concept of Purgatory. Cynewulf praised the Trinity as being three separate but combined parts, thought sinners may obtain a pardon from Hell if they repent and turn from their sins, and assumed saints could intercede in earthly matters.

Cynewulf's identity is still largely unknown, but he placed his signature in four separate poems. Cynewulf signed his poems using runes which come from the Germanic alphabet that Anglo-Saxons used prior to the Roman alphabet. A rune can stand for an actual letter, or for the word of its name. The first rune cen(c) stands for ‘torch’ while yr(y) represents ‘bow’. These words are sometimes reordered to make more grammatical sense, so it can be difficult to find Cynewulf's signature. At the end of The Fates of the Apostles, Cynewulf signs his names F, W, U, L, C, Y, N. It is speculated that he did this to show that he was a sinner like everyone else, or to relate to the Biblical idea that ‘the last shall be first’.

== Summary ==
Christ II begins by stating how important it is for men to seek out the truth and where it came from. Christ was born of the Virgin Mary in Bethlehem. After he was crucified and rose from the dead he spent forty days on earth before ascending back to heaven. Before Christ left he said to gathered people, “Rejoice in spirit! I shall never leave you, but I shall always continue in love towards you and give you power and remain with you for ever and ever so that by my grace you will never be wanting in virtue.”

After Christ had given his speech, a large number of angels appeared above the temple. They asked the people why they were just standing around and waiting. The angels explained to the people that they were there to escort Christ back to his home in heaven. The people were warned to be ready for the time when Christ would return to judge everyone for the deeds that they have committed. The clouds surrounded Jesus and the angels and joy rang out throughout all of heaven. But the people who had just witnessed this were very sad because of their loss. Men and women were crying and everyone's hearts were heavy. They then departed for Jerusalem, described as the "holy city".

The poem then goes on to praise the Lord and Christ. Peace, it says, is "shared by angels and men alike", and Christ's coming has "liberated" mankind, given the people "good health", and "transformed...misery" into joy. The people must praise God for giving them food, possessions, wealth, and pleasant weather. Praise must also be given for the dew and rain that nourish mankind, as well as the sun and moon.

Long ago, the prophet Job called the Lord's son a bird who would not be understood by many people. The bird flew from his home and came to earth in human form. After all of his work had been done by the grace of God he flew (ascended) back to his home in heaven. There the Lord created mansions for his people. He also instilled wisdom in the minds of his followers and gave others the gift of singing. The Lord also blessed some with skilled fingers for playing the harp or the ability to write down languages. He stands as an upright tree that one can cling to in a time of need. The poem describes how the Lord is willing to give man many gifts—including wisdom, oratorial skill, and success in warfare—but will not give one man everything, for fear that the hypothetical man would grow arrogant and invite harm through boasting of his talents.

After Christ had returned to heaven, many of his church followers faced tough oppression. Pagan governments were in charge and they didn't allow them to worship. The pagans destroyed and burned God's temple and killed many. The Lord will redeem His people and all the problems that they have faced. King Solomon gives hope to the people when he sang, “(the Lord) will garland the hills and heights with his glory; he will redeem the world, all earth’s inhabitants, by that glorious spring.”

The poem then focuses on the six leaps that Christ has already made. His first leap (se forma hlyp) was when he descended to the earth through the Virgin Mary. The second spring (se oþer stiell) was when he was born in the manger. His third leap (se þridda hlyp), Christ ascended the cross (he on rode astag). His fourth spring (se feorða stiell) was when he abandoned the cross (he þone beam ofgeaf) and entered the tomb. His fifth leap (se fifta hlyp) was when he went to hell before his resurrection. The sixth leap (se siexta hlyp) was when the Lord ascended into the heavens with the joyous jubilation of the angels. The motif of Christ's leaps derives from Pope Gregory’s "Twenty-ninth Homily on the Gospels" (or "Ascension Homily") of Homiliae XL in euangelia. The motif is a mystical interpretation of the Song of Solomon (Canticles 2.8) and is found as early as the third century in the work of Hippolytus.

== Works cited ==
Editions and translations

- Foys, Martin et al. (ed.).Old English Poetry in Facsimile Project. Center for the History of Print and Digital Culture, University of Wisconsin-Madison, 2019-); poem edited in transcription and digital facsimile editions, with Modern English translation
- Treharne, Elaine (ed.). Old and Middle English c.890-c1400: an anthology. 2nd ed. Malden, MA: Blackwell, 2004.
- Brooks, Kenneth R. (ed.) “Christ II.” The Anglo-Saxon Poetic Records: a Collective Edition. Vol 3 (1961): 15–27.
- Krapp, George Phillip & Elliot Van Kirk Dobbie, eds. The Exeter Book. New York: Columbia University Press, 1936.
- Chambers, R. W., Max Forster, Robin Flower (eds.). “The Exeter Book of Old English Poetry.” The Anglo-Saxon Poetic Records: a Collective Edition. Vol 3 (1933).
- Bradley, S.A.J. (trans.). Anglo-Saxon Poetry. London: Dent, 1982.
- Cook, Albert S. ed. The Christ of Cynewulf; A poem in three parts: The advent, the Ascension, and the Last Judgment. Freeport, NY: Books for Library Press, 1970.

Secondary sources

- Breeze, Andrew (1989). "The 'Leaps' That Christ Made". Ériu 40: 190–93.
- Bjork, Robert E. Cynewulf: Basic Readings. New York: Garland Pub., 1996.
- Bjork, Robert E. “Cynewulf.” In Medieval England: An Encyclopedia. New York: Garland Pub., 1998.
- Connor, Patrick. “Exeter Book.” Dictionary of the Middle Ages. Supplement 1. New York: Scribner, c1982-c1989.
- Marchland, James W. "The Leaps of Christ and The Dream of the Rood." In Source of Wisdom: Old English and Early Medieval Latin Studies in Honour of Thomas D. Hill, ed. by Charles D. Wright, Frederick M. Biggs, and Thomas N. Hall. Toronto: University of Toronto Press, 2007. Pages 80–89.
- Roberts, Jane. “Cynewulf.” The Blackwell Encyclopedia of Anglo-Saxon England. Oxford: Blackwell, 1991.
