= Andreas (poem) =

Old English poem

Andreas is an Old English poem, which tells the story of St. Andrew the Apostle, while commenting on the literary role of the "hero". It is believed to be a translation of a Latin work, which is originally derived from the Greek story The Acts of Andrew and Matthew in the City of Anthropophagi, dated around the 4th century. However, the author of Andreas added the aspect of the Germanic hero to the Greek story to create the poem Andreas, where St. Andrew is depicted as an Old English warrior, fighting against evil forces. This allows Andreas to have both poetic and religious significance.

== Origins ==
Although the author of Andreas is unknown, there are more general theories concerning its origins. Andreas is the first poem in the Vercelli Book, and is followed by a poem entitled The Fates of the Apostles, written by Cynewulf. Since both works have similar subjects, and because of their proximity in the Vercelli book, they were at first thought to be written by the same author. Andreas is often tied to Cynewulf because of its religious theme; although the exact identity of Cynewulf is unknown, all of the proposed identities were religious figures of the late 8th to early 10th centuries. This clearly ties to Andreas' religious theme, and leads scholars to make a connection between the two. Andreas is included in a group of 12 poems, often referred to as "the Cynewulf group". Still, only four poems are truly attributed to Cynewulf, which are those that are directly marked with runic symbols of his name. Other scholars argue that Andreas may have been written by a disciple of Cynewulf, which would explain the parallels between the two works. However, still other researchers argue that they are different authors because of the drastic differences in the writing style. Some scholars even deduce that Andreas was influenced by Beowulf, as there are many likenesses between the two works in style, language, and theme.

== Content ==
The 1,722 line poem tells the story of St. Andrew, as he rescues St. Matthew from a cannibalistic race called Mermedonians. Cameron states: "The poem is forceful and is the closest to Beowulf in style and tone among the surviving Old English poems". In this anonymously written tale, St. Andrew defies the hardships that he faces, such as turbulent sea and other types of torture and captivity, which mirror the pain and suffering that Christ experienced. The work has religious significance because of the way St. Andrew is loyal to God, and his troops are loyal to him in the poem. This literary allusion helps to give the work religious symbolism, which is characteristic of many works of the time.

The first 500 lines of the poem tell of St. Andrew's time spent at sea rescuing Matthew, which was his mission from God. Matthew had been blinded and held captive by a troop of cannibals in Mermedonia. Jesus and two angels accompany St. Andrew on the ship, masked as a helmsman and two sailors. As this is a tale of discipleship, St. Andrew, or Andreas preaches to the helmsman about the good news of the Bible and the stories of the life of Christ. He is unaware of the true identities of his crew as he speaks with Christ about His life. Andreas' followers loyally stay by his side through the turbulent seas. This ties into the alleged Greek influence on Andreas, as some scholars interpret this a "comitatus", which Riedinger defines as "the traditional aristocratic warrior band." Andreas holds loyal faith in God's power to calm the seas, and the ship and the seas begin to settle. Andreas and his men drift off to sleep, and awaken outside Mermedonia. Christ and His two angels had raised them up and placed them outside the city while they slept. This event allowed Andreas to realize their identities.

Then, in epic and heroic style, St. Andrew is made invisible by God for the close of the poem, which allows him to free the imprisoned from Mermedonia. After doing so, he reveals himself to the enemy and is tortured for three days and nights. Upon praying for forgiveness, God frees and heals Andreas and punishes all of Mermedonia. When the Mermedonians repent and convert, they are restored, and Andreas establishes a Christian church. Andreas is able to sail on after appointing a bishop to watch over the church. This poem has strong religious importance, as many parallels can be drawn between Christ and St. Andrew. Also, this poem encourages repentance and discipleship, which were vital to the growth and well-being of the Catholic Church at the time. The religious significance of Andreas may be the very reason why this text survived, as monks copied it in their manuscripts because of its religious message.

== The Andrew legend in Old English prose ==
The story also appears in a briefer prose version in the Blickling Homilies (no. 19). A somewhat different treatment of the apostle is found in the prose Life by Ælfric of Eynsham, who relates Andrew's martyrdom in Achaia.

== Bibliography ==
Editions

- Bintley, M.; North, R., eds. (2016), Andreas: An Edition, Liverpool: Liverpool University Press, ISBN 9781781382714.
- Clayton, Mary, ed. (2013), Old English Poems of Christ and His Saints, Dumbarton Oaks Medieval Library, vol. 27, translated by Clayton, Mary, Cambridge: Harvard University Press, ISBN 9780674053182.
- Brooks, Kenneth R., ed. (1961), Andreas and The Fates of the Apostles, Oxford: Clarendon Press, OCLC 1011249.
- Foys, Martin; Ernst, Olivia; Friedman, Sarah; Ukropen, Alex; Smith, Kyle; Amundson, Sarah (2022), Foys, Martin; et al. (eds.), Old English Poetry in Facsimile project (digital facsimile edition with modern English translation), Madison, WI: UW-Madison Center for the History of Print and Digital Culture, doi:10.21231/t6a2-jt11.
- Jebson, Tony, ed. (1994), "Andreas", The Labyrinth: Resources for Medieval Studies, Georgetown University, archived from the original on 2009-01-09
- Krapp, G., ed. (1906), Andreas and The Fates of the Apostles, OL 7096389M.
- Krapp, G., ed. (1932), The Vercelli Book, Anglo-Saxon Poetic Records, vol. 2, New York: Columbia University Press, ISBN 9780231087667.

Translations

- Clayton, Mary, ed. (2013), Old English Poems of Christ and His Saints, Dumbarton Oaks Medieval Library, vol. 27, translated by Clayton, Mary, Cambridge: Harvard University Press, ISBN 9780674053182.
- Bradley, S.A.J., ed. (1982), Anglo-Saxon Poetry, translated by Bradley, S.A.J., London: Littlehampton Book Services, pp. 110–53, ISBN 9780460107945.
- Hostetter, Aaron K. (ed.), "Andreas", Anglo-Saxon Narrative Poetry Project, translated by Hostetter, Aaron K., Rutgers.
- Kennedy, Charles W., ed. (2000), "Andreas" (PDF), In parentheses Publications, Old English Series, translated by Kennedy, Charles W., Cambridge, ON: York University.

Secondary literature

- Bjork, Robert E. (1998), "Cynewulf", in Paul E. Szarmach; M. Teresa Tavormina; Joel T. Rosenthal (eds.), Medieval England: an Encyclopedia, Routledge Encyclopedias of the Middle Ages, vol. 3, New York: Garland, pp. 227–9, ISBN 9780824057862.
- Brady, Lindy (2010), "Echoes of Britons on a Fenland Frontier in the Old English Andreas", The Review of English Studies, 61 (252): 669–689, doi:10.1093/res/hgq047, ISSN 0034-6551
- Cameron, Angus (1982), "Anglo-Saxon Literature", Dictionary of the Middle Ages, vol. 1, translated by Joseph R. Strayer (9th ed.), American Council of Learned Societies, pp. 279, 287–8, ISBN 9780684190730.
- Clemoes, P., ed. (1997), Ælfric's Catholic Homilies. The First Series, EETS, supplemental, vol. 17, Oxford: Oxford UP, ISBN 9780197224182.
- Fulk, R. D.; Bjork, Robert E.; Niles, John D., eds. (2008), Klaeber's Beowulf (4th ed.), Toronto: University of Toronto Press, ISBN 9780802098436.
- Riedinger, Anita R. (1998), "Andreas", in Paul E. Szarmach; M. Teresa Tavormina; Joel T. Rosenthal (eds.), Medieval England: an Encyclopedia, Routledge Encyclopedias of the Middle Ages, vol. 3, New York: Garland, pp. 33–4, ISBN 9780824057862.
- Scragg, Donald (1999), "Andreas", in Michael Lapidge (ed.), The Blackwell Encyclopedia of Anglo-Saxon England, Malden, Massachusetts: Blackwell Ltd, p. 32, ISBN 9780631224921.
- Scragg, D.G. (1998), "Vercelli Book", in Paul E. Szarmach; M. Teresa Tavormina; Joel T. Rosenthal (eds.), Medieval England: an Encyclopedia, Routledge Encyclopedias of the Middle Ages, vol. 3, New York: Garland, p. 755, ISBN 9780824057862.
- Thurston, Herbert (1908), "Cynewulf", The Catholic Encyclopedia, translated by Paul Knutsen.
- Walsh, Mary (1981), "St. Andrew in Anglo-Saxon England: The Evolution of an Apocryphal Hero", Annuale Mediavale, 20: 97–122, OCLC 191706935.
