= Juliana of Nicomedia =

Anatolian Christian saint (d. c. 304)

Saint Juliana of Nicomedia
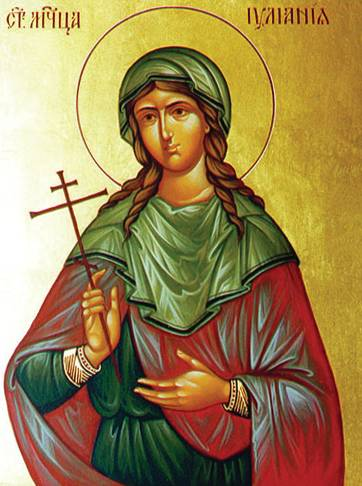

Virgin and Martyr
- Born: c. 285 AD; Cumae (modern-day Naples, Italy)
- Died: c. 304 AD; Nicomedia or Naples (modern-day İzmit, Turkey or Naples, Italy)
- Venerated in: Roman Catholic Church; Eastern Orthodox Church; Oriental Orthodoxy
- Feast: February 16 (Roman Catholic Church); December 21 (Eastern Orthodox Church)
- Attributes: Represented with a winged devil led by a chain; shown enduring various tortures or fighting a dragon
- Patronage: sickness

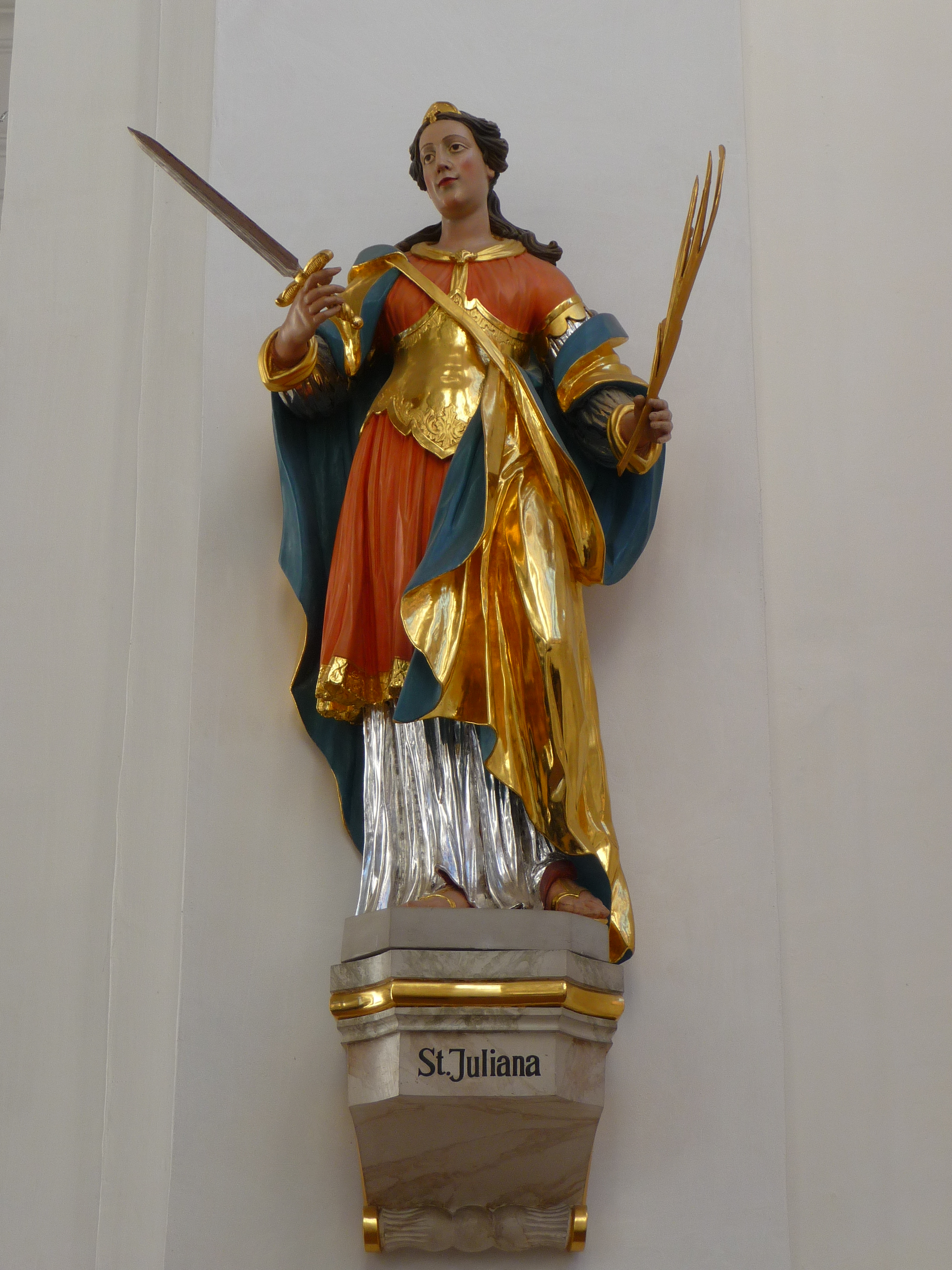
Statue of St. Juliana in Jesuit church in Heidelberg, Germany

Juliana of Nicomedia (Greek: Ίουλιανή Νικομηδείας) is an Anatolian Christian saint, said to have been born in 285 AD and suffered martyrdom during the Diocletianic persecution in 304. She was popular as a patron saint of the sick during the Middle Ages, especially in the Netherlands.

== Historical background ==
Both the Latin and Greek Churches mention a holy martyr Juliana in their lists of saints. The oldest historical notice of her is found in the Martyrologium Hieronymianum for 16 February, her place of birth being given as Cumae in Campania (In Campania Cumbas, Natale Julianae).

The only reference to Juliana is in the Codex Epternacensis. That it is nevertheless authentic seems upheld by a letter of Saint Gregory the Great, which testifies to the special veneration of Saint Juliana in the neighbourhood of Naples. A pious matron named Januaria had built an oratory on one of her estates, and for its consecration, she sought relics (sanctuaria, that is to say, objects which had been brought into contact with the graves) of Saints Severin and Juliana. Gregory wrote to Fortunatus II, Bishop of Naples, telling him to accede to the wishes of Januaria. Her life is listed in the Bibliotheca Hagiographica Graeca (BHG) 963 and Bibliotheca Hagiographica Latina (BHL) 4522–4527.

== Two martyrs? ==
Sometime after Juliana's martyrdom, a noble lady named Sephora travelled through Nicomedia and took a martyr's body with her to Italy to be buried in Campania. It then seems reverence paid to another Juliana, honoured in Nicomedia, might have become conflated with that due to the Juliana who suffered at Cumae.

Little that is satisfactory has survived of the accounts, respectively, of two quite distinct persons.

== The legend ==
Details of her biography are unclear. The Acts of Saint Juliana used by Bede in his "Martyrologium" may be legendary. According to this account, Saint Juliana, daughter of an illustrious pagan named Africanus, was born in Nicomedia; and as a child was betrothed to the Senator Eleusius, one of the emperor's advisors. Her father was hostile to the Christians. However, while keeping this to herself, Juliana had been baptised as a Christian. When the time of her wedding approached, Juliana refused to be married. Her father urged her not to break her engagement, but when she refused to obey him, he handed her over to the Governor, her former fiancé. Once more, Eleusius asked Juliana to marry him, but she again refused.

Juliana was beheaded after suffering torture in 304, during the persecution of Maximian. It is said that her torture included being partially burned in flames and plunged into a boiling pot of oil, before finally being beheaded. Along with Juliana, another Christian named Saint Barbara suffered martyrdom, to be likewise venerated as a saint.

== Alternative narrative ==
Juliana's parents, who were pagans, wanted to betroth her to Eleusius, a prominent officer from Antioch. However, Juliana strongly resisted, leaving her parents surprised, as she had always been an obedient daughter who never opposed them.

It is said Eleusius' dignity was sorely dented. Nursing this grievance, he made enquiries. He discovered that Juliana had converted to Christianity, unbeknownst to either parent. Eleusius accused her before the Roman governor, leading to her arrest and imprisonment. While in prison, efforts to make Juliana the wife of Eleusius continued, to save her from execution. However, she preferred to die rather than take a pagan as her husband. The story continues that Eleusius, filled with hate and on orders from the Roman governor, ruthlessly flogged her. After that, he burned her face with a heated iron and said, "Go now to the mirror to see your beauty". At this, Juliana is said to have answered with a light smile: "At the resurrection of the righteous, there will not be burnings and wounds but only the soul. So Eleusius, I prefer to have now the wounds of the body which are temporary, rather than wounds of the soul which torture eternally." Juliana was eventually beheaded.

By this account, Eleusius was later eaten by a lion after a shipwreck on an island unknown.

== Later history ==
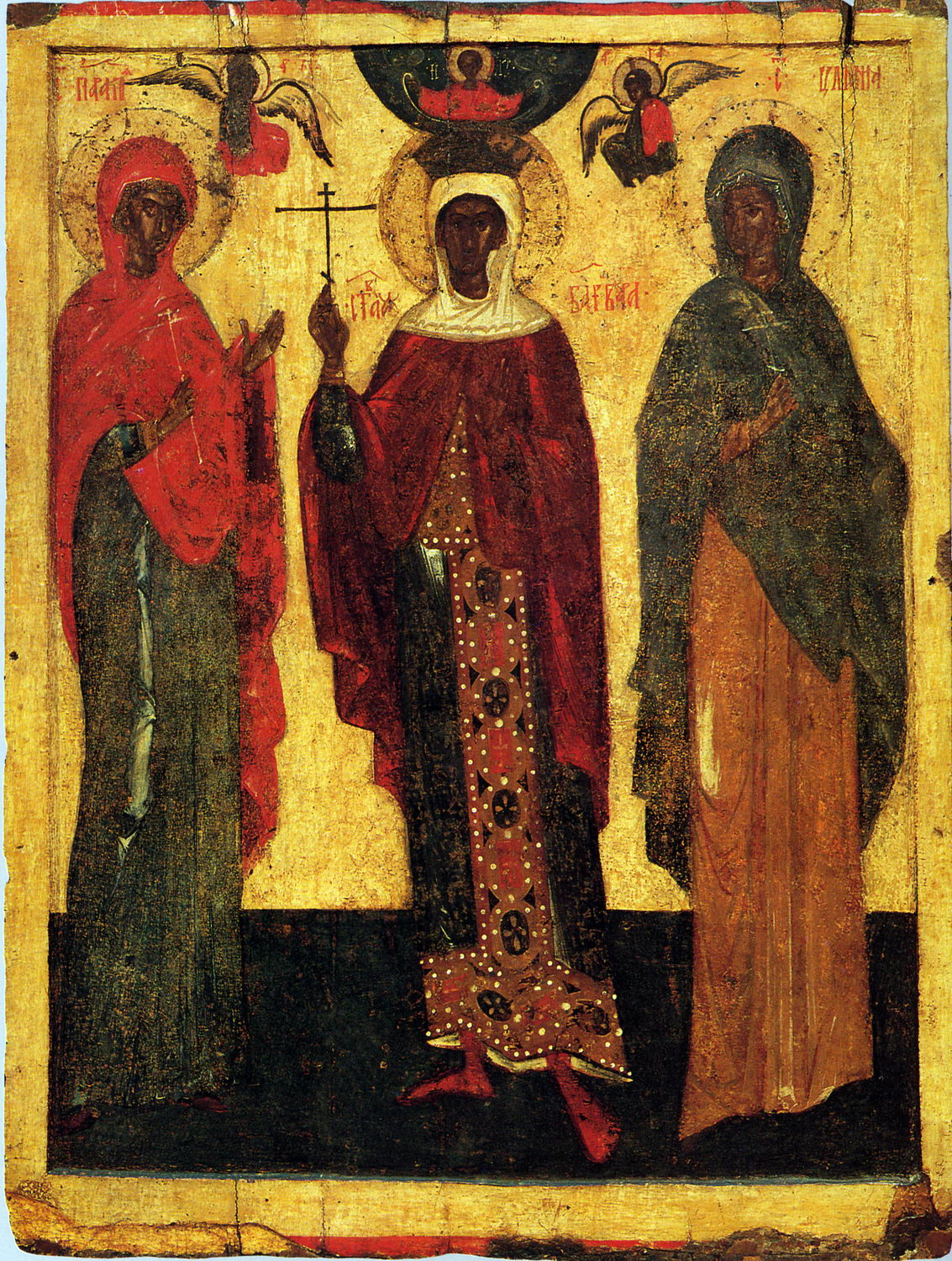
An icon depicting Saints Paraskevi of Iconium, Barbara and Juliana.

Devotion to Saint Juliana of Nicomedia became very widespread, persisting especially in the Netherlands. She became known as the patron saint of the sick.

Early in the 13th century, her remains were transferred to Naples. The description of this translation by a contemporary writer is still extant.

== Veneration ==
The feast of the saint is celebrated in the Catholic Church on 16 February; and in the Greek Orthodox Church on 21 December.

Since her Acts describe her conflicts with Satan, she is often depicted with a winged devil whom she leads by a chain. Other images show her enduring various tortures. In the church of St Mary in Martham there is a medieval stained-glass depiction. In the church of St Andrew at Hempstead, near Holt, Norfolk, her effigy appears on a medieval rood screen. The church of St Mary at North Elmham contains an image of St Juliana on the rood screen.

St. Juliana is the subject of the Old English poem "Juliana," attributed to Cynewulf because of his runic signature in the epilogue. This features an extended dialogue between Juliana and the demon she restrained.

== See also ==
- Saint Juliana of Nicomedia, patron saint archive

== Sources ==
- Mombritius, Sanctuarium, II, fol. 41 v.-43 v.;
- Acta SS., FEB., II, 808 sqq.;
- J. P. Migne, P.G. CXIV, 1437–52;
- Bibliotheca Hagiographica Latina, I, 670 sq.; Bibl. hagiogr. graeca (2nd. ed.), 134;
- Nilles, Kalendarium manuale, I (2nd ed., Innsbruck, 1896), 359;
- Mazocchi, In vetus S. Neapolitanae ecclesiae Kalendarum commentarius, I (Naples, 1744), 556–9;
- Oswald Cockayne, St. Juliana (London, 1872)
- Vita di S. Giuliana (Novara, 1889);
- Oskar Backhaus, Ueber die Quelle der mittelenglischen Legende der hl. Juliana und ihr Verhaltnis zu Cynewulfs Juliana (Halle, 1899).
