= Vercelli homilies =

Collection of prose entries within the Vercelli book

The Vercelli homilies are a collection of twenty-three prose entries within the Vercelli Book. Little is known about the exact authorship of the Vercelli homilies. It is widely believed that the individual homilies were gathered from several authors and copied by one scribe into the manuscript at random. The compilation of theVercelli Book is typically placed within the late tenth century AD.

== Placement and importance within the Vercelli book ==
Though the Vercelli book contains, in addition to the homilies, six items written in verse, there seems to be little evidence of an overarching thought structure behind the arrangement of the items within the manuscript. The six verse items, rather than being separated from the prose homilies, are interspersed throughout, demonstrating little intentional differentiation between the prose and verse items of the manuscript. In keeping with the tradition of most Old English vernacular homilies, very little of the material within the Vercelli homilies appears to be original; the vast majority was most likely compiled by the Vercelli scribe from a single library over an extended period of time. Many of the homilies, moreover, were translated very awkwardly into Old English from the original Latin, offering, in some cases, some difficult sections wherein the Old English seems to be based around flawed Latin translation. In fact, the few Latin quotations that appear throughout the homilies suggest that the Vercelli scribe had no training whatsoever in the language.

== Subject matter and style ==
Though the homilies seem to have been gathered piecemeal with little concern for their relation to each other, there do seem to be connections between certain of the homilies. Homilies VI through X constitute a numbered series; XI through XIV seem to share a similar method of rubrication; the nineteenth, twentieth, and twenty-first homilies are, most likely, by the same author. Additionally, the time origins of the homilies differ greatly. The first, second, and arguably third homilies seem to fit into the homiletic tradition of the early tenth century, making them the oldest prose within the Vercelli book; on the other hand, homilies XIX through XXI were most likely written very shortly before the collection of the Vercelli materials.

The subject matter of the homilies also differs considerably from example to example. The majority of the homilies are drawn from the period’s dominant Christian tradition. Homilies II, III, IV, VII, IX, X, XIV, XV, and XXII are eschatological in nature; common themes throughout this broad category of the homilies include descriptions of the End of the World and pleas for repentance in the face of impending judgment. This emphasis on judgment appears elsewhere within the homilies; homilies XI through XIII and XIX through XXI are both sets of three intended for the days leading into Ascension Day as a preparation for, on the third day, meeting God. Relatively few of the homilies are explanatory in nature. Homily I is, in essence, a copy of the Gospel’s story of the Passion, as it offers little comment in addition to the biblical text. Homilies V and VI explain the story of Christmas, while XVI describes the Epiphany and XVII Candlemas. Homilies XVIII and XXIII are the lives of Saints Martin and Guthlac respectively. Homily XXII resists some efforts to classify, as it is more of a spiritual contemplation exploring the fate of the soul after death than a typical homily.

The manner of transposition of the homilies differs greatly through the manuscript. As mentioned, many of the homilies are tied intrinsically to their original Latin, and rarely depart from a very textbook translation into Old English. Others appear to have been merely lifted verbatim from other vernacular texts; homily XXI, for instance, contains a word for word copy of parts of an early version of homily II. On the other hand, certain homilies seem to benefit from a very loose association with the original source material, and have been translated freely into Old English. Homily X has been especially praised as a “highly sophisticated creation” that “shows the application of a shrewd mind, one that can express ideas in highly wrought and beautiful language” (D.G. Scragg). Once again, however, it must be emphasized that the author of homily X, and the authors of all the homilies in general, are unknown, and were uninvolved in the inclusion of the homilies in the Vercelli Book.

== Linguistic characteristics of the homilies ==
Despite certain limited reliance on Latin translations and quotations throughout the homilies, they remain an essential example of Old English prose writing. For the most part, the homilies appear in the late West Saxon dialect, but also incorporate several interesting departures from the form mandated by this dialect. To a certain extent, this may be attributable to the mechanical copying of the Vercelli scribe, but this seems to be an extremely limited possibility, given the breadth of differentiation. D.G. Scragg, the premier Vercelli scholar, follows unique instances of earlier or non-West Saxon spellings for words, and suggests that this may be due to the vast expanse of time from which the writings were pooled, and the fluid nature of Old English spellings.

== Sources ==
- Scragg, D.G. “Homilies” from The Blackwell Encyclopedia of Anglo-Saxon England (1992). Ed. M. Lapidge
- Scragg, D.G. “Vercelli Book” from Medieval England: An encyclopedia (1998). Ed. P. Szarmach, et al.
- Scragg, D.G. “Vercelli Homilies” from Medieval England: An encyclopedia (1998). Ed. P. Szarmach, et al.
- Scragg, D.G. (1992) The Vercelli homilies. Oxford University Press; New York.
