= Vercelli Book =

Manuscript Old English poetic codex

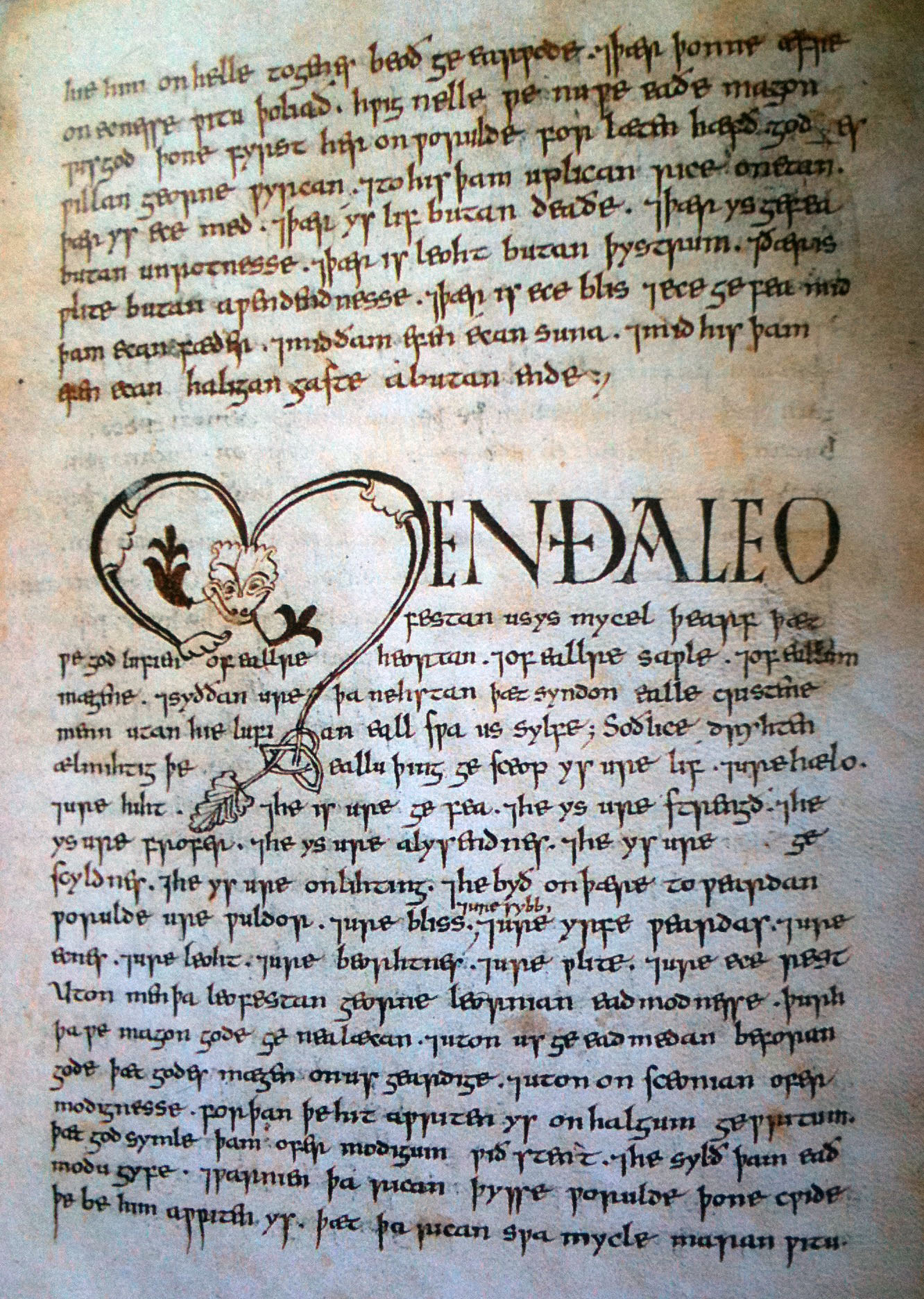
Vercelli Book

The Vercelli Book is one of the oldest of the four Old English Poetic Codices (the others being the Junius manuscript in the Bodleian Library, the Exeter Book in Exeter Cathedral Library, and the Nowell Codex in the British Library). It is an anthology of Old English prose and verse that dates back to the late 10th century. The manuscript is housed in the Capitulary Library of Vercelli, in northern Italy.

== Contents ==
The Vercelli Book consists of 135 folios, and although the manuscript was probably compiled and written in the late 10th century, not all of the texts found in the manuscript were originally written at that time. The poems ascribed to Cynewulf (The Fates of the Apostles and Elene) could have been created much earlier. The Vercelli Book contains 23 prose homilies (the Vercelli Homilies) and a prose vita of Saint Guthlac, interspersed with six poems:

- Andreas
- The Fates of the Apostles
- Soul and Body
- The Dream of the Rood
- Elene
- a fragment of a homiletic poem

== History ==
The book is a parchment manuscript of the end of the tenth century, containing a miscellany, or florilegium, of religious texts that were apparently selected for private inspiration. The meticulous hand is Anglo-Saxon square minuscule. It was found in the library by Friedrich Blume, in 1822, and was first described in his Iter Italicum (Stettin, 4 vols., 1824–36). The presence of the volume was explained by a hospice catering especially to English pilgrims that was founded by Jacopo Guala Bicchieri (d. 1227), bishop of Vercelli, who had been papal legate in England 1216–1218.

In the words of a modern critic, "The Vercelli Book appears ... to have been put together from a number of different exemplars with no apparent overall design in mind. The manner in which the scribe did the copying is relatively mechanical. In most cases, he copied the dialect and the manuscript punctuation that was found in the original texts, and these aspects therefore aid in reconstructing the variety of exemplars. The texts therefore range in date for although they were all copied in the later tenth century, they need not all have been written in this period".

The verse items occur in three randomly placed groups intermixed with prose. Evidence suggests that the scribe may have assembled the material over an extended period of time. Elaine Treharne in Old and Middle English: An Anthology suggests: "Although the examples are diverse, and no apparent chronological or formal arrangement can be discerned, the texts suggest the compiler was someone in a monastic setting who wished to illustrate his personal interest in penitential and eschatological themes and to glorify the ascetic way of life. The homilies represent part of the anonymous tradition of religious prose writing in Anglo Saxon England".

In his book The Vercelli Homilies, Donald Scragg claims that because of the poetry, the Vercelli Book "is in no sense a homiliary". He argues that most of the homilies in the Vercelli Book are sermons with general themes, while two of the homilies describe lives of the saints (XVII and XXIII). The manuscript contains two homilies (I and VI) that are primarily narrative pieces and lack the typical homiletic structure. The arrangement of the homilies, coupled with the placement of the poetic pieces, creates a manuscript which Scragg considers to be "one of the most important vernacular books to survive from the pre-Conquest period". None of the homilies can be precisely dated, nor can any be assigned to a specific author.

=== Editions ===
Blume reported his find to German historian Johann Martin Lappenberg, who in turn wrote to the British antiquary Charles Purton Cooper. Blume did not, as was earlier thought, transcribe the manuscript himself. Rather, Cooper, on behalf of the British Record Commission, commissioned Dr. C. Maier of the University of Tübingen to make a transcript, which he did in 1834. This copy was the basis for Benjamin Thorpe's putative edition, "well advanced" by 1835 but never published (the Record Commission was dissolved in 1837). Copies of his work were kept and distributed between 1869 and 1917, though some copies must have been sent out: one such copy was the basis for Jacob Grimm's Andreas und Elene (Kassel, 1840), an edition of the Old English poems Andreas and Elene, both found in the Vercelli Book. In turn, John Mitchell Kemble partly based his Poetry of the Codex Vercellensis (London, 1856) on Grimm's edition; Maier's transcript was also the basis for C. W. M. Grein's critical edition in Bibliothek der angelsächsischen Poesie (Göttingen, 1858, rev. Leipzig, 1894). Given Vercelli's remote location (across the Alps for German and English scholars), Maier's was the only available transcription for decades; Julius Zupitza's 1877 edition was the first one based on a new inspection of the manuscript.

- The majority of Vercelli Book poems are edited along with digital images of their manuscript pages, and translated, in the Old English Poetry in Facsimile Project, Martin Foys et al. (eds.) (University of Wisconsin-Madison (2019-)).
