= Soul and Body =

Two anonymous Old English poems

Soul and Body refers to two anonymous Old English poems: Soul and Body I, which is found in the Vercelli Book, and Soul and Body II, found in the Exeter Book. It is one of the oldest poems to have survived in two manuscripts of Old English, each version slightly different from the other. Despite their differences (in structure and length, for example), the Soul and Body poems address similar themes. Both versions ask the committed and penitent Christian reader to call to mind his bodily actions on earth in relation to his soul's afterlife. A sense of exigency is found in the poems, imploring the body to live according to the soul's fate and not the desires of the flesh.

== The manuscripts ==
The two versions of Soul and Body are found in two separate poetry collections. The first is found in the Vercelli manuscript, and is entitled, by modern scholars, Soul and Body I. The other is found in the Exeter manuscript, and is entitled, also by modern scholars, Soul and Body II. Soul and Body I differs from the Exeter version, in that, following the damned soul's address is a parallel address from a blessed soul to its body. Soul and Body II ends after The Damned Soul's address, which consists of 126 lines of verse. Soul and Body I, however, continues with what remains of The Blessed Soul's address, another 40 lines of verse. The Vercelli manuscript seems to be missing several pages and, as a result, The Blessed Soul's address breaks off at line 166 with the word 'þisses'.

While the Vercelli version is incomplete, it has been suggested that not much of the poem has been lost (Smetana 195). In Soul and Body I, The Damned Soul's address takes up 85 lines, while The Blessed Soul's address is a mere 31 lines. However, this is not unusual: other works comprising the body-and-soul theme tend to focus more on the damned soul than the blessed soul, with some homilies devoting more than twice the space to the damned soul (Frantzen 84). As is typical, the details of the body's decay are deemphasized in The Blessed Soul's address, which is what makes up the bulk of The Damned Soul's address. Based on these facts, scholars can reasonably assume that the poem is nearly complete.

However, it is worth noting that several scholars argue that The Blessed Soul's address is an inferior, later addition by another poet. Peter R. Orton points to lapses in metrical structure and inconsistencies in spelling and punctuation to support this argument. In addition, Douglas Moffat notes that it seems strange that the poet brought the first half of a two-part poem to a fitting conclusion before moving on to the next part, instead of "saving summary comments for the conclusion of the whole" (44). Nevertheless, there is not enough evidence to prove whether The Blessed Soul is a later addition.

As for Soul and Body II, S.A.J. Bradley argues that, "[Soul and Body II's] position in the Exeter Book is in a group of poems of wisdom, lore and intelligent conceits" (358). Moreover, Soul and Body II is comparable with other like-poems found in the Exeter manuscript such as Deor, and Wulf and Eadwacer.

== Place and time ==
The author or poet of Soul and Body is unknown; however, as Michael Lapidge points out "several aspects of the poems' eschatology show signs of Irish influence," most significantly the overtly Christian reference to the soul's disapproval of its body's actions, as well as the ultimate destiny for mankind and his soul (425). Thomas D. Hill has come across two passages that support the theory of Irish influence, in reference to the soul's claim that the body will pay for its sins according to each of its 365 joints. The first is from "The Old Irish Table of Penitential Commutations," which states the requirements for rescuing a soul from hell: 365 Paters, 365 genuflections, 65 "blows of the scourge every day for a year, and a fast every month," which "is in proportion to the number of joints and sinews in the human body" (410). Although Hill admits the passage is problematic, it does seem to support the idea that the torment awaiting the damned body will be proportional to its 365 joints. The second is from the medieval Irish version of the Fifteen Tokens of Doomsday, which lists various torments of Hell. The ninth torment states that "locks and fiery bonds" will blaze on "every member and on every separate joint of the sinners" because "in life they did not control those members by penance and by the cross of repentance..." (264). This second passage, Hill states, "provides an Irish instance of 'punishment according to the joints' in an explicitly eschatological context as in the Old English poem" (246).

Furthermore, the language of the poem is West Saxon in nature, and lends itself to an "Irish-influenced Mercian literary school" of thought, or the common thought found in the kingdom of Mercia, one of the ancient, Anglo-Saxon kingdoms found in what is now Great Britain (Lapidge 426). Based on language patterns and thematic elements, Soul and Body was most likely copied in the late 9th or early 10th century, "plausibly during the reign of Æthelstan."

== Summary of the poem ==
Soul and Body is a poem in which the soul addresses its body. It is clear, as Moffat notes, that there is an identifiable first-person speaker throughout the entire poem; the speaker is the damned soul or the saved soul who is addressing his respective earthly body. In Soul and Body II, or The Damned Soul's address in Soul and Body I, the soul has a strong "contempt for the rotting corpse" from which it came (Frantzen 77). The body-and-soul theme, which dates back to the early Christian era, is meant to remind readers what will happen to their soul should they choose to neglect their obligations to God. The soul demands an answer from its body, because as the soul believes, the body is largely, if not completely, responsible for their shared, horrific fate (Ferguson 74). Despite the body being "dumb and deaf" (line 60), the soul reminds its body to plead its case before God at the Last Judgment.

Ironically, the body's silence only emphasizes its harsh reality; the body will not be able to speak with God in the final days because of its sinful behavior while alive on earth. Not once, but twice does the soul chastise its body for its "firenlustas" (lines 31 and 41), or literally its "appetite for sin," specifically material wealth and earthly possessions (175). Furthermore, the efforts of the soul—and ultimately the reality of Christ's death and resurrection—have been in vain, since the body has perverted any chance of both the soul and the body enjoying eternal life in heaven. As one can see at the end of the poem, the Christian message of unity and judgment comes full circle, with the modern English translation stating "to every man among the wise this may serve as a reminder." Thus, Soul and Body II, or The Damned Soul's address in Soul and Body I, is the self-judgment of the soul and its condemnation of its body.

Soul and Body I then continues with The Blessed Soul's address, in which the saved soul praises the body for its mortification and thanks the body for all that it gave him. Although the soul laments that the body cannot experience all the joys of heaven at the moment, he reminds him that they will be reunited at God's judgment, and then they will be able to enjoy whatever distinctions they receive in heaven.

== Religious overtones and their significance ==
Critical assessors of Soul and Body agree that the religious theme of the poem is quite obvious; the soul addresses its body in relation to the Final Judgment of both the soul and its body on the last day. The gruesome details of the damned body's state are reminiscent of the medical metaphor, which compares sins to wounds or disease and penance and confession to a cure. For this very reason, the details of the body's decay are passed over in The Blessed Soul's address. While a body must decay, the body of the saved soul already did his penance.

Penance in this poem is defined by the practice of fasting. Both the damned soul and the blessed soul imply that the body either did or did not fast. In the former, the soul accuses:

Wære þu þe wiste wlanc ond wines sæd,
þrymful þunedest ond ic ofþyrsted wæs
godes lichoman gastes drynces.

—lines 39–41
Translation:

You, who were proud of dining and sated with wine,
you boasted majestically, and I thirsted for
the body of God, for the drink of the spirit.

The body ignored the soul's need for the body and blood of God, i.e. the Eucharist, and indulged in earthly pleasures.

Furthermore, because the damned soul reproaches its body for not repenting, the poem seems to suggest that the body is in control, which goes against traditional beliefs of the soul's superiority. Smetana and other scholars have questioned the unorthodoxy of the theology used in the poem, with some charging the poem with dualism (i.e., the inherent evil of the flesh). However, Frantzen reassesses this apparent inversion of the soul and body hierarchy, arguing that the poem does, in fact, follow normative Christian beliefs because its focus is not on theology, but penitential practice. He states that, while the soul may will repentance, "the body must bear the burden of mortification; if the body does penance it becomes the soul's 'lord' and 'protector' because it ensures the soul's bliss in eternity; and, conversely, if the body refuses to do penance it becomes a tyrant who destroys their union ... and ensures the soul's misery in hell" (Frantzen 81).

Additionally, Frantzen points to the homilies of Aelfric and handbooks of penance to illustrate that Soul and Body has much in common with the pastoral teachings of the late Anglo-Saxon period (85). As such, early Christian audiences were very familiar with these themes; the imagery would have had strong implications for them (Ferguson 79).

== See also ==
- The Debate Between a Man and his Soul, Egyptian Middle Kingdom text
