= Joel T. Rosenthal =

Historian and author

Joel T. Rosenthal is a medieval historian and the author of several scholarly books and articles. He is Distinguished professor and Emeritus of History at the State University of New York in Stony Brook. He is a fellow of the Medieval Academy of America and the Royal Historical Society. He gained his doctorate in 1963 from the University of Chicago—where he took seminars under Eleanora Carus-Wilson—with a dissertation on Richard, 3rd Duke of York.

Rosenthal's particular interests and specialisms have varied over his career, but have been generally on English social history, including aspects such as noble family life—including women and children—old age, widows, religion, and English personal names. Interests outside and beyond both England and the Late Middle Ages have focused on Anglo-Saxons, Capetians, and pedagogy. He has co-edited books—for example, the Garland Encyclopedia of Medieval England—as well as journals, such as Medieval Prosopography.

== Significant works ==
For a complete chronology of Rosenthal's publications, see Christine Fox's 2018 bibliography.

- The Purchase of Paradise: Gift Giving and the Aristocracy, 1307–1485: London: Routledge and Kegan Paul, 1972.
- Angles, Angels, and Conquerors: New York: Random House, 1973.
- Nobles and the Noble Life, 1295–1500: London: Allen and Unwin; New York: Barnes and Noble, 1976.
- Anglo-Saxon History: An Annotated Bibliography, 450–1066: New York: Abrahams Magazine Services Press, 1985.
- Patriarchy and Families of Privilege in Fifteenth-Century England: Philadelphia: University of Pennsylvania Press, 1991.
- Old Age in Late Medieval England: Philadelphia: University of Pennsylvania Press, 1996.
- Telling Tales: Sources and Narration in Late Medieval England: University Park, PA: Pennsylvania State University Press, 2003.
- From the Ground Up: A History of the State University of New York at Stony Brook: New York: 116 Press, 2004.
- Margaret Paston, Matriarch of the Paston Family: Dereham, UK: Larks Press, 2009.
- Margaret Paston’s Piety: New York: Palgrave Macmillan, 2010.
- Christianity and the Church in Post-Conquest England: New York: Oxford University Press, 2010.
