= Cynewulf =

Old English poet

Cynewulf (/ˈkɪniwʊlf/, Old English: [ˈkynewuɫf]; also spelled Cynwulf or Kynewulf) is one of twelve Old English poets known by name, and one of four whose work is known to survive today. He presumably flourished in the 9th century, with possible dates extending into the late 8th and early 10th centuries.

Cynewulf is a well-attested Anglo-Saxon given name derived from cyne "royal, of a king" and wulf "wolf".

Known for his religious compositions, Cynewulf is regarded as one of the pre-eminent figures of Anglo-Saxon Christian poetry. Posterity knows of his name by means of runic signatures that are interwoven into the four poems which comprise his scholastically recognized corpus. These poems are: The Fates of the Apostles, Juliana, Elene, and Christ II (also referred to as The Ascension).

The four signed poems of Cynewulf are vast in that they collectively comprise several thousand lines of verse. In comparison, the one work attributed to Cædmon, Cædmon's Hymn, is quite succinct at nine lines.

== Life ==
=== Dialect ===
Some basic statements can be made by examining such aspects as the spellings of his name and his verse. Although the Vercelli and Exeter manuscripts were primarily late West Saxon in their scribal translations, it is most probable that Cynewulf wrote in the Anglian dialect and it follows that he resided either in the province of Northumbria or Mercia.

This is shown through linguistic and metrical analysis of his poems (e.g., Elene), where in the poem's epilogue (beginning l.1236) the imperfect rhymes become corrected when Anglian forms of the words are substituted for the West Saxon forms. For instance, the manuscript presents the miht:peaht false rhyme which can be corrected when the middle vowel sounds of both words are replaced with an [æ] sound. The new maeht:paeht rhyme shows a typical Anglian smoothing of the ⟨ea⟩. Numerous other "Anglianisms" in Elene and Juliana have been taken to be indicative of an original Anglian dialect underlying the West Saxon translation of the texts. Any definite conclusion to Cynewulf being either Northumbrian or Mercian has been hard to come by, but linguistic evidence suggests that the medial ⟨e⟩ in the signed Cynewulf would have, during the broad window period of Cynewulf's existence, been characteristic of a Mercian dialect.

=== Date ===
All the evidence considered, no exact deduction of Cynewulf's date is accepted, but it is likely he flourished in the ninth century.

A firm terminus ante quem that can be put on the date of Cynewulf are the dates of the Vercelli and Exeter manuscripts, which are approximately in the second half of the tenth century. Other than that, no certain date can be put on the author, leaving open the full range of Old English literature between the 7th and the early 10th centuries. Any attempt to link the man with a documented historical figure has met failure or resulted in an improbable connection. However, the presence of early West Saxon forms in both manuscripts means that it is possible an Alfredian scribe initially translated Cynewulf's verse, placing him no later than the turn of the tenth century.

A tentative terminus post quem is based on the two textual variations of Cynewulf's name, Cynewulf and Cynwulf. The older spelling of the name was Cyniwulf, and Sisam points out that the ⟨i⟩ tends to change to an ⟨e⟩ about the middle of the eighth century, and the general use of the ⟨i⟩ phases itself out by the end of the century, suggesting Cynewulf cannot be dated much before the year 800. Moreover, it has been argued that the "cult of the cross", which can find ground in Cynewulf's Elene, achieved its cultural apex in the eighth century. Also deserving consideration is the argument that the acrostic was most fashionable in ninth century poetry and Cynewulf's own acrostic signature would have followed the trend during this time.

=== Identity ===
Cynewulf was without question a literate and educated man, since there is no other way we can "account for the ripeness which he displays in his poetry". Given the subject matter of his poetry he was likely a man in holy orders, and the deep Christian knowledge conveyed through his verse implies that he was well learned in ecclesiastical and hagiographical literature, as well as the dogma and doctrine of the Catholic Church. His apparent reliance on Latin sources for inspiration means he knew the Latin language, and this of course would correlate with him being a man of the Church.

Cynewulf of Lindisfarne (d. c. 780) is a plausible candidate for Cynewulf the poet, based on the argument that the poet's elaborate religious pieces must lend themselves to "the scholarship and faith of the professional ecclesiastic speaking with authority", but this conclusion is not universally accepted. Alternative suggestions for the poet's identity include Cynwulf, a Dunwich priest (fl. 803), and Cenwulf, Abbot of Peterborough (d. 1006).

=== Views on poetry ===
In his Christ II, Cynewulf wrote:

Then he who created this world ... honoured us and gave us gifts ... and also sowed and set in the mind of men many kinds of wisdom of heart. One he allows to remember wise poems, sends him a noble understanding, through the spirit of his mouth. The man whose mind has been given the art of wisdom can say and sing all kinds of things.

Likewise, Cynewulf's autobiographical reflection in the epilogue of Elene claims that his own skill in poetry comes directly from God, who "unlocked the art of poesy" within him. Cynewulf seems to have justified his poetic endeavours through a philosophy in which poetry was "associated with wisdom".

== Works ==
Following the studies of S. K. Das (1942) and Claes Schaar (1949), mainstream scholarship tends to limit Cynewulf's canon to the four poems which bear his acrostic mark: the Exeter Book holds Cynewulf's Juliana and Christ II (The Ascension) and the Vercelli Book his Elene and Fates of the Apostles.

Early scholars for a long while assigned a plethora of Old English pieces to Cynewulf on the basis that these pieces somewhat resembled the style of his signed poems. It was at one time plausible to believe that Cynewulf was author of the Riddles of the Exeter Book, the Phoenix, the Andreas, and the Guthlac; even famous unassigned poems such as the Dream of the Rood, the Harrowing of Hell, and the Physiologus have at one time been ascribed to him.

The four poems, like a substantial portion of Anglo-Saxon poetry, are sculpted in alliterative verse. All four poems draw upon Latin sources such as homilies and hagiographies (the lives of saints) for their content, and this is to be particularly contrasted to other Old English poems (e.g., Genesis, Exodus, and Daniel), which are drawn directly from the Bible as opposed to secondary accounts.

In terms of length, Elene is by far the longest poem of Cynewulf's corpus at 1,321 lines. It is followed by Juliana, at 731 lines, Christ II, at 427 lines, and The Fates of the Apostles, at a brisk 122 lines. Three of the poems are martyrological, in that the central character in each suffer or die for their religious values. In Elene, Saint Helena endures her quest to find the Holy Cross and spread Christianity; in Juliana, the title character dies after she refuses to marry a pagan man, thus retaining her Christian integrity; in Fates of the Apostles, the speaker creates a song that meditates on the deaths of the apostles which they "joyously faced".

Elene and Juliana fit in the category of poems that depict the lives of saints. These two poems, along with Andreas and Guthlac (parts A and B), constitute the only versified saints' legends in the Old English vernacular. The Ascension (Christ II) is outside the umbrella of the other three works and is a vehement description of a devotional subject.

The exact chronology of the poems is not known. One argument asserts that Elene is likely the last of the poems because the autobiographical epilogue implies that Cynewulf is old at the time of composition, but this view has been doubted. Nevertheless, it seems that Christ II and Elene represent the cusp of Cynewulf's career, while Juliana and Fates of the Apostles seem to be created by a less inspired, and perhaps less mature, poet.

== Runic signature ==
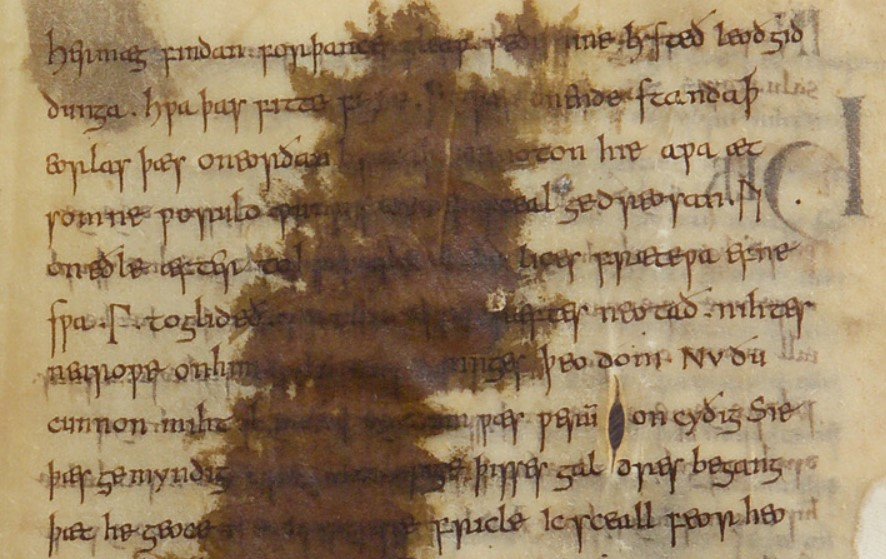
The end of The Fates of the Apostles in the Vercelli Book, with the spread runes spelling Cynewulf's name (f. 54r)

All four of Cynewulf's poems contain passages where the letters of the poet's name are woven into the text using runic symbols that also double as meaningful ideas pertinent to the text. In Juliana and Elene, the interwoven name is spelled in the more recognizable form as Cynewulf, while in Fates and Christ II it is observed without the medial e so the runic acrostic says Cynwulf.

Cynewulf anticipates cryptography, using the letters of his own name to make a poem about the Final Judgment. He says, "C and Y kneel in prayer; N sends up its supplications; E trusts in God; W and U know they will go to Heaven; L and F tremble." And this is written in Runic letters.

— Jorge Luis Borges

The practice of claiming authorship over one's poems was a break from the tradition of the anonymous poet, where no composition was viewed as being owned by its creator. Cynewulf devised a tradition where authorship would connote ownership of the piece and an originality that would be respected by future generations. Furthermore, by integrating his name, Cynewulf was attempting to retain the structure and form of his poetry that would undergo mutations otherwise. From a different perspective, Cynewulf's intent may not have been to claim authorship, but to "seek the prayers of others for the safety of his soul". It is contended that Cynewulf wished to be remembered in the prayers of his audience in return for the pleasure they would derive from his poems. In a sense his expectation of a spiritual reward can be contrasted with the material reward that other poets of his time would have expected for their craft.

== General references ==
- Bradley, S. A. J, ed. and tr. (1982). Anglo-Saxon Poetry, London: Everyman's Library
- Cook, Albert S., ed. (1900). The Christ of Cynewulf, Boston: Ginn And Company
- Fulk, R.D. and Christopher M. Cain (2003). A History of Old English Literature, Oxford: Blackwell Publishing
- Gradon, P. O. E., ed. (1958). Cynewulf's Elene, London: Methuen
- Greenfield, Stanley B. (1965). A Critical History of Old English Literature, New York: New York University Press
- Kennedy, Charles W. (1963). Early English Christian Poetry, New York: Oxford University Press
- Raw, Barabara C. (1978). The Art and Background of Old English Poetry, London: Edward Arnold
- Stokes, Peter A. (2006). "Cynewulf". The Literary Encyclopedia, The Literary Dictionary Company.
- Woolf, Rosemary, ed. (1955). Juliana, London: Methuen
- Zupitza, Julius (1899). Cynewulfs Elene. Berlin: Weidmannsche Buchhandlung.
