= Juliana (poem) =

Old English poem by Cynewulf

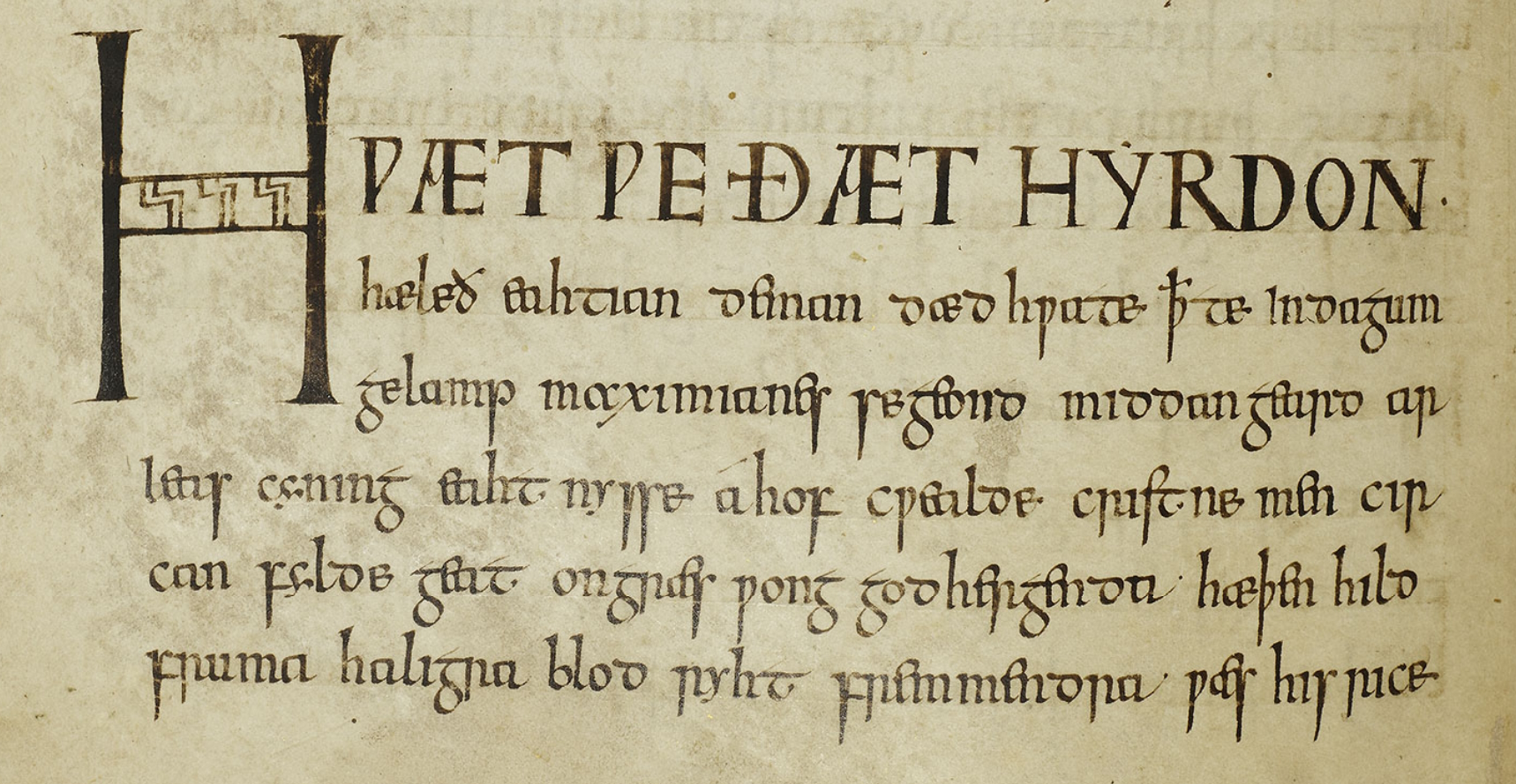
The first lines of the poem Juliana in the Exeter Book

"Juliana" (Exeter Book, fol. 65b–76a), is one of the four signed Old English poems ascribed to the mysterious poet, Cynewulf, and is an account of the martyring of St. Juliana of Nicomedia. The one surviving manuscript, dated between 970 and 990, is preserved in the Exeter Book between the poems The Phoenix and The Wanderer. Juliana is one of only five Old English poetic texts that describe the lives of saints. (The others include Elene, Andreas, and Guthlac A and B.)

Juliana is Cynewulf's second longest work, totaling 731 lines. However, due to damage to the Exeter Book over time—such as staining, charring, and the loss of pages---there are two gaps in the text of Juliana, amounting to a loss of 130 to 140 lines. Through comparative analyses, it has been determined that no more than a single page worth of material could be missing from either gap, and it is therefore very likely that a single sheet, which would have been folded in the middle to form two pages, was accidentally lost when the original manuscript was being bound.

Cynewulf's "Juliana" is presented entirely in Old English alliterative verse and is transmitted in a late West-Saxon dialect. Cynewulf likely derived the poem from earlier Latin accounts of the same story—similar to those appearing in the Acta sanctorum or the Martyrology; however, it is likely that Cynewulf was adapting his version from an unknown Latin source that has since been lost.

== Summary ==
The Juliana story takes place during the Diocletian persecution and was probably first set in writing during the rule of Constantine I. The story begins by illustrating the harsh life for Christians under the rule of Galerius Maximian, describing various acts of violence visited upon Christians. Juliana is introduced as the daughter of Africanus of Nicomedia, who has promised Juliana's hand in marriage to Eleusias, a wealthy senator and friend of Maximian. Although Juliana was born a pagan, she has converted to Christianity, and so she vehemently resists being married to the pagan Eleusias, not wanting to violate the relationship she shares with God.

When she publicly voices her dissatisfaction, Eleusias becomes outraged and insists that he has been publicly insulted. Africanus, upon hearing of this, becomes similarly outraged, believing his daughter has embarrassed him by refusing the hand of a man of much higher status. As a result, Africanus declares that Eleusias is free to punish Juliana in whatever way he wishes.

Eleusias proceeds to have Juliana stripped naked, hung from a tree by her hair, whipped, and beaten with rods for over two hours. Then she is thrown into prison.

While in prison, Juliana is visited by a demon pretending to be an angel of God, who tries to trick her into blasphemy. Juliana, being the epitome of unwavering Christian faith, does not fall for the charade and prays to God for guidance. A voice tells her to reach out and grab the demon, and Juliana obeys.

This point forward contains the bulk of the story, in which Juliana and the demon have a lengthy war of words, with Juliana clearly dominating. She holds the demon and forces it to confess all of its wicked deeds several times over, ostensibly humiliating him forever in the kingdom of Hell.

After her victory over the visiting demon, Eleusias comes back for Juliana and seems to offer her a chance to change her mind. Not surprisingly, Juliana refuses him once again, and just as scathingly as before.

Eleusias then attempts to have Juliana burned alive in hot lead. Yet, even though he has Juliana placed in the fire, not a spot on her body or clothes is touched by the flames. Angrier than ever, Eleusias finally resolves to have Juliana beheaded, for which she becomes a Christian martyr.

== Assessment ==
The entire story as told by Cynewulf deviates little from the Latin source he likely used, with the same “progress of action” and “phraseology” observed in both texts. However, there are some unsubtle differences worth mentioning. One is that the character of Eleusius is portrayed in Cynewulf's text with a much more sinister and intolerant manner to his behaviour. In the Acta Sanctorum, Eleusius is presented as an “easy-going man,” willing to accept Christianity just as long as he is not baptized: a practice that would compromise his position as a powerful senator.

In Cynewulf's version, however, Eleusias eagerly worships the heathen gods, and his faith in the “devil-inspired idols” is equitable to Juliana's faith in her own Christian God. Thus, Cynewulf polarizes Juliana and Eleusius in a way that is analogous to the conflict of good and evil. In fact, Cynewulf may have been trying to play on an Anglo-Saxon idea of a social construct called a dryht. The argument goes that, according to Anglo-Saxon ethos, a good king is a provider who earns the loyalty of those he governs. Cynewulf could have used this notion to illustrate a clear difference between Juliana's God (the “good king”) and Satan\pagan gods (the "bad king"). This is evident in the fact that Juliana is repeatedly guided and protected (with the one exception of the beheading) while the demon, an agent of Satan, is coerced into serving his master and is offered no guidance or protection.

A further difference to be noted between Cynewulf's Juliana and its counterpart in the Acta Sanctorum include the author's omission of Juliana's insistence that she will only marry Eleusius if he becomes a prefect. This was likely left out by Cynewulf to show Juliana as a polished saint and further magnify her polarization to Eleusius. There is also an important stylistic difference attributed to the adaptation efforts of Cynewulf; namely, the importing of military or battlefield language into the story. Although this is a recurring theme in both Latin and Old English literature, the military language does not appear in the Latin counterparts, such as the Acta Sanctorum, and so it is believed that Cynewulf probably wove it in for two possible reasons: the first being to make Juliana easier to relate to; the second, to create the metaphor that Juliana's spirit was a sort of impenetrable fortress, impervious to the attacks of Satan and his demonic henchmen.

It is said that Cynewulf's Juliana seems to lack the emotional vigour and imagination of some of the poet's other compositions. The language is thought to be “less elaborate,” but still maintains the rhetorical cunning that Cynewulf is accustomed to. As in his Elene, the Old English tradition of placing the characters and events of the story in a heroic setting is upheld; Juliana is celebrated as a martyr who defeats the advances of the devil. The idea of a woman figuring prominently in a tale such as this was not new to Anglo-Saxons. Germanic literature often permitted women to play instrumental roles in the heroic setting of events. For instance, through Bede's writings we hear of such women providing the stimulus for political and religious developments in Britain.

== Digital Facsimile Edition and Translation ==
- Foys, Martin; Smith, Aaryn, eds. (2022), Old English Poetry in Facsimile project (digital facsimile edition with modern English translation), Madison, WI: UW-Madison Center for the History of Print and Digital Culture.
