= The Fates of the Apostles =

Literature in alliterative verse

"The Fates of the Apostles" (Vercelli Book, fol. 52b–54a) is the shortest of Cynewulf’s known canon at 122 lines long. It is a brief martyrology of the Twelve Apostles written in the standard alliterative verse. The Fates recites the key events that subsequently befell each apostle after the Ascension of Jesus. It is possible that The Fates was composed as a learning aid to the monasteries.

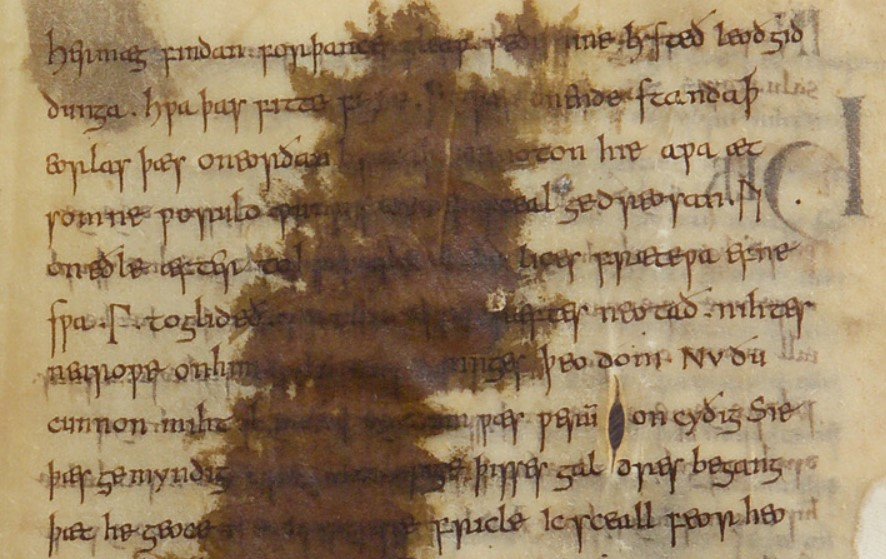
The end of The Fates of the Apostles in the Vercelli Book, with the spread runes spelling Cynewulf's name (f. 54r)

Cynewulf speaks in the first-person throughout the poem, and besides explaining the fate of each disciple, he provides “advice” and “consolation” to the reader. Cynewulf's runic signature is scrambled in this poem so that the meaning of the runes become a riddle with no unequivocal meaning.

"Wealth (F) shall be at it end there. Men enjoy this on earth, but not for ever will they be allowed to remain together :abiding in the world. The pleasure (W) which is ours (U) in this native place will fail and then the body’s borrowed fineries will crumble away, even as the sea (L) will vanish away when the fire (C) and trumpet (Y) exercise their strength in the straits of the night; coercion (N) will lie upon them—their thraldom to the King."
