= Christi =

Christi is a feminine given name. Notable people with the name include:

- Christi Belcourt (born 1966), Métis painter, craftsperson, and writer
- Christi Brereton (born 1992), English kickboxer and muay Thai fighter
- Christi Lake (born 1965), American pornographic actress
- Christi Malthouse (born 1976), Australian television personality
- Christi Paul (born 1969), American television journalist
- Christi Shake (born 1980), American model and actress
- Christi Thomas (born 1982), American basketball player

== See also ==
- Christ (disambiguation)
- Christa (disambiguation)
- Christe
- Christie (disambiguation)
- Christo (disambiguation)
- Christy (disambiguation)
- Cristi (name)
- Kristi (disambiguation)
