= Aurvandill =

Figure in Germanic mythology

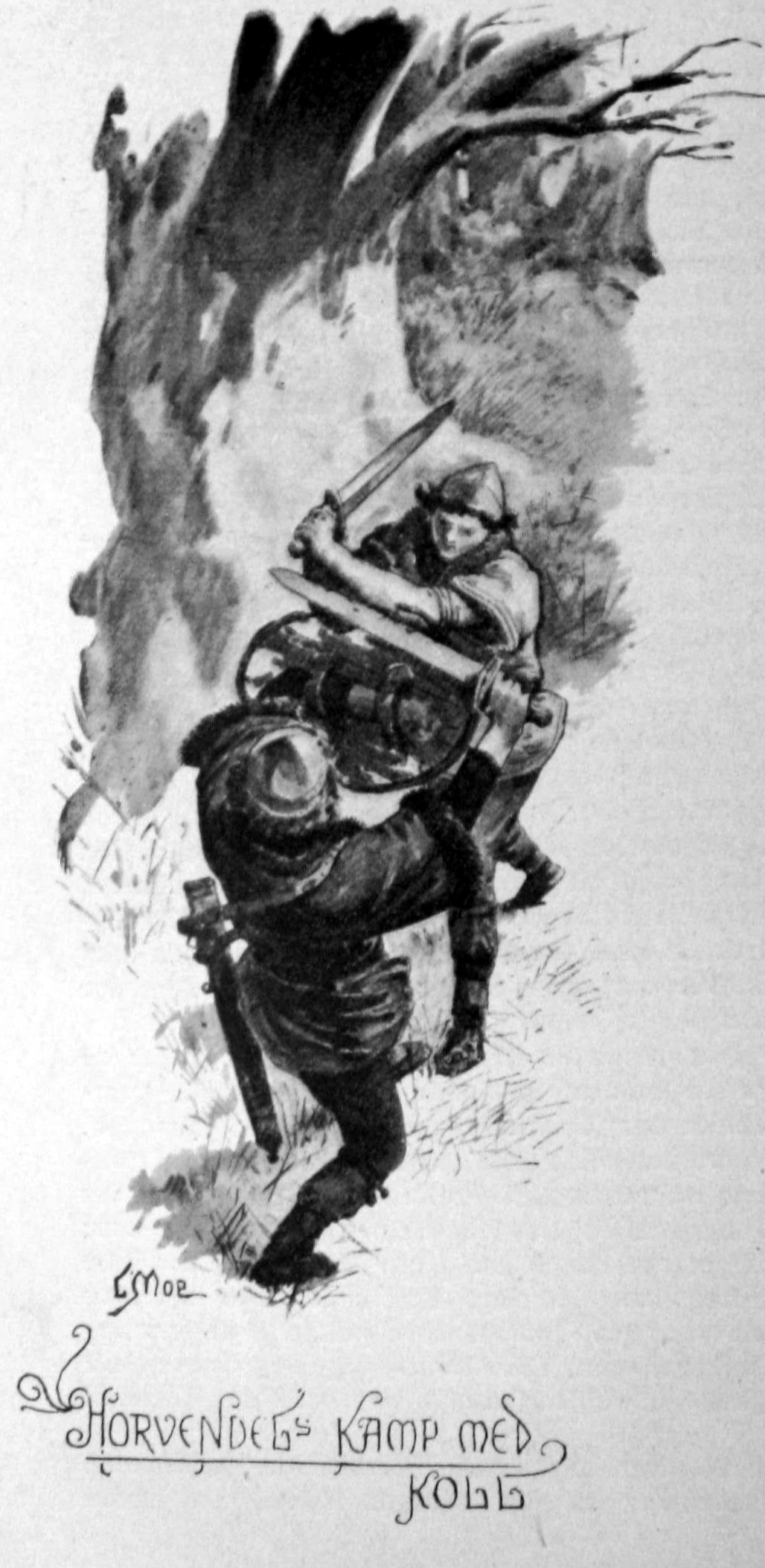
"For by his rain of blows he destroyed Koll's shield"

Aurvandill (Old Norse) is a figure in Germanic mythology. In Norse mythology, the god Thor tosses Aurvandill's toe – which had frozen while the thunder god was carrying him in a basket across the Élivágar rivers – into the sky to form a star called Aurvandils-tá ('Aurvandill's toe'). In wider medieval Germanic-speaking cultures, he was known as Ēarendel in Old English, Aurendil in Old High German, Auriwandalo in Lombardic, and possibly as auzandil (𐌰𐌿𐌶𐌰𐌽𐌳𐌹𐌻) in Gothic. An Old Danish latinized version, Horwendillus (Ørvendil), is also the name given to the father of Amlethus (Amleth) in Saxo Grammaticus' Gesta Danorum.

Comparative studies have led scholars to reconstruct a Common Germanic mythic figure, *Auza-wandilaz ('light-beam' or 'ray of light'), associated with brightness and dawn-light imagery. On the basis of the Old English and Gothic evidence, and to a lesser degree the Old Norse text (which mentions a star without additional details), this figure has been interpreted as relating to the rising light of the morning, sometimes identified with the Morning Star (Venus). The German and Old Danish material, however, is more difficult to integrate into this interpretative model.

== Name and origin ==
=== Etymology ===
The Old Norse name Aurvandill stems from a Proto-Germanic form reconstructed as *Auza-wandilaz, *Auzi-wandalaz, or *Auzo-wandiloz. It is cognate with Old English Ēarendel, Old High German Aurendil (≈ Orentil), and Lombardic Auriwandalo. The Gothic word auzandil, which can be read in the Gothica Bononiensia according to the interpretation of several experts, is probably another cognate.

==== Main interpretation ====
The exact meaning of the Proto-Germanic name has been the subject of sustained scholarly discussion. Most scholars favour a connection with dawn-light imagery, making Aurvandill a figure associated with brightness, the morning star, or a celestial phenomenon.

A commonly cited interpretation, first proposed by Rudolf Much in 1934, analyses *Auza-wandilaz as a compound meaning 'light-beam' or 'ray of light'. In this view, the prefix *auza- is derived from Proto-Germanic *auzom ('gloss, shiny liquid'), (Note: Compare with Old Norse aurr ('shine, gold'?) and OE ēar ('wave, sea'). From the PIE root *h₂ews- ('to shine, glow [red]'). Pro-Germanic *auzom is either cognate or borrowed from Latin aurum.) while the second element *-wandilaz is traced to *wanđuz ('rod, cane'). (Note: Compare with Gothic wandus ('rod') and Old Norse vǫndr ('wand, switch, twig'). Middle English wond (modern wand 'a stick or rod') was borrowed from Old Norse.) The latter likely originates from the verb *wenđanan ('to wind'), (Note: Compare with Gothic bi-windan ('to wind, wrap'), Old Norse vinda ('to wring, twist'), Old Saxon windan ('turn, move') and Old High German wintan ('turn, move').) carrying connotations of suppleness and flexibility, that is, something that bends or moves with ease.

On this basis, Proto-Germanic *Auza-wandilaz may be interpreted as denoting the 'Morning Star' (Venus) or, more broadly, the 'rising light of the morning' (sunrise), a meaning that would be semantically parallel to Latin lucifer ('light-bringer, morning star'). Support for this interpretation comes from its descendant cognates, particularly the Old English figure Ēarendel, whose name is associated with the idea of 'rising light'. Ēarendel has been variously translated as 'brilliance, ray of light', 'dawn, sunrise', and 'morning star', and is attested as a rendering of Latin lūcifer in the Blickling Homilies. Further evidence have been drawn from the Gothic word auzandil, which translates the Koine Greek word heōsphóros ('dawn-bringer') in the Septuagint, itself rendered in Latin as lūcifer. In Old Norse tradition, Aurvandill is likewise connected with a star, though its identity remains uncertain.

==== Alternative theories ====
Other etymologies have been suggested. A different line of interpretation takes the prefix aur- from Proto-Germanic *aura- ('mud, sand, sediment'), (Note: Compare with Old Norse aurr ('wet clay, mud, wet soil') and Old English ēar ('earth; sea').) rendering the name as 'gravel-beam' or 'swamp-wand'. Christopher R. Fee thinks that this may imply the idea a phallic figure related to fertility, and notes that the name of Aurvandill's spouse, Gróa, literally meaning 'Growth'. Rudolph Much initially suggested to derive the second element from *wanđilaz ('Vandal'), with *Auza-wandilaz interpreted as 'the shining Vandal', although this has been rejected by later scholarship.

More recently, Piotr Gąsiorowski (2012) has proposed deriving the name from a Pre-Proto-Germanic form *h₂au̯sro-u̯óndh-elo-s ('the one wandering in the early morning'), yielding interpretations such as 'shining wanderer' or 'wandering light'. However, this raises phonological difficulties, since regular Gothic sound laws would be expected to produce **aurawandils rather than auzandil(s). Alternatively, Stefan Schaffner (2021) has posited an original form *h₂au̯s-ont-eló-s ('the little one rising in the morning'), with a diminutive suffix -eló.

=== Origin ===
Commentators since at least the time of Jacob Grimm's Deutsche Mythologie, published in 1835, have emphasized the great age of the tradition reflected in the mythological material associated with this name, without being able to fully reconstruct the motifs of a Common Germanic myth. The difficulty is compounded by the fact that the narratives surrounding Orendel and Horwendillus appear to be unrelated to those of Ēarendel and Aurvandill. However, some scholars, including Georges Dumézil and Stefan Schaffner, have attempted to demonstrate that Saxo's Horwendillus and Snorri's Aurvandill may ultimately derive from a shared archetypal myth.

The apparent discrepancies may be partly explained by the occurrence of derivatives of *Auza-wandilaz as personal names in the Lombardic and German traditions. Such usage is attested by historical figures named Auriwandalo and Aurendil in the 8th century AD, suggesting that the name circulated beyond a strictly mythological context. From this perspective, the Orendel of the Middle High German epic could represent an independent figure who bore the same name and developed independently. Although some scholars have also conjectured that he may constitute a saga-figure derived from the myth, they acknowledge that no substantive correspondences with the Old Norse tradition can be established.

Nevertheless, Rudolf Simek and John Lindow argue that the linguistic relationship between the Old Norse and Old English names still points to a Common Germanic origin of the myth, despite the absence of Aurvandill from the Poetic Edda. They maintain that Aurvandill was probably already associated with a star in the original tradition, and that Snorri, in order to explain the name Aurvandils tá ('Aurvandill's Toe'), may have reshaped the narrative on the model of the tale in which Thor casts Þjazi's eyes into the sky to form stars.

== Attestations ==
=== Old Norse ===
The Old Norse figure Aurvandill is mentioned only once in Norse mythology, in Skáldskaparmál, a book of Snorri Sturluson's 13th-century Prose Edda. In the passage, Thor tells to Aurvandill's wife Gróa that he waded through the river Élivágar, coming from the north, while carrying Aurvandill in a basket on his back. During the crossing, one of Aurvandill's toes protruded from the basket, froze, and broke off. Thor then picked up the severed toe and threw it into the sky, where it became a star known as Aurvandils tá.

Thor went home to Thrúdvangar, and the hone remained sticking in his head. Then came the wise woman who was called Gróa, wife of Aurvandill the Valiant: she sang her spells over Thor until the hone was loosened. But when Thor knew that, and thought that there was hope that the hone might be removed, he desired to reward Gróa for her leech-craft and make her glad, and told her these things: that he had waded from the north over Icy Stream and had borne Aurvandill in a basket on his back from the north out of Jötunheim. And he added for a token, that one of Aurvandill's toes had stuck out of the basket, and became frozen; wherefore Thor broke it off and cast it up into the heavens, and made thereof the star called Aurvandill's Toe. Thor said that it would not be long ere Aurvandill came home: but Gróa was so rejoiced that she forgot her incantations, and the hone was not loosened, and stands yet in Thor's head. Therefore it is forbidden to cast a hone across the floor, for then the hone is stirred in Thor's head.

According to Georges Dumézil, this passage appears to be part of a broader story in which Aurvandill is abducted by the jǫtnar. The thunder-god Thor confronts one of them (Hrungnir in Snorri's version) and ultimately frees Aurvandill, but departs with the jǫtunn's weapon lodged in his head.

At the end of the story, Aurvandill's frost-bitten toe is made into a new star by Thor. However, it is not clear what celestial object is indicated in this passage. Guesses as to its identity have included Sirius or the planet Venus. Aurvandilstá ('Aurvandill's Toe') has also been identified with blue-white star Rigel, which could be viewed as forming the foot of the constellation Orion (the latter equated with Aurvandill itself).

Christopher R. Fee has proposed that the myth reflects an ancient Indo-European fertility tradition, in which the jötnar represent chaotic natural forces embodied as arctic cold that threaten agricultural fertility. Gróa's practice of seiðr (magic) associates her with the fertility gods of the Vanir, and the toe could be associated with the frozen phallus of the captive Aurvandill.

=== Gothica Bononiensia ===
The oldest attestation of this name may occur in the Gothica Bononiensia, a sermon from Ostrogothic Italy written in the Gothic language not later than the first half of the 6th century, and discovered in 2009.

On folio 2 recto, within a quotation of Isaiah 14:12, the linguist P. A. Kerkhof proposed reading the word 𐌰𐌿𐌶𐌰𐌽𐌳𐌹𐌻 (auzandil) in a difficult-to-decipher part of the palimpsest. This interpretation has been accepted by several experts, including Carla Falluomini, Stefan Schaffner, and Roland Schuhmann. Some scholar have suggested emending the form to *auzandils to better account for its etymological relationship with other Germanic names. The term translates the Koine Greek word ἑωσφόρος (heōsphóros, 'dawn-bringer') from the Septuagint, which is rendered in Latin as lūcifer ('light-bringer, morning star'). In this passage, auzandil corresponds precisely to Old English ēarendel ('morning star'), which likewise serves as a translation of Latin lucifer in the Blickling Homilies.

... ƕaiwa usdraus us himina auzandil sa in maurgin urrinnanda ...
... how Lucifer did fall from heaven, he who emerges in the morning ...

=== Old English ===
The term ēarendel (≈ eorendel, earendil) appears seven times in the Old English corpus, where it is used in certain contexts to interpret the Latin oriens ('rising sun'), lucifer ('light-bringer'), aurora ('dawn') or iubar ('radiance'). According to J. E. Cross, textual evidence indicate that it originally meant 'coming or rising light, beginning of light, bringer of light', and that later innovations led to an extended meaning of 'radiance, light'. Philologist Tiffany Beechy writes that "the evidence from the early glossary tradition shows earendel to be a rare alternative for common words for the dawn/rising sun." According to her, the "Anglo-Saxons appear to have known earendel as a quasi-mythological figure who personified a natural phenomenon (sunrise) and an astrological/astronomical object (the morning star)."

==== Crist I ====
The lines 104–108 of the Old English poem Crist I (Christ I) describe the coming of Ēarendel to the earth:

Crist I (104–108): Eala Earendel, engla beorhtast, ofer middangeard monnum sended, ond soðfæsta sunnan leoma, torht ofer tunglas, – þu tida gehwane of sylfum þe symle inlihtes.	B. C. Row translation (1997): Oh rising light, brightest of angels sent to men throughout the world, and true light of the sun, bright above the stars, you constantly enlighten all seasons by your presence.	T. Beechy translation (2010): Eala earendel, brightest of angels, sent over the earth to mankind, and truest light of the sun, bright above the stars, all spans of time you, of yourself, enlighten always.

The impetus of the poem comes from the Latin Advent Antiphon: "O Orient/Rising One (= Oriens), splendour of eternal light and sun of justice: come and illuminate one sitting in darkness and the shadow of death". (Note: Latin: O Oriens, splendor lucis aeternae et sol justitiae: veni et illumina sedentem in tenebris et umbra mortis.) Scholars agree that Ēarendel was chosen in Crist I as an equivalent of the Latin Oriens, understood in a religious-poetic context as the 'source of true light', 'the fount of light', and the 'light (which) rises from the Orient'.

Traditionally, Ēarendel in Crist I is taken to personify either John the Baptist or Christ himself (depicted as the rising sun), the morning star, or the dawn. In the poem, he is described as the "true(st) light of the sun" (soðfæsta sunnan leoma) and as the "brightest of angels [≈ messengers]" (engla beorhtast). This portrayal suggests the idea of a heavenly or divine radiance sent both physically and metaphorically over the earth for the benefit of mankind. The lines 107b–8 (þu tida gehwaneof sylfum þe symle inlihtes), translated as "all spans of time you, of yourself, enlighten always", or as "you constantly enlighten all seasons by your presence", may also imply that Ēarendel exists in the poem as an eternal figure existing outside of time, and as the very force that makes time and its perception possible.

Beechy argues that the expression Ēalā Ēarendel ('O Ēarendel') could be an Old English poetic stock formula, as it finds "phonetic-associative echoes" in the expressions eorendel eall and eorendel eallunga from the Durham Hymnal Gloss.

==== Blickling Homilies ====
Ēarendel also appears in the Blickling Homilies (10th century AD), where he is explicitly identified with John the Baptist:

Blickling Homilies XIV (30–35):... onđ nu seo Cristes gebyrd at his æriste, se niwa eorendel Sanctus Iohannes; and nu se leoma þære soþan sunnan God selfa cuman wille. Sylle se friccea his stefne; and forþon þe nu þæt is se dema Drihten Crist, seo beme Sanctus lohannes, and nu mid God selfa on þysne middangeard cuman wile, — gange se engel beforan him Sanctus Iohannis;	R. Morris translation (1880):... and now the birth of Christ [was] at his appearing, and the new Ēarendel was John the Baptist. And now the gleam of the true Sun, God himself, shall come; let the crier give out his voice. And because that the Lord Christ is now the Judge, Saint John will be the trumpet, and will therefore come with God himself upon this earth; — let the messenger Saint John go before him.

The passage is based on a Latin sermon by the 5th-century Archbishop of Ravenna Petrus Chrysologus: "But since he is about to appear, now let John spring forth, because the birth of Christ follows closely; let the new Lucifer arise, because now the light (= iubar) of the true Sun is breaking forth". (Note: Latin: Sed si processurus est, iam nascatur Ioannes, quia instat nativitas Christi; surgat novus Lucifer, quia iubar iam veri Solis erumpit.). Since the Old English version is close to the original Latin, ēarendel can be clearly identified in this passage with lucifer, meaning in liturgical language the 'light bearer, the planet Venus as morning star, the sign auguring the birth of Christ'. In this context, ēarendel is to be understood as the morning star, the light whose rising signifies Christ's birth, and whose appearance comes in the poem before the "gleam of the true Sun, God himself".

==== Durham Hymnal Gloss ====
In the Durham Hymnal Gloss (early 11th century AD), the name ēarendel is used in specific contexts to gloss the Latin aurora ('dawn; east, orient') instead of the more common equivalent dægrima ('dawn'), also mentioned in the same line. Hymns 15.8 and 30.1 imply that ēarendel appears with the dawn, as the light that "quite suffuses the sky", rather than being the dawn itself ("the dawn comes up in its course, eorendel steps fully forth").

Durham Hymnal Gloss: Hymn 15.8 aurora cursus provehit—aurora tota prodeat (the dawn in its course draws near—the dawn fully appears) Hymn 30.1 aurora iam spargit polum (the dawn quite suffuses the sky)	Old English version: Hymn 15.8 dægrima rynas upalymþ – eorendel eall forðstæppe (the dawn comes up in its course, eorendel steps fully forth) Hymn 30.1 eorendel eallunga geondstret heofon (eorendel quite suffuses the sky)

==== Épinal Glossary ====
The Épinal Glossary, written in England in the 8th century, associates ēarendel with the Latin iubar ('brightness, radiance' [especially of heavenly bodies]) as an alternative to the more frequent Old English equivalent leoma ('ray of light, gleam'). Two copies of the Épinal Glossary were produced in the late 8th or early 9th century: the Épinal-Erfurt Glossary, which gives the equation leoma vel earendiI (≈ leoma vel oerendil), and the Corpus Glossary, which was redacted from an archetype of the Épinal-Erfurt exemplar.

=== German ===
The forms Aurendil (≈ Horindil, Urendil), dating from the 8th century, and Ōrendil (≈ Orentil), dating from the 9th–10th century, are attested as personal names in Old High German.

The Middle High German epic poem Orendel, written in the late 12th century, presents a fictional story of how the Holy Mantle of Christ arrived in the city of Trier. This narrative was likely inspired by the actual transfer of the Mantle to the main altar of Trier Cathedral in 1196. The poem's style, characterized by its "paratactic organization of episodes and the repetition of poetic formulas", suggests it may be rooted in an older oral tradition.

The eponymous hero of the tale, Orendel, son of King Ougel, sets sail with a formidable fleet to reach the Holy Land and seek the hand of Bride, Queen of Jerusalem. After enduring a shipwreck, Orendel is rescued by a fisherman and eventually retrieves the lost Mantle from the belly of a whale. The coat grants him protection, enabling him to win Bride's hand in marriage. Together, they rule Jerusalem for a time and embark on numerous adventures. In the end, Orendel disposes of the Holy Coat after bringing it to Trier.

The appendix to the Strassburger Heldenbuch (15th c.) names King Orendel (≈ Erentel) of Trier as the first of the heroes that were ever born. The name also gave way to various toponyms found in modern Germany, including Orendileshûs (in Grabfeld), Orendelsall (now part of Zweiflingen), and Orendelstein (in Öhringen).

=== Lombardic ===
The Lombardic form Auriwandalo appears twice as a personal name in the 8th century. According to Jan de Vries, these occurrences indicate the wide diffusion of the figure across the Germanic-speaking area by the Early Middle Ages.

=== Danish ===
A Latinized version of the Old Danish name, Horwendillus (Ørvendil), appears in Saxo Grammaticus' Gesta Danorum (ca. 1200) as the father of Amlethus (Amlet):

Now Ørvendil, after controlling the [Jutland] province for three years, had devoted himself to piracy and reaped such superlative renown that Koller, the king of Norway, wishing to rival his eminent deeds and widespread reputation, judged it would suit him very well if he could transcend him in warfare and cast a shadow over the brilliance of this world-famed sea-rover. He cruised about, combing various parts of the seas, until he lit upon Ørvendil's fleet. Each of the pirates had gained an island in the midst of the ocean and they had moored their ships on different sides. (...)

Both gave and accepted their word of honour on this point and fell to battle. They were not deterred from assailing each other with their blades by the novelty of their meeting or the springtime charm of that spot, for they took no heed of these things. Ørvendil's emotional fervour made him more eager to set upon his foe than to defend himself; consequently he disregarded the protection of his shield and laid both hands to his sword. This daring had its results. His rain of blows deprived Koller of his shield by cutting it to pieces; finally he carved off the other's foot and made him fall lifeless. He honoured their agreement by giving him a majestic funeral, constructing an ornate tomb, and providing a ceremony of great magnificence. After this he hounded down and slew Koller's sister Sæla, a warring amazon and accomplished pirate herself and skilled in the trade of fighting.

Three years were passed in gallant military enterprises, in which he marked the richest and choicest of the plunder for Rørik, to bring himself into closer intimacy with the king. On the strength of their friendship Ørvendil wooed and obtained Rørik's daughter Gerutha for his bride, who bore him a son, Amleth.

In view of Saxo's tendency to euhemerise and reinterpret traditional Scandinavian myths, philologist Georges Dumézil has proposed that his story was based on the same archetype as Snorri's Aurvandill. In what could be a literary inversion of the original myth, Horwendillus is portrayed as a warrior who injures and vanquishes his adversary, whereas Aurvandill was taken as a hostage by the jǫtnar and wounded during his deliverance. Dumézil also notes that, although the event does not take a cosmological turn in Saxo's version, Aurvandill's toe was broken off by Thor, while Collerus' (Koller's) entire foot is slashed off by Horwendillus.

According to scholar Stefan Schaffner, Koller (Collerus) may have originally meant 'the cold one', and the story could be based on an ancient myth of the battle between the seasons, in which the cold winter (Collerus) is defeated by spring or summer (Horwendillus). In this view, "Horwendillus, as the representative of summer, would fit very well with the identification of Aurvandill as Orion, the constellation that rises early in midsummer at the time of the grain harvest."

The family tree of legendary Kings of the Danes, according to the Gesta Danorum (Books 1 to 9)

Kings of the Danes are marked with a crown (♕). Kings of the Swedes are marked with a dagger (†). Superscript numbers after a name indicate in which books of Gesta Danorum the individual is mentioned.

Humblus ♂ ^{(1)}
KEY
Angul ♂ ^{(1)}	♕ Dan I ♂ ^{(1)}	Grytha ♀ ^{(1)}	Marriage or coupling
Parent and child
The Angles	♕ Humblus ♂ ^{(1)}	♕ Lotherus ♂ ^{(1)}	King of the Saxons ♂ ^{(1)}	Succession by other or unclear means
Roarus ♂ ^{(1)}
Sigtrugus, King of the Swedes† ♂ ^{(1)}	♕ Skioldus ♂ ^{(1)}	Alvilda ♀ ^{(1)}
daughter of Roarus ♀ ^{(1)}	Bessus ♂ ^{(1)}
sister of Gram ♀ ^{(1)}	Gro ♀ ^{(1)}	♕ Gram† ♂ ^{(1)}	Sumblus, King of the Finns ♂ ^{(1)}
Wagnofthus ♂ ^{(1)}
Signe ♀ ^{(1)}	Henricus, King of the Saxons ♂ ^{(1)}	Haquinus, King of the Nitherians ♂ ^{(1)}
Harthgrepa ♀ ^{(1)}
♕Suibdagerus, King of Norway† ♂ ^{(1)}	sister of Guthormus ♀ ^{(1)}	♕Guthormus ♂ ^{(1)}	♕Hadingus ♂ ^{(1,2,4,5)}	Regnilda ♀ ^{(1)}
Asmundus† ♂ ^{(1)}	Gunnilda ♀ ^{(1)}	Guthormus ♂ ^{(1)}
Ulvilda ♀ ^{(1,2)}	♕ Ubbo ♂ ^{(2)}
Henricus ♂ ^{(1)}	Uffo† ♂ ^{(1)}	Hundingus† ♂ ^{(1,2)}	Thorilda ♀ ^{(2)}	Scottus ♂ ^{(2)}
daughter of Uffo ♀ ^{(1)}	Regnerus† ♂ ^{(2)}	Suanhuita ♀ ^{(2)}	sisters of Suanhuita ♀♀ ^{(2)}	Andwan, King of the Hellespont ♂ ^{(2)}
Thoraldus ♂ ^{(2)}
♕ Frotho I ♂ ^{(2,5)}	daughter of Andwan ♀ ^{(2)}
Hothbrodus† ♂ ^{(2,3)}	♕ Haldanus I ♂ ^{(2)}	Roe ♂ ^{(2)}	Skato ♂ ^{(2)}
Thora ♀ ^{(2)}
♕ Helgo ♂ ^{(2,3)}	♕ Roe ♂ ^{(2)}
Athislus† ♂ ^{(2,3)}	Ursa ♀ ^{(2)}
King Gevarus ♂ ^{(2,3)}	♕ Rolvo Krake† ♂ ^{(2,3)}	Ruta ♀ ^{(2)}	Biarco ♂ ^{(2)}	Sculda ♀ ^{(2)}	♕Hiarwarthus † ♂ ^{(2,3)}
♕ Hotherus† ♂ ^{(2,3)}	Nanna ♀ ^{(3)}	Herlecus ♂ ^{(3)}	Gericus ♂ ^{(3)}
former King of Britain ♂ ^{(3)}	mother of the King of Britain ♀ ^{(3)}	a slave ♂ ^{(3)}	a bondmaid ♀ ^{(3)}	♕ Roricus Slyngebond ♂ ^{(3)}	Gerwendillus ♂ ^{(3)}
King of Britain ♂ ^{(3,4)}	Queen of Britain ♀ ^{(3,4)}	Gerutha ♀ ^{(3,4)}	Horwendillus ♂ ^{(3,4)}	Fengo ♂ ^{(3,4)}
foster sister of Amlethus ♀ ^{(3,4)}	daughter of the King of Britain ♀ ^{(3,4)}	Amlethus ♂ ^{(3,4)}	Herminthruda, Queen of Scotland ♀ ^{(4)}	♕ Wiglecus ♂ ^{(4)}
son of Amlethus ♂ ^{(4)}	♕Wermundus ♂ ^{(4)}	Frowinus, governor of Sleswik ♂ ^{(4)}
♕ Uffo, or Olavus the Gentle ♂ ^{(4)}	daughter of Frowin ♀ ^{(4)}	Keto ♂ ^{(4)}	Wigo ♂ ^{(4)}
♕ Dan II ♂ ^{(4)}
♕ Huglecus ♂ ^{(4)}
♕ Frotho II, the Vigorous ♂ ^{(4)}
♕ Dan III ♂ ^{(4)}
Craca ♀ ^{(5)}	Regnerus ♂ ^{(5)}	Bracus ♂ ^{(5)}	♕ Fridlevus I, the Swift ♂ ^{(4,5)}	Hun, King of the Huns ♂ ^{(5)}	Hun ♂ ^{(5)}
Gøtarus, King of Norway ♂ ^{(5)}	Westmarus ♂ ^{(5)}	Colo ♂ ^{(5)}	Gøtwara ♀ ^{(5)}
Rollerus ♂ ^{(5)}	Ericus the Shrewd-spoken† ♂ ^{(5,6)}	Gunwara the Fair ♀ ^{(5)}	Alvilda ♀ ^{(5)}	♕ Frotho III ♂ ^{(5,6)}	Hanunda ♀ ^{(5)}	Grep (eldest of three) ♂ ^{(5)}	11 other sons (two named Grep) ♂♂ ^{(5)}
Hythin, King of Tellemark ♂ ^{(6)}	Alvo ♂ ^{(5)}	Ofura ♀ ^{(5)}	Arngrimus ♂ ^{(5)}	Grubbus ♂ ^{(6)}	♕ Hiarnus ♂ ^{(6)}	Amundus, King of Norway ♂ ^{(6)}
child of Hythin ^{(6)}	Haldanus† ♂ ^{(6)}	12 sons, including Angantir ♂♂ ^{(5)}	Ano ♂ ^{(6)}	Iuritha ♀ ^{(6)}	♕ Fridlevus II ♂ ^{(6)}	Frogertha ♀ ^{(6)}
Hanevus, King of Saxony ♂ ^{(6)}	Suertingus, King of Saxony ♂ ^{(6)}	Olavus ♂ ^{(6)}	♕ Frotho IV ♂ ^{(6)}
Sywardus† ♂ ^{(6,7)}	sons of Suertingus ♂♂ ^{(6)}	sister of the sons of Suertingus ♀ ^{(6)}	♕ Ingellus ♂ ^{(6,7)}	Helga ♀ ^{(6)}	Helgo ♂ ^{(6)}	Asa ♀ ^{(6)}
three sons that died in war ♂♂ ^{(7)}	♕ Olavus I ♂ ^{(7)}	Karolus, governor of Gothland ♂ ^{(7)}
Ulvilda ♀ ^{(7)}	♕ Frotho V ♂ ^{(7)}	Hatherus ♂ ^{(7)}	♕ Haraldus I ♂ ^{(7)}	Sygne ♀ ^{(7)}
Ericus† ♂ ^{(7)}	Thorhilda ♀ ^{(7)}	♕ Haldanus II Biargrammus† ♂ ^{(7)}	♕Haraldus II ♂ ^{(7)}
Ebbo ♂ ^{(7)}	mother of Otharus ♀ ^{(7)}	♕ Unguinus, King of the Goths ♂ ^{(7)}	Asmundus ♂ ^{(7)}
sister of Otharus ♀ ^{(7)}	♕ Sywaldus I ♂ ^{(7)}	Sygrutha ♀ ^{(7)}	Kings of Norway
Sywardus, King of the Goths ♂ ^{(7)}	mother of Alvilda ♀ ^{(7)}	Otharus ♂ ^{(7)}	Syritha ♀ ^{(7)}	♕ Sygarus ♂ ^{(7)}	queen of Sygarus ♀ ^{(7)}	Hamundus, a petty king ♂ ^{(7)}
Wemundus ♂ ^{(7)}	Ostenus ♂ ^{(7)}	♕Sywaldus II ♂ ^{(7)}	Algerus ♂ ^{(7)}	Helwin ♂ ^{(7)}	Hamundus ♂ ^{(7)}
Regnaldus, King of the Northmen ♂ ^{(7)}	Alvilda ♀ ^{(7)}	Alf ♂ ^{(7)}	Sygne ♂ ^{(7)}	Hagbarthus ♂ ^{(7)}	Hako ♂ ^{(7)}
Gro ♀ ^{(7)}	Borcarus ♂ ^{(7)}	Drota ♀ ^{(7)}	Gunnarus ♂ ^{(7)}	Hano, ruler of Funen ♂ ^{(7)}	Ostmarus, ruler of Scania ♂ ^{(7)}	Hundingus, ruler of Zealand ♂ ^{(7)}	Roricus, co-ruler of Jutland ♂ ^{(7)}	Hatherus, co-ruler of Jutland ♂ ^{(7)}
Haraldus ♂ ^{(7)}	Hildigerus ♂ ^{(7)}	Røtho, a Ruthenian pirate ♂ ^{(7)}	Wesetus ♂
♕Haldanus III ♂ ^{(7)}	Guritha ♀ ^{(7)}
Alverus† ♂ ^{(7,8)}	♕ Haraldus III Hyldetan ♂ ^{(7)}
Olavus ♂ ^{(7)}	Ingo ♂ ^{(7)}	Ingeldus† ♂ ^{(7)}	sister of Haraldus ♀ ^{(7)}	Ubbo ♂ ^{(7)}	sister of Haraldus ♀ ^{(7)}	Sywardus ♂ ^{(7)}	sister of Haraldus ♀ ^{(7)}	Olavus, king of the Werms ♂ ^{(7)}
♕ Ringo I† ♂ ^{(7,8)}	♕ Hetha ♀ ^{(8)}	♕ Olo the Vigorous ♂ ^{(7,8)}	Esa ♀ ^{(7)}	son of the king ♂ ^{(7,8)}
Atylo the Scanian ♂ ^{(8)}	Ringo, ruler of Norway ♂ ^{(8)}
Tola ♂ ^{(8)}	Omothus, or Homothus ♂ ^{(8)}	daughter of Ringo ♀ ^{(8)}	Esa ♀ ^{(8)}	♕ Omundus ♂ ^{(7,8)}
Sibbo ♂ ^{(8)}	sister of Gøtarus ♀ ^{(8)}	Gøtarus† ♂ ^{(8)}	daughter of Omundus ♀ ^{(8)}	♕ Sywardus I ♂ ^{(8)}	♕ Buthlus ♂ ^{(8)}	daughter of Omundus ♀ ^{(8)}
Ebbo ♂ ^{(8)}
early wife of Iarmericus ♀ ^{(8)}	♕Iarmericus † ♂ ^{(8)}	Suanilda ♀ ^{(8)}	the Hellepontines, 4 brothers ♂♂ ^{(8)}	Iarmericus' sister, sold to Norwegians ♀ ^{(8)}	Iarmericus' sister, sold to Germans ♀ ^{(8)}
♕ Broderus ♂ ^{(8)}	nephews of Iarmericus ♂♂ ^{(8)}
King of the Goths ♂ ^{(8)}	♕ Sywaldus III ♂ ^{(8)}
King of Sweden† ♂ ^{(8)}	daughter of the King of the Goths ♀ ^{(8)}	♕ Snio ♂ ^{(8)}
♕ Biorn ♂ ^{(8)}
♕ Haraldus III ♂ ^{(8)}
a queen from Sweden ♀ ^{(8)}	♕ Gormo I ♂ ^{(8)}
♕ Gotricus, or Godefridus ♂ ^{(8,9)}
♕ Olavus III ♂ ^{(9)}	daughter of Gotricus ♀ ^{(9)}	Sywardus, King of Norway ♂ ^{(9)}	unknown
♕Hemmingus ♂ ^{(9)}	♕Siwardus II Ring ♂ ^{(9)}	♕ Ringo II ♂ ^{(9)}	Herothus† ♂ ^{(9)}	Hesbernus ♂ ^{(9)}
ruler in Norway ♂ ^{(9)}	Lathgertha ♀ ^{(9)}	♕Regnerus Lothbrog ♂ ^{(9)}	Thora ♀ ^{(9)}
Suanlogha ♀ ^{(9)}	a woman ♀ ^{(9)}
2 daughters ♀♀ ^{(9)}	Fridlevus ♂ ^{(9)}	♕ Haraldus ♂ ^{(9)}	♕ Siwardus & Ericus ♂♂ ^{(9)}	Rathbarthus ♂ ^{(9)}	Dunwatus ♂ ^{(9)}	Ubbo ♂ ^{(9)}
Regnaldus ♂ ^{(9)}	Withsercus ♂ ^{(9)}	Ericus Wind-hat ♂ ^{(9)}	Guthormus ♂ ^{(9)}	♕ Ericus I ♂ ^{(9)}	♕ Sywardus Snake-Eye ♂ ^{(9)}	Biornus ♂ ^{(9)}	Agnerus ♂ ^{(9)}	Ivarus ♂ ^{(9)}
daughter of Guthormus ♀ ^{(9)}	♕ Ericus II ♂ ^{(9)}
♕ Kanutus I ♂ ^{(9)}
♕ Frotho VI ♂ ^{(9)}
♕ Gormo II the English ♂ ^{(9)}
♕ Haraldus V ♂ ^{(9)}	Hedelradus, King of England ♂ ^{(9)}
♕ Gormo III ♂ ^{(9)}	Thira ♀ ^{(9)}
Kanutus ♂ ^{(9)}	Haraldus VI ♂ ^{(9)}

Genealogical information is derived from Oliver Elton's 1905 translation, The First Nine Books of the Danish History of Saxo Grammaticus (via Wikisource). Name spellings are from the 1931 Latin critical edition by Olrik and Ræder (via Wikisource). Regnal numbers, which do not appear in the original text, are included for clarity and taken from the engraving Veræ effigies regum omnium by Erico Olai Tormio.

== In popular culture ==
=== Tolkien's The Silmarillion ===
The English writer J. R. R. Tolkien discovered the lines 104–105 of Cynewulf's Crist in 1913. According to him, the "great beauty" of the name Ēarendel, and the myth he seems to be associated with, inspired the character of Eärendil depicted in The Silmarillion. In 1914, Tolkien published a poem originally entitled "The Voyage of Earendel the Evening Star" as an account of Ēarendel's celestial course as the bright Morning-star. In a personal letter from 1967, Tolkien wrote:

When first studying A[nglo]-S[axon] professionally (1913) ... I was struck by the great beauty of this word (or name), entirely coherent with the normal style of A-S, but euphonic to a peculiar degree in that pleasing but not 'delectable' language ... it at least seems certain that it belonged to astronomical-myth, and was the name of a star or star-group. Before 1914, I wrote a 'poem' upon Earendel who launched his ship like a bright spark from the havens of the Sun. I adopted him into my mythology in which he became a prime figure as a mariner, and eventually as a herald star, and a sign of hope to men. Aiya Earendil Elenion Ancalima (II 329) 'hail Earendil brightest of Stars' is derived at long remove from Éala Éarendel engla beorhtast.

Tolkien interpreted Ēarendel as a messenger, probably inspired by his association with the word engel ('angel, messenger') in both Crist I (104) and the Blickling Homilies (21 & 35), and his identification with John the Baptist in the latter text. Tolkien's depiction of Eärendil as a herald also has echoes in the interpretation of the Old English Ēarendel as the Morning-star physically heralding the rising of the sun, which finds a figurative parallel in the Blickling Homilies, where Ēarendel heralds the coming of the "true Sun", Christ. Another pervasive aspect of Tolkien's Eärendil is his depiction as a mariner. Carl F. Hostetter notes that, although "the association of Eärendil with the sea was for Tolkien a deeply personal one", the Danish Horvandillus and the German Orendel are both portrayed as mariners themselves.

=== Others ===
In 2022, a group of scientists led by astronomer Brian Welch named star WHL0137-LS "Earendel" from the Old English meaning.

In the 2022 revenge thriller The Northman, written and directed by Robert Eggers, Aurvandill is portrayed by Ethan Hawke as the Raven King, father of Amleth, played by Alexander Skarsgård. The film draws on the medieval Scandinavian legend of Amleth, which also inspired Hamlet by William Shakespeare.

== See also ==
- Iubar
- Proto-Germanic folklore
- Lucifer
