= Christa =

Christa may refer to:

- Christa (given name), a female given name
- Janusz Christa (1934–2008), Polish comics author
- Swedish Fly Girls, a 1971 film also known as Christa
- 1015 Christa, an asteroid

== See also ==
- Christ (disambiguation)
- Christa-Elizabeth
- Christe
- Christi
- Christo (disambiguation)
- Christy (disambiguation)
- Crista
- Christia
- Krista
