= Christo (name) =

Christo is both a given name and surname. Notable people with the name include:

== Given name ==
- Christo (1935–2020), Bulgarian environmental artist
- Christo Albertyn Smith (1898–1956), South African botanist
- Christo Bilukidi (born 1989), Angolan-Canadian NFL defensive end
- Christo Botma (born 1991), South African-born Danish cricketer
- Christo Cave (born 1961), Trinidad and Tobago chess player
- Christo Christov (1926–2007), Bulgarian film director and screenwriter
- Christo Coetzee (1929–2000), South African assemblage and Neo-Baroque artist
- Christo du Plessis (born 1989), South African rugby union player
- Christo Hall (born 1978) Australian entrepreneur, surfer and author
- Christo Hand (1924–2006), Irish Gaelic footballer
- Christo Louw, South African rugby league player
- Christo Niewoudt, South African cricketer
- Christo Pimpirev, Bulgarian scientist and explorer
- Christo Proykov (born 1946), Bulgarian Bishop of Sofia
- Christo Steyn (born 1961), South African tennis player
- Christo van Rensburg (born 1962), South African tennis player
- Christo, a fictional character in Disgaea 5

== Surname ==
- Bob Christo (c. 1938 – 2011), Australian-Indian civil engineer and actor
- Cyril Christo (born 1960), American writer
- Petros Christo (born 1975), heavy metal bass guitarist

== See also ==
- Christ (disambiguation)
- Christa (disambiguation)
- Cristo (disambiguation)
- Christos (disambiguation)
- de Homem-Christo
- Kristo (disambiguation)
- Monte Cristo (disambiguation)
