= Xus =

Xus may refer to:

- The plural of Xu, see Xu (disambiguation)
- An autonym for the Tolowa people
- A contraction of Christus
