= Christus =

Christus may refer to:

- Christ (title)

== People ==
- Petrus Christus (c. 1410s – c. 1475), Dutch painter
- Sir Christus (1978–2017), Finnish musician

== Music ==
- Christus (Liszt), an oratorio
- Christus (Mendelssohn), an unfinished oratorio Op.97
- Christus (opera), by Anton Rubinstein
- Christus. Mysterium in a Prelude and Three Oratorios, by Felix Draeseke

== Art ==
- Christus (statue), by Bertel Thorvaldsen
- Christus (Indianapolis), statue by unknown located in Indianapolis, Indiana

== Other ==
- Christus Health, a nonprofit company

== See also ==
- Christos (disambiguation)
- Christo (name)
- Christa (disambiguation)
- Christ (disambiguation)
