= Max Koch (disambiguation) =

Max Koch (1854–1925) was a German-born Australian botanical collector.

Max Koch may also refer to:

- Max Koch (academic) (1855–1931), German historian and literary critic
- Max Friedrich Koch (1859–1930), German history painter and photographer
- Max Koch (Fritz Muliar), Inspector Rex television character
