= Christos =

Christos may refer to:

- Jesus of Nazareth
- Christ (title), a title for the Jewish Messiah in Christianity
- Christos (surname)
- Christos (given name)
- SS Christos, a Greek owned, Liberian flagged cargo ship in service 1962-71

== See also ==
- Christ (disambiguation)
- Christo (disambiguation)
- Christa (disambiguation)
- Christus (disambiguation)
