= Crist =

Crist or CRIST may refer to:

- the word for the title Christ in various languages
- Crist (surname), including a list of people with the name
- Crist (poems), a group of three poems in Old English
- CRIST, a shipyard in Gdynia, Poland
