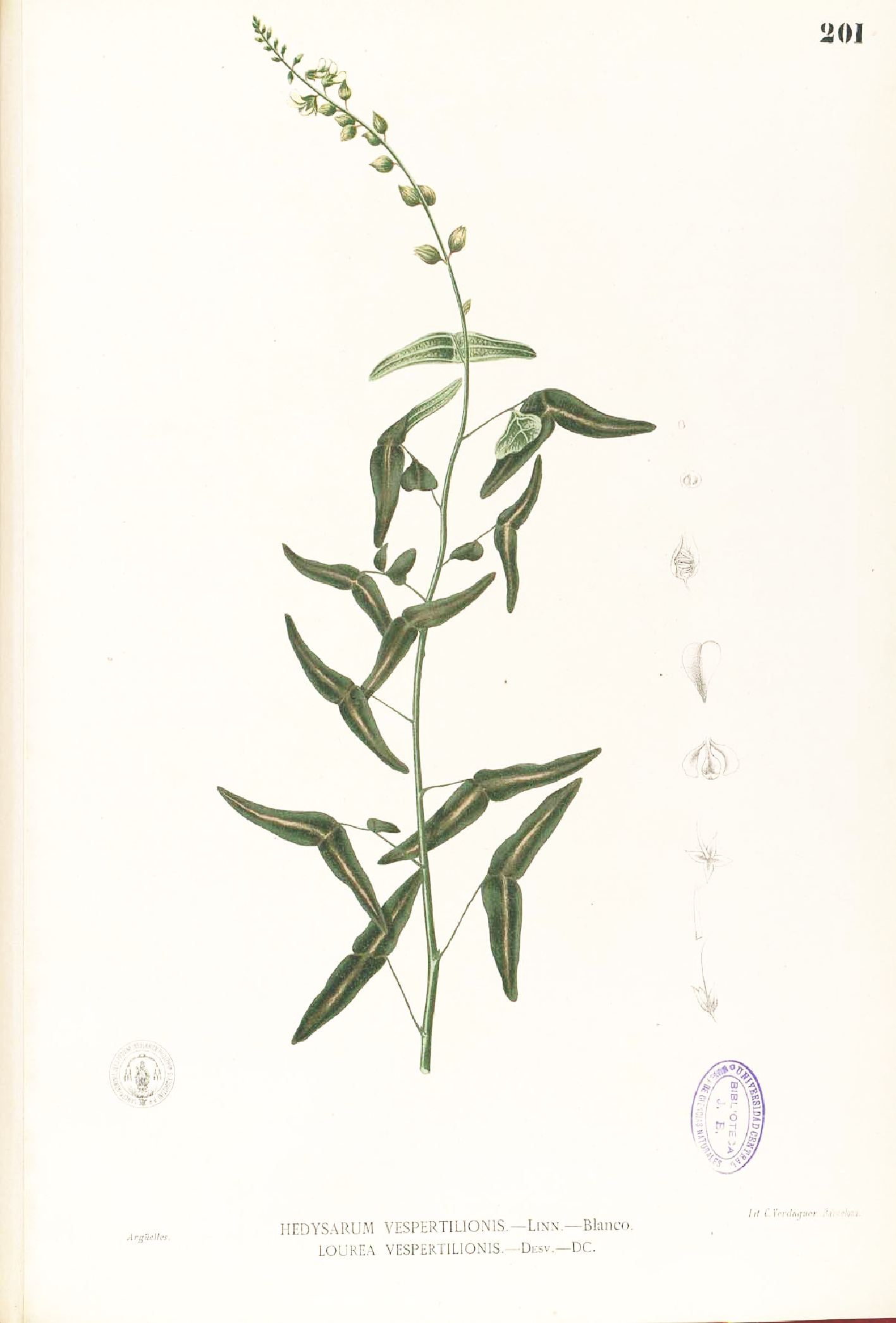

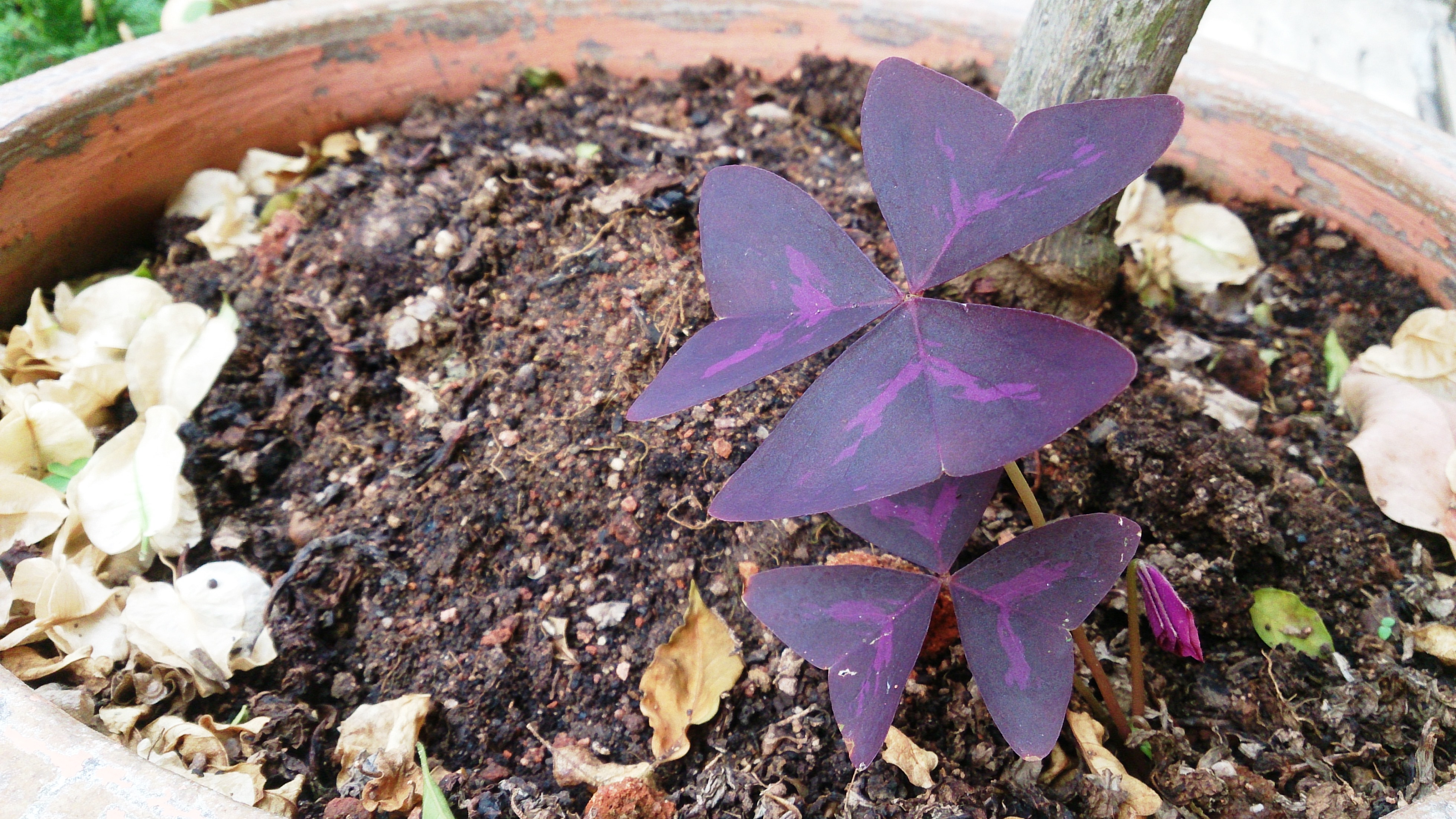

Conservation status
- Least Concern (IUCN 3.1)

Scientific classification
- Kingdom: Plantae
- Clade: Embryophytes
- Clade: Tracheophytes
- Clade: Spermatophytes
- Clade: Angiosperms
- Clade: Eudicots
- Clade: Rosids
- Order: Fabales
- Family: Fabaceae
- Subfamily: Faboideae
- Genus: Christia
- Species: C. vespertilionis

Binomial name
- Christia vespertilionis (L.f.) Bakh.f.

Synonyms
- Hedysarum vespertilionis L.f.; Lourea vespertilionis (L.f.) Desv.

= Christia vespertilionis =

Species of flowering plant

Christia vespertilionis, the red butterfly wing, is a species of perennial flowering plant in the family Fabaceae. Its native range extends from Southeast China to Tropical Asia. Additionally, it has been introduced into multiple territories, ranging from the Philippines to Myanmar to Pakistan, also reaching countries such as Jamaica and the Dominican Republic.

== Description ==
A tropical subshrub or perennial that can grow up to 60–120 cm tall.

The most characteristic organ of the species, the leaves, are compound, trifoliate. The terminal leaflet is larger than the two lateral leaflets. When provided adequate access to light, they have a burgundy color. Otherwise, they lose the color and revert to green.

== Taxonomy ==
The species was first described by Carl Linnaeus the Younger in 1782 as Hedysarum vespertilionis, but has since been reclassified by Nicaise Auguste Desvaux in 1813 under the Lourea genus as Lourea vespertilionis until it was transferred to the genus Christia in 1961 under its current binomial name.

== Subtaxa ==
The following subspecies are accepted:

- Christia vespertilionis var. vespertilionis
- Christia vespertilionis var. grandifolia Phon
