= Christo Hall =

Australian businessman (born 1978)

Christo Hall (born in 1978, in Sydney, Australia) is an entrepreneur, ex-professional surfer, author keynote speaker and owner of a marketing agency.

== Early years ==
Christo Hall was born in 1978 on the Northern Beaches of Sydney. He spent his childhood surfing and followed his childhood dream to become a professional surfer and featured in Surfing World Magazine Best Surfers of all Time Edition 2009. At age 14 he got his first surfboard sponsor Simon Anderson.

== Career ==
In 1991 Christo got sponsored by Billabong and was one of their team riders for 15 years. Christo is a surfer for North Narrabeen Board Riders club and has surf for the team to win 4 Australian titles Global Surf Tag News 05.02.2011 North Narrabeen National Surfing Reserve Book page 29 and featured in The Surfing Year Book.

In 2005 Christo retired from full-time international competition. Still had a 49th place on the surfing World Qualifying Series in 2008 and went into business producing beginner surfboards - Softboards Australia. He bought and sold a few other businesses in the surfing industry and in 2009 started Basic Bananas.

In 2025 and 2022 Christo Hall won the Masters Australian Surfing Championships in the over 40 years division.

Christo has been featured across the Australian media landscape including being a regular on 2UE Talking Lifestyle Show, Host of The BankWest Business Insights Podcast, Virgin Inflight Entertainment, The Sydney Morning Herald, The Age, SmartCompany, BRW, The Today Show Channel 9, Inside Small Business in relation to surfing, business and marketing.

Christo has published 3 books Beyond The Break published by Wiley in 2024, Perception published July 2016 and in 2012 Hall published his first book Bananas About Marketing.

Besides running different businesses, Christo is also a keynote speaker on the topics of professional surfing, personal development, marketing and entrepreneurship. Regularly delivering keynote presentations for businesses and councils.

== Personal life ==
Hall lives in Narrabeen on Sydney's Northern Beaches with his family
