= Anton F. L. Pelt =

German Protestant theologian

Anton Friedrich Ludwig Pelt (28 June 1799, in Regensburg – 22 January 1861, in Kemnitz) was a German Protestant theologian.

He studied philosophy and theology at the universities of Jena and Kiel, obtaining his habilitation at the University of Berlin in 1826. While serving as a lecturer of theology at Berlin, he was influenced by the teachings of Friedrich Schleiermacher, August Neander and Georg Wilhelm Friedrich Hegel. In 1828 he became an associate professor at the University of Greifswald, and in 1835 succeeded August Detlev Christian Twesten as a full professor at the University of Kiel. In 1852, he was relieved of his duties at the university following the takeover of Schleswig-Holstein by the Danish government. Subsequently, he relocated to a parish in Kemnitz, where in 1857 he was appointed ecclesiastical superintendent.

With Georg Friedrich Heinrich Rheinwald and Karl August Traugott Vogt, he edited the Homiliarum Patristicum, and in 1838 was co-founder of the publication Theologische Mitarbeiten.

== Selected works ==
- Epistolas Pauli apostoli ad Thessalonicenses, 1830 – Epistles of Paul the Apostle; Thessalonians.
- Der Kampf aus dem Glauben und die religiösen Parteien unsrer Zeit, 1837 – The struggle with faith and the religious parties of our time (an observation brought on by the second edition of David Strauss's Das Leben Jesu and Christoph Friedrich von Ammon's Fortbildung des Christenthums zur Weltreligion).
- Protestantismus, Supranaturalismus, Rationalismus und speculative Theologie, 1839 – Protestantism, supranaturalism, rationalism and speculative theology.
- Theologische Encyklopädie als System im Zusammenhange mit der Geschichte der theologischen Wissenshcaft und ihrer einzelnen Zweige, 1843 – Theological encyclopedia as a system in connection with the history of theological knowledge and its individual branches.
- Die Schleswigschen Prediger im Verhältniß zu der im Herzogthum Schleswig eingesetzten Verwaltungscommission, 1850 – The Schleswig preachers in proportion to the administrative commission established by the Duchy of Schleswig.
