= Christ III =

Anonymous Old English religious poem

- Also known as: Christ C
- Author(s): Anonymous
- Language: Old English
- Series: Old English Christ triad, along with Christ I and Christ II, constituting lines 867–1664
- Manuscript(s): Exeter Book, fos. 20b–32a
- Genre: Religious poem
- Subject: Last Judgment

Christ III is an anonymous Old English religious poem which forms the last part of Christ, a poetic triad found at the beginning of the Exeter Book. Christ III is found on fols. 20b–32a and constitutes lines 867–1664 of Christ in Krapp and Dobbie's Anglo-Saxon Poetic Records edition. The poem is concerned with the Second Coming of Christ (parousia) and the Last Judgment.

== Sample ==
This passage, about fire engulfing the world at Judgement Day, gives a modern English translation of Christ III, lines 993–1013 (in the line-numbering of the Anglo-Saxon Poetic Records):

Seoþeð swearta leg synne on fordonum,
ond goldfrætwe gleda forswelgað,
eall ærgestreon eþelcyninga.
Ðær bið cirm ond cearu, ond cwicra gewin,
gehreow ond hlud wop bi heofonwoman,
earmlic ælda gedreag. Þonan ænig ne mæg,
firendædum fah, frið gewinnan,
legbryne losian londes ower,
ac þæt fyr nimeð þurh foldan gehwæt,
græfeð grimlice, georne aseceð
innan ond utan eorðan sceatas,
oþþæt eall hafað ældes leoma
woruldwidles wom wælme forbærned.
Ðonne mihtig god on þone mæran beorg
mid þy mæstan mægenþrymme cymeð,
heofonengla cyning, halig scineð,
wuldorlic ofer weredum, waldende god,
ond hine ymbutan æþelduguð betast,
halge herefeðan, hlutre blicað,
eadig engla gedryht. Ingeþoncum
forhte beofiað fore fæder egsan.

Translation:

The black flame will seethe sins among the corrupted,
And hot coals will devour gold ornaments,
All ancient wealth of worldly kings.
There will be uproar and grief, strife of the living,
Lamenting and wailing at the sound of heav’n:
Men’s wretched din. Thenceforth anyone
Stained by their sins cannot win peace,
Nor escape the firestorm across the land,
And that fire takes all throughout earth’s folds,
Cruelly carves out, eagerly seeks out,
Inside and outside earth’s projections,
Until the tongue of flame has swallowed all
Sounds of world-blight in its torrent.
Then mighty God upon that famed mountain
By means of that most great power will come,
Heav’n-angels’ king will shine holy,
Glorious beyond men, powerful God,
And about Him the noblest host,
A holy troop, will shine brightly,
A true angel-host. In their inner thoughts
They quake fearfully before the dread Father.

== Other Old English eschatological poems ==
- Blickling Homily nos. 7 and 10
- Judgement Day I
- Judgement Day II

== Editions and translations ==
- Foys, Martin et al. (ed.).Old English Poetry in Facsimile Project. Center for the History of Print and Digital Culture, University of Wisconsin–Madison, 2019-); poem edited in transcription and digital facsimile editions, with Modern English translation
- Krapp, George Philip, and Dobbie, Elliott Van Kirk (eds.) (1936) The Exeter Book. (The Anglo-Saxon Poetic Records; 3.) New York: Columbia University Press
- Bradley, S. A. J. (tr.) (1982) Anglo-Saxon Poetry: an anthology of Old English poems in prose translation. London: Dent
