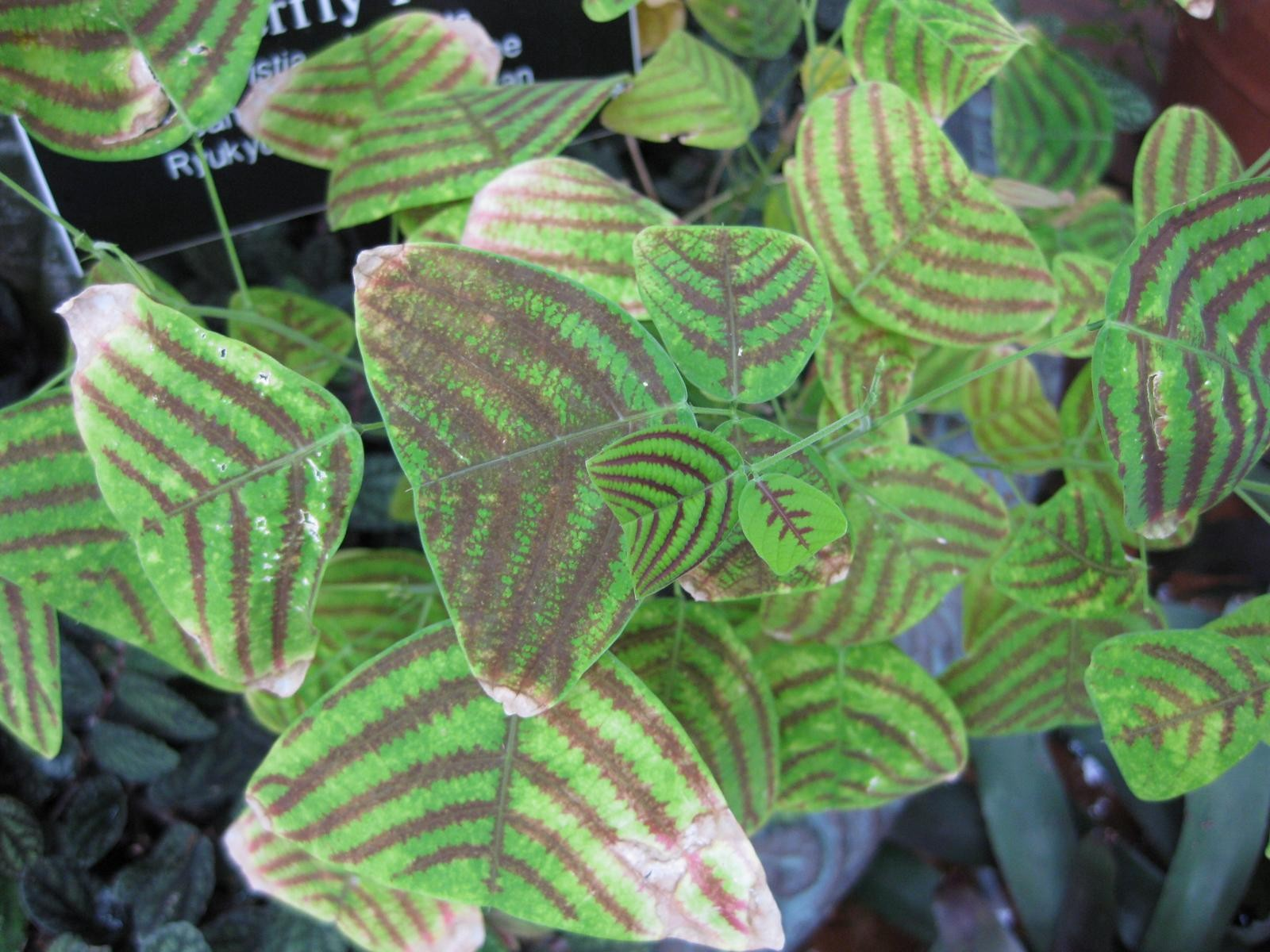

Scientific classification
- Kingdom: Plantae
- Clade: Tracheophytes
- Clade: Angiosperms
- Clade: Eudicots
- Clade: Rosids
- Order: Fabales
- Family: Fabaceae
- Subfamily: Faboideae
- Genus: Christia
- Species: C. obcordata

Binomial name
- Christia obcordata (Poir.) Bakh.f.

= Christia obcordata =

Species of flowering plant

Christia obcordata is a flowering plant in the family Fabaceae. The plant is notable for its butterfly-shaped leaves. C. obcordata is used medicinally in Japan and Indonesia to treat urinary blockages. It was also evaluated as a means to treat malaria in 2007, but was found to be ineffective.

== Alternative names ==
- Butterfly plant
- Butterfly leaf
- Iron butterfly
- Butterfly stripe
- Swallowtail
