= Karl August Traugott Vogt =

German Protestant theologian

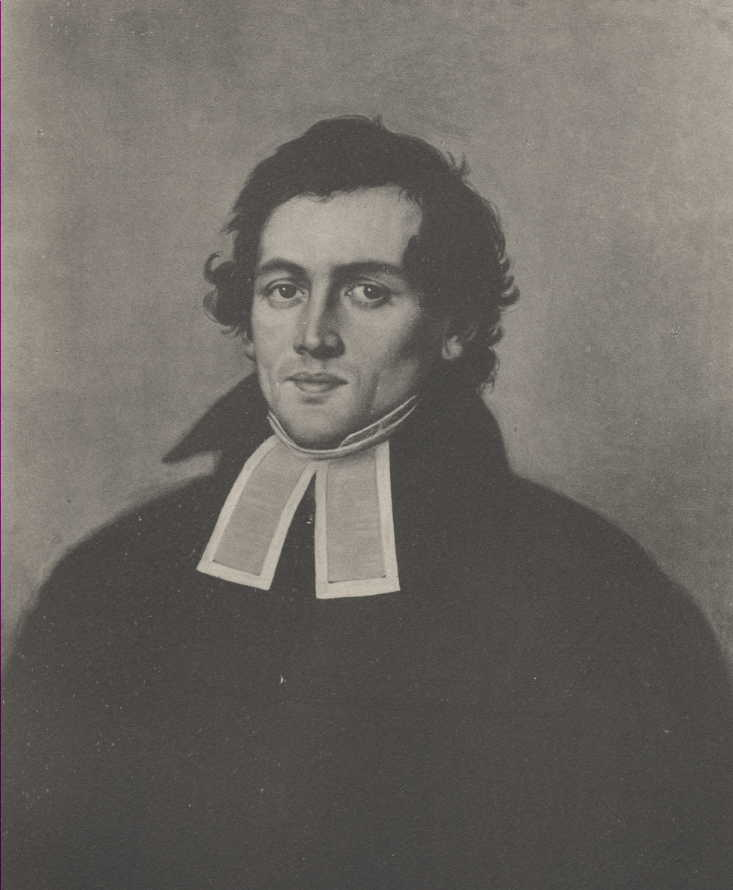
- Born: March 15, 1808; Wittenberg, Germany
- Died: January 22, 1869 (aged 60); Greifswald, Germany
- Education: Humboldt University of Berlin
- Children: Friedrich Vogt
- Theological work
- Language: German

Karl August Traugott Vogt, name sometimes given as Carl Vogt (15 March 1808 – 22 January 1869) was a German Protestant theologian. He was the father of philologist Friedrich Vogt (1851–1923).

Vogt was born in Wittenberg. In 1830 he obtained his habilitation at the University of Berlin, where he later became an associate professor of church history and practical theology. During his time spent in Berlin, he gave sermons at the Trinity Church. In 1837 he relocated as a full professor to the University of Greifswald, where on three occasions he served as university rector (1846/47, 1855/56 and 1862/63). In Greifswald, he also served as an ecclesiastical superintendent and as a member of the Consistory. He died in Greifswald, aged 60.

== Selected works ==
- Neoplatonismus und Christenthum; Untersuchungen über die angeblichen Schriften Dionysius des Areopagiten, 1836 – Neoplatonism and Christianity; Studies on the alleged writings of Dionysius the Areopagite.
- Johannes Bugenhagen, Pomeranus : Leben und ausgewählte Schriften, 1867 – Johannes Bugenhagen, Pomeranus; life and selected writings.

With Anton Friedrich Ludwig Pelt and Georg Friedrich Heinrich Rheinwald, he edited the Homiliarum Patristicum.
