= Orendel =

Middle High German poem

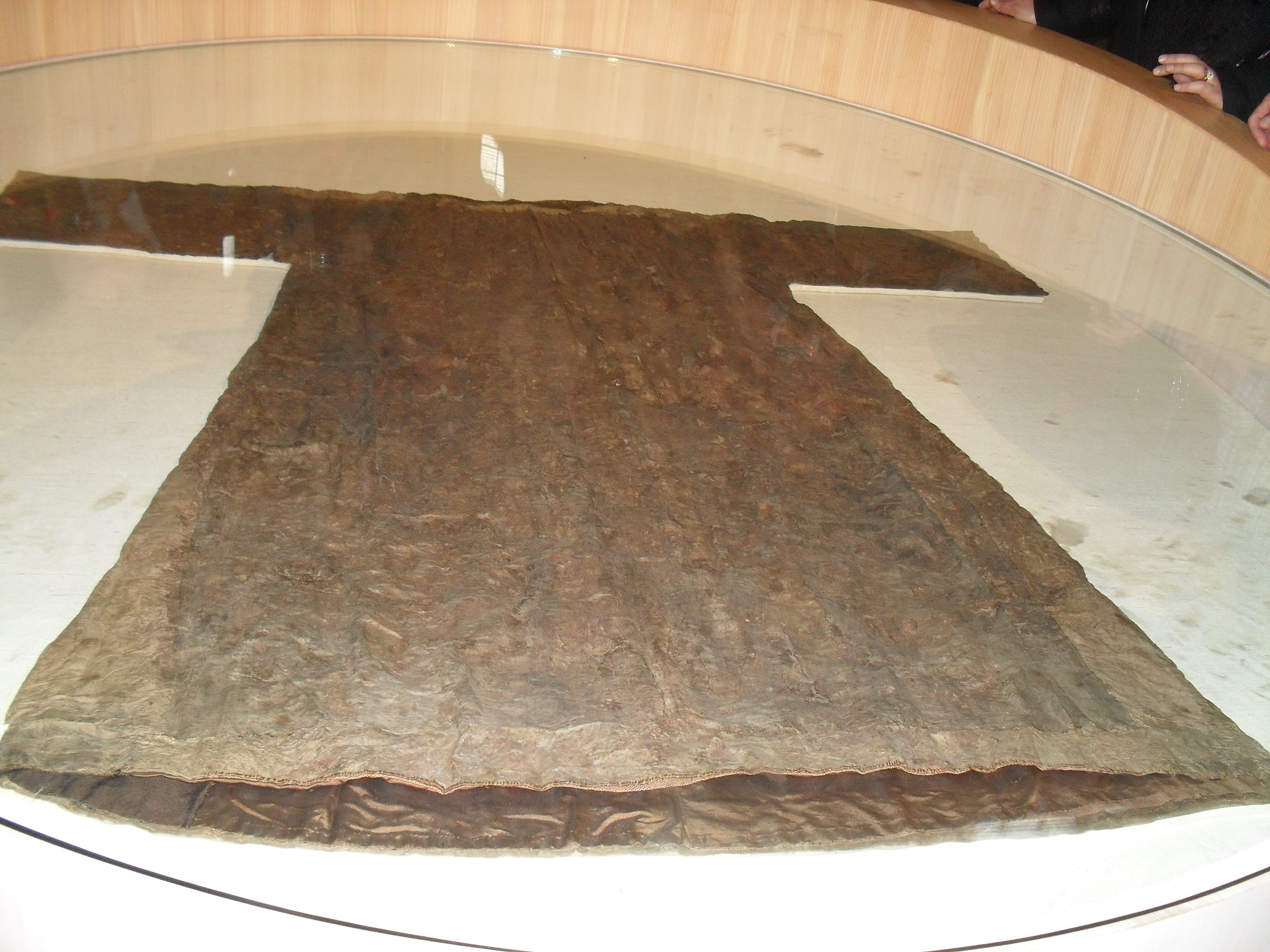
The Robe of Jesus in Trier

Orendel is a Middle High German epic poem. Composed of around 4,000 lines, it is traditionally dated to the end of the 12th century. The earliest known manuscript (1477) was lost in a fire in 1870.

== Synopsis ==
The story is associated with the town of Treves (Trier), where the poem was likely composed. The introduction recounts the tale of the Holy Coat, which, after many adventures, is swallowed by a whale. It is later recovered by Orendel, the son of King Eigel of Treves, who had set sail with twenty-two ships to court Bride, the mistress of the Holy Sepulchre, as his wife. After experiencing a shipwreck, Orendel falls into the hands of the fisherman Ise. While serving Ise, he manages to catch the whale that had swallowed the Holy Coat. The coat has the power to protect its wearer from wounds, and with its help, Orendel overcomes countless dangers and ultimately wins Bride as his wife.

... Orendel's bride, Bride, is fatherless, and as the Queen of Jerusalem she is responsible for her own decisions. She decides to marry Orendel, rules with him for a while in Jerusalem and then sets out on several adventures with her husband. In the course of these adventures, Bride is captured twice, and twice Orendel and his men free her. Her imprisonments, however, occur very late in the epic, are not related to Orendel's quest for Bride, and they cannot be compared to a return and regaining of the bride.

An angel delivers a message summoning both of them back to Treves, where Orendel undergoes numerous adventures and ultimately disposes of the Holy Coat by placing it in a stone sarcophagus. Another angel announces the impending deaths of both him and Brida, leading them to renounce the world and prepare for the end.

== Analysis ==
The author was likely a cleric, possibly residing in or near the city of Trier. The story of the Holy Coat's return to Trier is probably based on the actual event in 1196, when the Holy Coat was solemnly transferred to the new altar of Trier Cathedral.

According to scholars Marion Gibbs and Sidney M. Johnson:

Stylistically, Orendel is characterized by its paratactic organization of episodes and the repetition of poetic formulas, perhaps hinting at an oral source. The figure of Queen Bride as an active participant in the fighting in close alliance with Orendel is unusual for a pre-courtly epic.

== Publication and extant translations ==
The poem's only known manuscript, compiled in 1477 in Strasbourg, was destroyed in a fire in 1870. However, two prints from 1512 in Augsburg—one in verse and one in prose—still exist, each based on different sources, along with a handwritten copy from Berlin made in 1818. These 16th-century prints were likely created to coincide with Emperor Maximilian I's rediscovery of the seamless robe of Christ in Trier Cathedral.

The poem was edited by von der Hagen (1844), L. Ettmüller (1858) and A. E. Berger (1888). Additionally, there is a modern German translation by K. Simrock (1845). (Note: See H. Harkensee, Untersuchungen über das Spielmannsgedicht Orendel (1879); F. Vogt, in the Zeitschrift für deutsche Philologie, vol. xxii. (1890); R. Heinzel, Über das Gedicht vom König Orendel (1892); and K. Müllenhoff, in Deutsche Altertumskunde, vol. i. (2nd ed., 1890), pp. 32 seq.)

The hero's name appears under several variants across different editions: Orendel (1477 manuscript, 1512 print), Aren(n)del (1512 prose print), Erendelle (appendix of the Holy Book manuscript, destroyed in the 1870 fire), and Ernthelle (appendix of the Holy Book, circa 1483 print).
