= Christ I =

Anonymous Old English poem about the coming of Jesus Christ

- Exeter Book folio 10r, showing lines 139-71 of the poem, and the way in which the manuscript marks the section break between what modern scholars identify as lyrics 6 and 7. The image also illustrates post-medieval glossing of the poem.
- Also known as: Advent Lyrics or Christ A
- Author(s): Anonymous
- Language: Old English
- Date: Unknown, possibly around 800
- Series: Old English Christ poems, along with Christ II and Christ III
- Manuscript(s): Exeter Book, folios 8r-14r
- Genre: Religious poem in 12 subsections
- Subject: The Advent of Christ

Christ I (also known as Christ A or (The) Advent Lyrics) is a fragmentary collection of Old English poems on the coming of Jesus as preserved in the Exeter Book. In its present state, the poem comprises 439 lines in twelve distinct sections. In the assessment of Edward B. Irving Jr, "two masterpieces stand out of the mass of Anglo-Saxon religious poetry: The Dream of the Rood and the sequence of liturgical lyrics in the Exeter Book ... known as Christ I".

The topic of the poem is Advent, the time period in the annual liturgical cycle leading up to the anniversary of the coming of Jesus, a period of great spiritual and symbolic significance within the Christian churches — for some in early medieval Europe a time of fasting and the subject of a sermon by Gregory the Great (AD 590-604). The Old English lyrics of Christ I, playing off the Latin antiphons, reflect on this period of symbolic preparation.

== Manuscript and associated texts ==
Christ I is found on folios 8r-14r of the Exeter Book, a collection of Old English poetry today containing 123 folios. The collection also contains a number of other religious and allegorical poems. Some folios have been lost at the start of the poem, meaning that an indeterminate amount of the original composition is missing.

Christ I, concerning the Advent of Jesus, is followed in the Exeter Book by a poem on Jesus's Ascension composed by Cynewulf, generally known in modern scholarship as Christ II, which in turn is followed by Christ III, on the Last Judgment. Together these three poems comprise a total of 1,664 lines and are in turn linked to the poems that follow, Guthlac A and Guthlac B. The sequence of Christ I-III is sometimes known simply as Christ and has at times been thought to be one poem completed by a single author. Linguistic and stylistic differences indicate, however, that Christ I-III originated as separate compositions, perhaps with Christ II being composed as a bridge between Christ I and Christ III). Nevertheless, Christ I-III stands as an artistically coherent compilation.

The text also contains glosses by Laurence Nowell from the 16th century or George Hickes from the 17th.

== Origins ==
Because Christ II is signed by Cynewulf, earlier scholarship supposed that Christ I might also be his work; but recent research agrees that the authorship is unknown. Claes Schaar suggested that the poem may have been written between the end of the 8th century and the beginning of the 9th.

== Sample ==
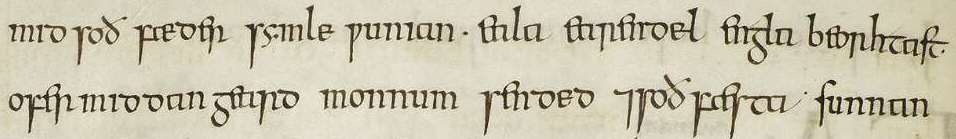
Ēala ēarendel engla beorhtast / ofer middangeard monnum sended (second half of top line, first half of second line) - Exeter Book folio 9v, top

The following passage describes the Advent of Christ and is a Modern English translation of Lyric 5 (lines 104-29 in the numbering of the Anglo-Saxon Poetic Records):

Ēala ēarendel, engla beorhtast,
ofer middangeard monnum sended,
ond sōðfæsta sunnan lēoma,
torht ofer tunglas, þū tīda gehwane
of sylfum þē symle inlihtes!
Swā þū, god of gode gearo acenned,
sunu sōþan fæder, swegles in wuldre
būtan anginne ǣfre wǣre,
swā þec nū for þearfum þīn āgen geweorc
bīdeð þurh byldo, þæt þū þā beorhtan ūs
sunnan onsende, ond þē sylf cyme
þæt ðū inlēohte þā þe longe ǣr,
þrosme beþeahte ond in þeostrum hēr,
sǣton sinneahtes; synnum bifealdne
deorc dēaþes sceadu drēogan sceoldan.
Nū wē hyhtfulle hǣlo gelyfað
þurh þæt word godes weorodum brungen,
þe on frymðe wæs fæder ælmihtigum
efenece mid god, ond nū eft gewearð
flæsc firena lēas, þæt sēo fǣmne gebær
geomrum to gēoce. God wæs mid ūs
gesewen būtan synnum; somod eardedon
mihtig meotudes bearn ond se monnes sunu
geþwǣre on þēode. Wē þæs þonc magon
secgan sigedryhtne symle bi gewyrhtum,
þæs þe he hine sylfne ūs sendan wolde.

Translation:

Hail Earendel, brightest of angels,
Sent to men over middle-earth,
And true radiance of the sun,
Fine beyond stars, you always illuminate,
From your self, every season!
As you, God born wholly of God,
Son of the true Father, were ever
In the glory of heaven without beginning,
So now your own creation awaits you
Through eternity in need, that you send
To us that bright sun, and you yourself come
So that you illuminate those who for the longest time,
Covered by smoke, and in darkness here,
Dwelled in continual night; enfolded in sins,
They had to endure the dark shadow of death.
Now we believe in joyful salvation,
Brought to people through the word of God,
Which in the beginning was from the Father almighty,
Jointly eternal with God, and now again became
The flesh without sin that the virgin bore
Through suffering to safety. God was with us,
Seen among sins; the mighty child of fate
And the son of man dwelt together,
United amidst the people. We may express
Our thanks to the Lord of victory always through our deeds,
Because he wanted to send himself to us.

== Sources and structure ==
As presented in the Exeter Book, Christ I is divided into five sections, each marked by a large capital, a line-break, and punctuation, as follows: lines 1-70, 71-163, 164-272, 275-377, 378-439.

However, researchers have found it helpful to understand Christ I as comprising twelve sections or 'lyrics'. Each lyric is introduced with a selection from a Latin antiphon (verses from Scripture sung before and after the reading of a psalm chosen to reflect the fundamental ideas presented in the psalm), followed by lines of poetry in Old English which expand on that source. Most of the antiphons used are known as the O Antiphons, which receive their name because they all begin with the Latin interjection O (rendered in the poem with the Old English interjection ēalā). Medieval manuscripts of the O Antiphons vary in order and content, meaning that the precise sources for several of the Christ I lyrics are uncertain.

Several of the Greater Antiphons are not used in Christ I, leading some scholars speculate that, since we know that the beginning of Christ I is missing, the missing antiphons ("O Sapientia", "O Adonai", and "O radix Jesse") were originally used in the poem but have been lost.

The following table summarises the content and sources of each of the twelve lyrics. Unless otherwise stated, information on sources comes from Burgert and the antiphon text from Bamberg State Library, MS Misc. Patr. 17/B.11.10, folios 133-62, 10c.

Lyric	Lines	Folios	Topic	OE incipit	Sources	Greater antiphon?
1	1-17	8r	Christ as repairer of a broken house.	lost	O, rex gentium et desideratus carus, lapisque angularis qui facis utraque unum, veni, salva hominem quem de limo formasti	Y
2	18-49	8r	Christ as redeemer of humankind and Mary's conception of Jesus.	Eala þu reccend ond þu riht cyning	O, clavis David et sceptrum domus Israel, qui aperis et nemo claudit, claudis et nemo aperit, veni et educ vinctos de domo carceris smedentes in tenebris et umbra mortis.	Y
3	50-70	8r-9r	Jerusalem's eager awaiting of Christ.	Eala sibbe gesihð, sancta Hierusalem	O, Hierusalem, civitas Dei summi, leva in circuitu oculos tuos et vide Dominum Deum tuum, ecce jam veniet solvere te a vinculo.	Y
4	71-103	9r-9v	Mary's merits and the wonder of her conception.	Eala wifa wynn geond wuldres þrym	O, virgo virginum, quomodo fiat istud, quia nec primo te similis visa es, nec habebis sequentem? Filiae Hierusalem, quid me admiramini? Divinum est mystérium hoc quod cernitis.	Y
5	104-29	9v	Christ as the morning star.	Eala earendel, engla beorhtast	O, oriens, splendor lucis aeternae et sol justiciae, veni et inlumina sedentes in tenebris et umbra mortis.	Y
6	130-63	9v-10r	Christ's redemption of humankind.	Eala gæsta god, hu þu gleawlice	O, Emmanuel, rex et legifer noster, expectatio gentium et sal vatio earum, veni ad salvandum nos, jam noli tardare.	Y
7	164-213	10r-11r	A dialogue between Joseph and Mary, as Joseph doubts Mary's virginity.	Eala Ioseph min, Iacobes bearn	O, Joseph, quomodo credidisti quod antea expavisti? Quid enim? In ea natum est de Spiritu Sancto quem Gabrihel annuncians Christum esse venturum. Matthew I:18-21	N
8	214-74	11r-11v	Christ as king.	Eala þu soða ond þu sibsuma	O rex pacifice	Y
9	275-347	11v-12v	Mary as queen of heaven.	Eala þu mæra middangeardes	O mundi domina	Y
10	348-77	12v-13r	The fulfilment of Isaiah's prophecy.	Eala þu halga heofona dryhten	Isaiah 7:14	N
11	378-415	13r-13v	Praise of the Trinity and of the Seraphim.	Eala seo wlitige, weorðmynda full	Sanctus, Sanctus, Sanctus, Dominus deus sabaoth. Pleni sunt caeli et terra gloria tua, osanna in excelsis. Benedictus qui uenit in nomine domini, osanna in excelsis The song of Seraphim (Isaias 6:3 ff. and Matthew 21:9)	N
12	416-39	13v-14r	How people should praise Christ.	Eala hwæt, þæt is wræclic wrixl in wera life	O admirabile commercium	N

== Interpretation of structure ==
The order of antiphons that the author uses for the lyrics imply that the poet was not concerned about any distinctions between antiphons, or the order that he had found them in his sources. Upon analysis of the position of each poem, no rational order can be found, suggesting that the order of each poem in the sequence is unimportant.

== Influence on other writers ==
J.R.R. Tolkien was influenced by the following lines from Christ I (lines 104-5), which inspired his portrayal of the character Eärendil in his legendarium and is one of many examples of the Old English word middangeard which partly inspired Tolkien's fantasy world:

Eálá Earendel engla beorhtast
Ofer middangeard monnum sended.

Translation:

Hail Earendel brightest of angels,
over Middle Earth sent to men.

Variants of lines inspired by these survived through multiple poetic and prose versions to be published in The Silmarillion where they appear as the greeting "Hail Eärendil, bearer of light before the Sun and Moon! Splendour of the Children of Earth, star in the darkness, jewel in the sunset, radiant in the morning!"

Tolkien wrote "There was something very remote and strange and beautiful behind those words, if I could grasp it, far beyond ancient English."

== Editions and translations ==
=== Editions ===
- Krapp, George Philip; Dobbie, Elliott Van Kirk, eds. (1936), The Exeter Book, The Anglo-Saxon Poetic Records: A Collective Edition, New York: Columbia University Press, ISBN 9780231087667, OCLC 352008, pp. 3–49; online at the Oxford Text Archive
- The Advent Lyrics of the Exeter Book, ed. by Jackson J. Campbell (Princeton: Princeton University Press, 1959)
- The Old English Advent a Typological Commentary, ed. by R. B. Burlin, Yale Studies in English, 168 (New Haven, CT, 1968)
- Old English Poetry in Facsimile Project, ed. by Foys, Martin et al. (Center for the History of Print and Digital Culture, University of Wisconsin–Madison, 2019-); poem edited in transcription and digital facsimile edition, with Modern English translation

=== Translations ===
- The Christ of Cynewulf, A Poem in Three Parts: The Advent, the Ascension, and the Last Judgement, trans. by Charles Huntington Whitman (Boston: Ginn, 1900)
- Cynewulf, Christ, trans. by Charles W. Kennedy (Cambridge, Ontario: In Parentheses, 2000)
