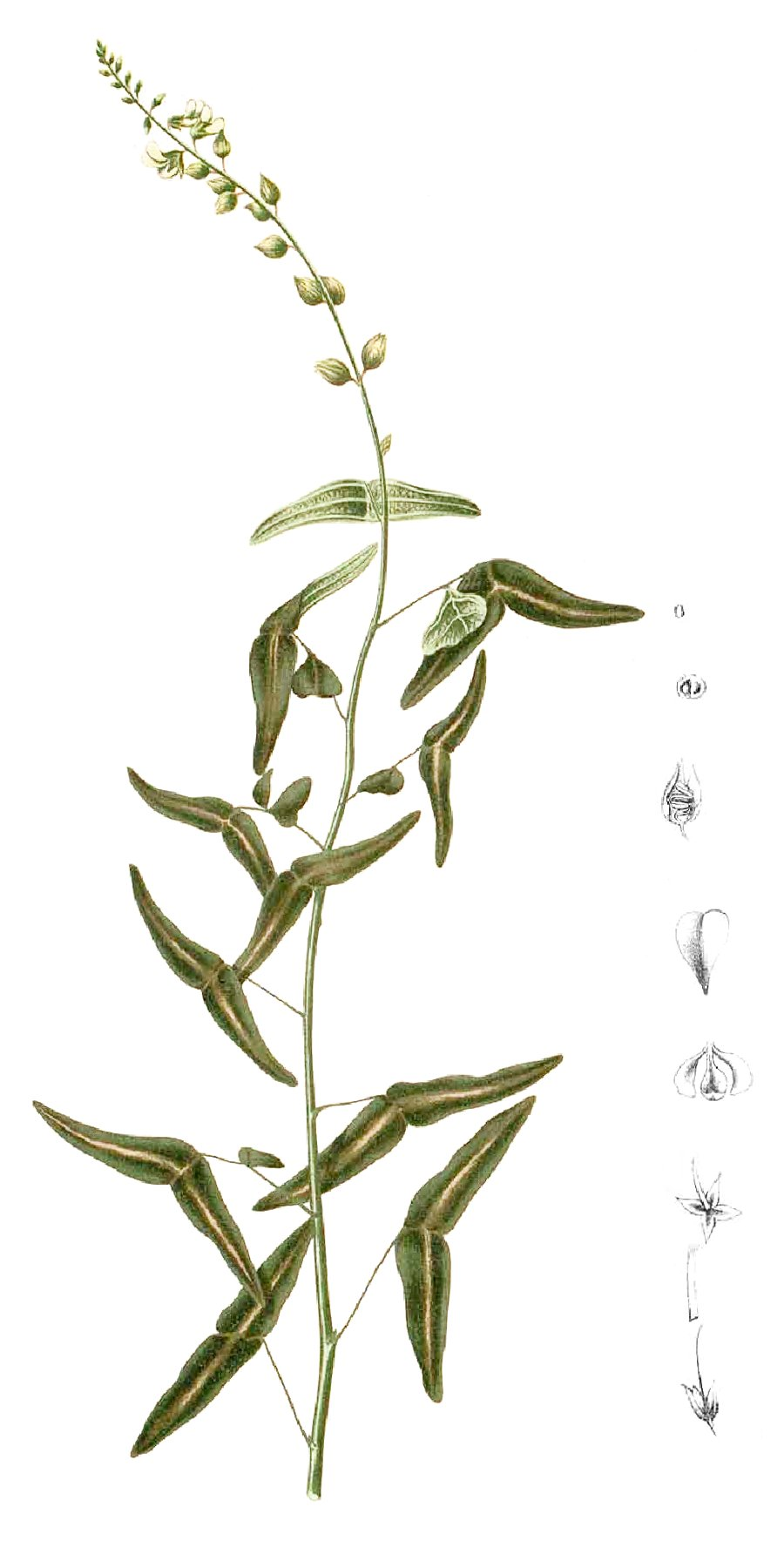
- Christia vespertilionis

Scientific classification
- Kingdom: Plantae
- Clade: Tracheophytes
- Clade: Angiosperms
- Clade: Eudicots
- Clade: Rosids
- Order: Fabales
- Family: Fabaceae
- Subfamily: Faboideae
- Tribe: Desmodieae
- Subtribe: Desmodiinae
- Genus: Christia; Moench

Synonyms
- Lourea Neck. ex Desv.; Ploca Lour. ex Gomes

= Christia =

Genus of legumes

Christia is a genus of flowering plants in the family Fabaceae. It belongs to the subfamily Faboideae.

== Geographical distribution ==
Tropical & Subtropical Asia, including:

- Ryukyu Islands
- Taiwan
- Indochina
- Malaysia
- Indonesia
- Vietnam
- Laos
- Cambodia
- Thailand
- India
- China
- Northern Australia

The genus is also naturalized in Fiji and on some Caribbean islands such as St. Vincent, Martinique, Jamaica and St. Kitts.

== Species ==
Species accepted by Plants of the World Online as of March 2024:

- Christia australasica (Schindl.) Bakh.f.
- Christia constricta (Schindl.) T.C.Chen
- Christia convallaria (Schindl.) Ohashi
- Christia hainanensis Yen C.Yang & P.H.Huang
- Christia lychnucha (Schindl.) Ohashi
- Christia obcordata (Poir.) Bakh.f.
- Christia paniculata (Wall. ex Benth.) Thoth.
- Christia parviflora (Schindl.) Bakh.f.
- Christia pierrei (Schindl.) Ohashi
- Christia vespertilionis (L.f.) Bakh.f.
- Christia zollingeri (Schindl.) Bakh.f.
