= Kristi =

Kristi may refer to:

- Kristi (given name), a proper name
- Kristi language, a Portuguese creole language spoken in India
