= 1015 Christa =

Asteroid

Discovery
- Discovered by: K. Reinmuth
- Discovery site: Heidelberg Obs.
- Discovery date: 31 January 1924

Designations
- Named after: unknown
- Alternative designations: 1924 QF · A916 UE
- Minor planet category: main-belt · (outer) background

Orbital characteristics
- Epoch 23 March 2018 (JD 2458200.5)
- Uncertainty parameter 0
- Observation arc: 93.42 yr (34,123 d)
- Aphelion: 3.4848 AU
- Perihelion: 2.9262 AU
- Semi-major axis: 3.2055 AU
- Eccentricity: 0.0871
- Orbital period (sidereal): 5.74 yr (2,096 d)
- Mean anomaly: 232.16°
- Mean motion: 0° 10^{m} 18.12^{s} / day
- Inclination: 9.4449°
- Longitude of ascending node: 120.15°
- Argument of perihelion: 286.50°

Physical characteristics
- Mean diameter: 99.77±2.46 km (composite estimate) Individual estimates: 82.350±1.096 km; 95.51±27.79 km; 96.592±2.896 km; 96.94±3.6 km; 99.88±36.30 km; 101.04±1.37 km
- Mass: (9.0±9.0)×10^{17} kg (Note: Calculated from its standard gravitational parameter GM = 0.06±0.06 km^{3}/s^{2}.) (SB441)
- Mean density: 1.7–3.1 g/cm^{3} (calculated)
- Synodic rotation period: 11.230±0.004 h (Note: Lightcurve plot of (1015) Christa, Palmer Divide Observatory, B. D. Warner (2009). Summary figures at the LCDB); 12.189±0.001 h
- Geometric albedo: 0.04±0.04; 0.042±0.001; 0.0459±0.004; 0.0463±0.0062; 0.048±0.009; 0.064±0.016
- Spectral type: Tholen = C SMASS = Xc · P B–V = 0.693; U–B = 0.320
- Absolute magnitude (H): 9.03; 9.13 · 9.46±0.45

1015 Christa, provisional designation 1924 QF, is a dark background asteroid from the outermost regions of the asteroid belt, approximately 96 kilometers (60 miles) in diameter. It was discovered on 31 January 1924, by German astronomer Karl Reinmuth at the Heidelberg-Königstuhl State Observatory in southwest Germany. The meaning of this asteroids's name is unknown.

== Orbit and classification ==
Christa is a non-family asteroid from the main belt's background population. It orbits the Sun in the outermost asteroid belt at a distance of 2.9–3.5 AU once every 5 years and 9 months (2,096 days; semi-major axis of 3.21 AU). Its orbit has an eccentricity of 0.09 and an inclination of 9° with respect to the ecliptic.

The asteroid was first observed as A916 UE at the Simeiz Observatory in October 1916. The body's observation arc begins at Heidelberg in February 1924, two days after its official discovery observation.

== Physical characteristics ==
In the Tholen classification, Christa is a common C-type asteroid, while in the SMASS classification, it is a Xc-subtype that transitions from the carbonaceous C-type to the X-type asteroids. It has also been characterized as a primitive P-type asteroid by the Wide-field Infrared Survey Explorer (WISE).

=== Rotation period ===
In April 2005, a first rotational lightcurve of Christa was obtained from photometric observations by French amateur astronomers Raymond Poncy and René Roy. Lightcurve analysis gave a rotation period of 12.189 hours with a brightness variation of 0.20 magnitude (U=2). In January 2009, a refined period of 11.230 hours and an amplitude of 0.12 magnitude was measured by photometrist Brian Warner at his Palmer Divide Observatory in Colorado, United States (U=3-).

=== Diameter and albedo ===
According to the surveys carried out by the Infrared Astronomical Satellite IRAS, the Japanese Akari satellite and the NEOWISE mission of NASA's WISE telescope, Christa measures between 82.35 and 101.04 kilometers in diameter and its surface has a low albedo between 0.04 and 0.064. The Collaborative Asteroid Lightcurve Link adopts the results obtained by IRAS, that is, an albedo of 0.0459 with a diameter of 96.94 kilometers based on an absolute magnitude of 9.03.

1015 Christa has been observed to occult 8 stars between 2005 and 2023.

== Naming ==
Any reference of Christa's name to a person or occurrence is unknown. It is one of 120 minor planets for which no official naming citation has been published. All of these low-numbered asteroids have numbers between 164 Eva and 1514 Ricouxa and were discovered between 1876 and the 1930s, predominantly by astronomers Auguste Charlois, Johann Palisa, Max Wolf and Karl Reinmuth.
