= Max Koch (academic) =

German historian and literary critic (1855–1931)

- Born: 22 December 1855; Munich, Bavaria
- Died: 19 December 1931 (aged 75); Wrocław, Lower Silesia, Germany
- Education: Ludwig-Maximilians-Universität München (PhD)
- Occupations: Historian; literary critic; professor

Max Koch (22 December 1855 – 19 December 1931) was a German historian and literary critic.

== Biography ==
He studied at the Ludwig-Maximilians-Universität München as a student of Michael Bernays, receiving his PhD in 1878. Subsequently, he continued his education in Berlin, London, and Paris, and became a docent at Marburg University in 1879. He was appointed an assistant professor of literary history at the University of Breslau in 1890, where in 1895 he became a full professor. In 1918, he was named university rector.

== Work ==
- Helferich Peter Sturz : nebst einer Abhandlung über die schleswigischen Literaturbriefe mit Benützung handschriftlicher Quellen (Munich, 1879) – Helfrich Peter Sturz : together with a treatise on Schleswig literature letters, etc..
- Ueber die Beziehungen der englischen Literatur zur deutschen im 18. Jahrhundert (Leipzig, 1883) – On the relationship of English literature for Germans in the 18th century.
- Shakespeares Leben – Shakespeare's life.
- Franz Grillparzer. Eine charakteristik (1891) – On Franz Grillparzer.
- Nationalität und Nationallitteratur (1891) – Nationality and national literature.
- Geschichte der deutschen Literatur von den ältesten Zeiten bis zur Gegenwart (1897, with Friedrich Vogt) – History of German literature from the earliest times to the present.
- Richard Wagner (3 volumes, 1907–18) – Biography of Richard Wagner.

=== Compilations ===
- Goethe and Schiller literature for Goedeke's Grundriss
- Shakespeare and Chamisso for Cotta's Bibliothek der Weltliteratur
- Von Arnim, Brentano, Eichendorff, Fouqué, Hoffmann, Schulze, Immermann and Lenau for Joseph Kürschner's Deutsche National Literatur

He founded Zeitschrift für vergleichende Literaturgeschichte (Berlin, 1886, later Weimar).
