= Christ (disambiguation) =

Christ is a title given to Jesus, in his role as the Jewish Messiah in Christianity.

Christ may also refer to:

== Religion ==
- Christ (title), a title for the saviour and redeemer who would bring salvation to the Jewish people and mankind
- Christ Child, Jesus as a child in the Holy Family
- Christ Pantocrator, a specific depiction of Christ, one of the names of God

== Art, entertainment, and media ==
- Christ figure, a stock character that draws allusions to biblical Jesus
- Christ, Old English poetic triad:
  - Christ I, anonymous collection of poems
  - Christ II, poem by Cynewulf
  - Christ III, anonymous poem
- Pensive Christ, a subject in Christian iconography

=== Music ===
- Christ 0, 2006 studio album of Vanden Plas
- Christ – The Album, the fourth album by English punk band Crass, released in 1982
- Christ: The Bootleg, live recording by Crass
- Christ. (musician), Scottish electronic music artist
- Christus (Liszt), an oratorio by Franz Liszt

== Other uses ==
- Christ (surname)
- Christ Klep, Dutch military historian
- Christ Tshiunza (born 2002), rugby union player
- Christ Inao Oulaï (born 2006), Ivorian footballer

== See also ==
- Christos (disambiguation)
- Christus (disambiguation)
- Jesus (disambiguation)
- Jesus Christ (disambiguation)
- Jesus of Nazareth (disambiguation)
- Messiah (disambiguation)
