= Christo Albertyn Smith =

South African botanist (1898–1956)

- Born: 26 April 1898; Boksburg, South African Republic
- Died: 23 November 1956 (aged 58); Canberra, Australia
- Education: University of Stellenbosch
- Known for: Common names of South African plants
- Spouse: Bertha Edith Thorold
- Children: Lillemor Elizabeth Smith; Christopher John Smith
- Scientific career
- Fields: Botany
- Workplaces: Kew Herbarium, London; Natal Witness, Pietermaritzburg; Division of Plant Science, Pretoria

Christo Albertyn Smith (1898–1956) was a South African botanist. He co-wrote a definitive dictionary of common names of South African plants, although it was only published after his death.

== Education and career ==
Smith was born in Boksburg, South Africa in 1898. He completed his BSc in 1920 at the University of Stellenbosch after which he worked as a high school biology teacher (1921–1924). He joined the professional staff of the Division of Plant Science of the National Herbarium in Pretoria in 1925 and became Botanical Liaison officer at the Kew Herbarium in London from 1928 to 1931. During his career he collected 4600 samples of flora including Crassulaceae, Fabaceae, Amaranthaceae, Vitaceae, Asteraceae, Celastraceae, Scrophulariaceae, Brassicaceae, Scilloideae, Oleaceae, Geraniaceae, Poaceae, Portulacaceae and Rutaceae, most of which were stored in Pretoria and Kew. He resigned from his post in Pretoria in 1931 when he was "found guilty of appropriation from the Herbarium,” having taken over 1,000 specimens, portions of specimens, drawings and letters from Kew to Pretoria.

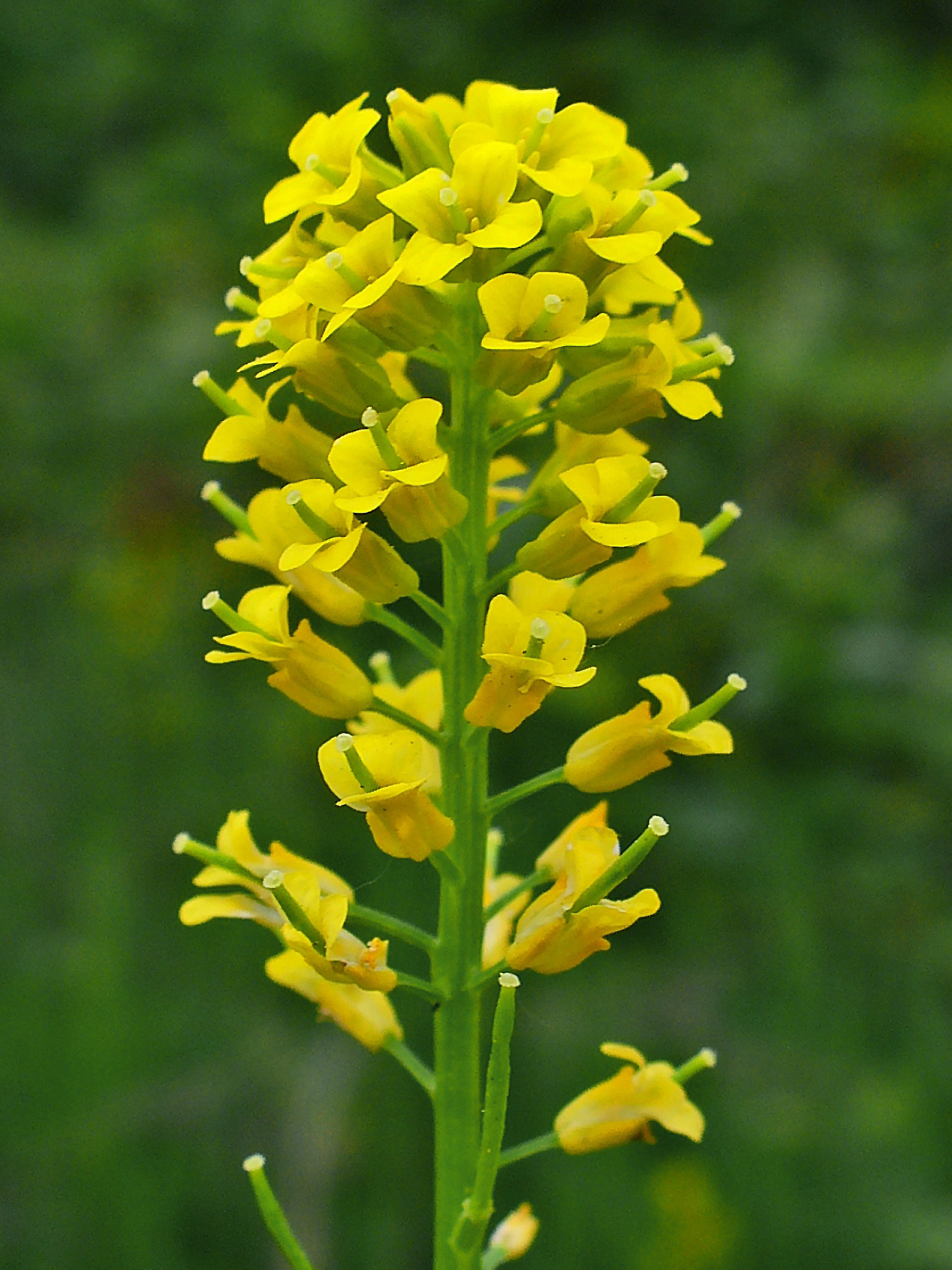
Brassicaceae: Winter cress, Barbarea vulgaris

From 1931, Smith entered journalism. He worked as agricultural editor for the Natal Witness in Pietermaritzburg, South Africa.

He worked for the Department of State Information, South Africa from 1946 and was posted to Canberra, Australia as Information Officer in 1954.

He died in 1956 in Canberra, Australia.

== Selected publications ==
- Albizia gummifera Smith, C.A. Bulletin of Miscellaneous Information, Royal Gardens, Kew 1930(5): 218. 1930
- Smith, C.A.; Phillips, E.P.; Van Hoepen, E. (1966). Common names of South African plants. Botanical Survey memoir No. 35. Department of Agricultural Technical Services.

== Sources ==
- Mosley, Charles (2003). Burke's Peerage, Baronetage & Knightage. Burke's Peerage & Baronetage (107 ed.). Wilmington, Delaware, U.S.A.: Burke's Peerage (Genealogical Books) Ltd. ISBN 978-1-57958-083-4.
