= Christo Niewoudt =

South African cricketer

Christo Niewoudt is a former South African cricketer. He was a right-handed batsman and a leg-break bowler who played for Limpopo.

Niewoudt made a single first-class appearance and a single List A appearance in the South African Airways Provincial Challenge competitions of 2006–07. Bowling in the upper-middle order, he scored 22 runs in two first-class innings, and 32 not out in the only first-class innings in which he bowled.

Niewoudt bowled 36 complete overs in his only first-class appearance, taking figures of 4–75.
