= Friedrich Vogt =

German philologist

Friedrich Hermann Traugott Vogt (11 March 1851, in Greifswald – 28 October 1923, in Marburg) was a German philologist. He was the son of theologian Karl August Traugott Vogt (1808–1869).

From 1868 he studied German language and literature at the universities of Greifswald, Tübingen and Leipzig, then from 1873 worked at university libraries in Göttingen and Greifswald. In 1874 he obtained his habilitation for German philology, and in 1883 became an associate professor at the University of Greifswald. Later on, he served as a full professor at the universities of Kiel (from 1884), Breslau (from 1889) and Marburg (from 1902). In 1894 he was a founding member of the Schlesische Gesellschaft für Volkskunde (Silesian Society of Folklore).

== Selected works ==
- Die Letanîe. Ein Beitrag zur deutschen Literaturgeschichte, 1873 – The Letanîe; a contribution to the history of German literature.
- Des Minnesangs Frühling; 4th edition, 1888 (with Karl Lachmann; Moriz Haupt) – The Minnesang spring.
- Geschichte der mittelhochdeutschen Literatur, 1890 – History of Middle High German literature.
- Geschichte der deutschen Literatur von den ältesten Zeiten bis zur Gegenwart, 1897 (with Max Koch) – History of German literature from the earliest times to the present.
- Die schlesischen weihnachtspiele, 1901 – Silesian Christmas games.
