= Christopher R. Fee =

American philologist

Christopher R. Fee is an American philologist and medievalist. He is a professor of English at Gettysburg College.

== Biography ==
An alumnus of Saint Edward High School, the English Departments of Loyola University Chicago and Baldwin-Wallace College, and the Medieval Studies Program of the University of Connecticut, Christopher R. Fee received his Ph.D. in English Language at the University of Glasgow, where he taught Old English, Old Norse, historical linguistics and other topics. Fee has since served as Professor of English and Chair of the English Department at Gettysburg College.

From 2008 to 2011, he was Johnson Distinguished Teaching Professor in the Humanities at Gettysburg College. In 2012, Fee was named one of the 300 Best Professors in America by the Princeton Review. In 2012, 2015, and 2016, Fee was a visiting faculty member in Copenhagen at the Danish Institute for Study Abroad. He has written numerous works on the subjects of Anglo-Saxon paganism and Old English literature, and is known as an authority on dragons.

He is also editor of the Encyclopedia of Conspiracies & Conspiracy Theories in American History and the Encyclopedia of American Myth, Legend, and Folklore.
