= O Antiphons =

Christian short chant

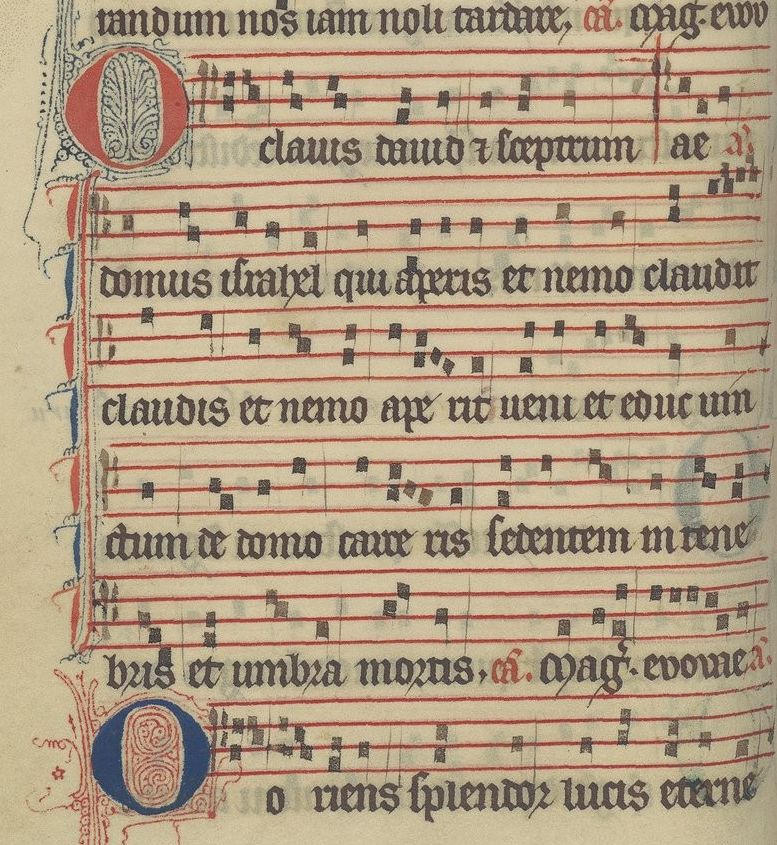
The antiphon O clavis David in an antiphonal

The O Antiphons (also known as the Great Advent Antiphons or Great Os) are antiphons used at Vespers during the Magnificat on the last seven days of Advent in Western Christian traditions. They likely date to sixth-century Italy, when Boethius refers to the text in The Consolation of Philosophy. They subsequently became one of the key musical features of the days leading up to Christmas.

In the English-speaking world they are best known in their amalgamated form as the 18th-century hymn "O Come, O Come, Emmanuel".

== Sequence ==
Each text, in the original Latin, begins with the vocative particle "O". Each antiphon is a title of Christ, one of his attributes mentioned in Scripture. They are:

- 17 December: O Sapientia (O Wisdom)
- 18 December: O Adonai
- 19 December: O Radix Jesse (O Root of Jesse)
- 20 December: O Clavis David (O Key of David)
- 21 December: O Oriens (O Dawn of the East)
- 22 December: O Rex Gentium (O King of the Nations)
- 23 December: O Emmanuel

In the Roman rite, the O Antiphons are sung or recited for the Magnificat at Vespers from 17 December to 23 December.

== Origin ==
The antiphon texts are believed to have originated in Italy in or before the sixth century. Boethius's Consolation of Philosophy includes a passage in which Lady Philosophy appears to cite the series:

Est igitur summum, inquit, bonum quod regit cuncta fortiter suauiterque disponit.

Translation:

He is the highest good, she said, that rules all things mightily and delightfully arranges them.

The underlying reference is to Wisdom 8:1, but the precise phrasing almost certainly refers to O sapientia.

There were many later traditions throughout the Middle Ages surrounding their performance, and Amalarius wrote a detailed commentary on them in the ninth century.

The first letters of the titles, from last to first, appear to form a Latin acrostic, Ero cras, meaning 'Tomorrow, I will be [there]', mirroring the theme of the antiphons. This is formed from the first letter of each title – Emmanuel, Rex, Oriens, Clavis, Radix, Adonai, Sapientia. Such acrostics were popular among early medieval writers, and some scholars have taken this as further evidence for their antiquity, but this view is not universally accepted.

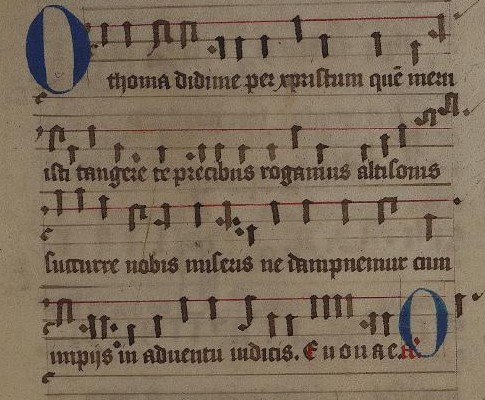
The added post-Christmas O antiphon 'O Thoma Didyme'

A number of other antiphons were found in various medieval breviaries.

== Analysis ==
Each antiphon has the following structure:

- a Messianic title preceded by "O". Example: "O Wisdom"
- elaboration of the title: "coming forth from the mouth of the Most High, reaching from one end to the other, mightily and sweetly ordering all things"
- the verb "come"
- elaboration of the request to come: "and teach us the way of prudence."

Below is the traditional Latin text of each antiphon, as well as the English text from the Church of England's Common Worship liturgy.

Each antiphon is a cento of passages from the Bible. In the text of each antiphon below, the passages from the Bible are indicated by underlining, and the quotation in the footnote is from the Vulgate (for Latin passages) or (for English passages) the NRSV unless indicated otherwise.

=== O Sapientia ===
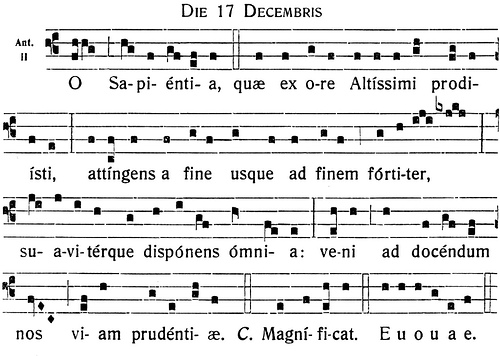
O Sapientia, the first great antiphon of Advent

Latin:
O Sapientia,
quae ex ore Altissimi prodiisti,
attingens a fine usque ad finem,
fortiter suaviterque disponens omnia:
veni ad docendum nos viam prudentiae.

Translation:

English (Anglican):
O Wisdom,
coming forth from the mouth of the Most High,
reaching from one end to the other,
mightily and sweetly ordering all things:
Come and teach us the way of prudence.

=== O Adonai ===
Latin:
O Adonai, et Dux domus Israel,
qui Moysi in igne flammae rubi apparuisti,
et ei in Sina legem dedisti:
veni ad redimendum nos in brachio extento.

Translation:

English (Anglican):
O Adonai, and leader of the House of Israel,
who appeared to Moses in the fire of the burning bush,
and gave him the law on Sinai:
Come and redeem us with an outstretched arm.

=== O Radix Jesse ===
Latin:
O radix Jesse,
qui stas in signum populorum,
super quem continebunt reges os suum,
quem Gentes deprecabuntur:
veni ad liberandum nos, jam noli tardare.

Translation:

English (Anglican):
O Root of Jesse,
standing as a sign among the peoples;
before you kings will shut their mouths,
to you the nations will make their prayer:
Come and deliver us, and delay no longer.

=== O Clavis David ===
Latin:
O Clavis David, et sceptrum domus Israel;
qui aperis, et nemo claudit;
claudis, et nemo aperit:
veni, et educ vinctum de domo carceris,
sedentem in tenebris et umbra mortis.

Translation:

English (Anglican):
O Key of David and sceptre of the House of Israel;
you open and no one can shut;
you shut and no one can open:
Come and lead the prisoners from the prison house,
those who dwell in darkness and the shadow of death.

=== O Oriens ===
Latin:
O Oriens,
splendor lucis aeternae, et sol justitiae:
veni, et illumina sedentes in tenebris, et umbra mortis.

Translation:

English (Anglican):
O Morning Star,
splendour of light eternal and sun of righteousness:
Come and enlighten those who dwell in darkness and the shadow of death.

=== O Rex gentium ===
Latin:
O Rex Gentium, et desideratus earum,
lapisque angularis, qui facis utraque unum:
veni, et salva hominem,
quem de limo formasti.

Translation:

English (Anglican):
O King of the nations, and their desire,
the cornerstone making both one:
Come and save the human race,
which you fashioned from clay.

=== O Emmanuel ===
Latin:
O Emmanuel, Rex et legifer noster,
exspectatio Gentium, et Salvator earum:
veni ad salvandum nos, Domine, Deus noster.

Translation:

English (Anglican):
O Emmanuel, our king and our lawgiver,
the hope of the nations and their Saviour:
Come and save us, O Lord our God.

== Other Antiphons ==
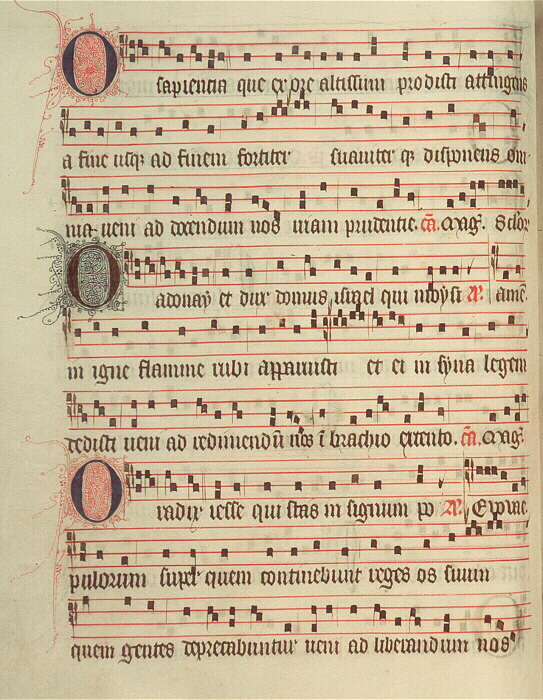
O antiphons in the Poissy Antiphonal, folio 30v

In addition to the seven antiphons above, a number of other O antiphons have been in use over the centuries in different churches: “O Virgo virginum”, "O Gabriel, nuntius cœlorum", "O Thoma Didyme", “O Rex pacifice”, "O Mundi Domina", “O Hierusalem”, "O sancte sanctorum", “O pastor Israel”. The Parisian Rite had 9 antiphons beginning on December 15, and some other churches had 12 antiphons. A feature of these is that most of them were not addressed to the Messiah. And they were independent of each other, unlike the seven O antiphons described above that formed a self-contained group (as can be seen from the acrostic Ero cras).

An English medieval practice was to add an eighth antiphon – O Virgo virginum – on December 23, and move the others back one day, thus beginning the series on 16 December. The acrostic then became Vero cras ("Truly, tomorrow").

Latin:
O Virgo virginum, quomodo fiet istud?
Quia nec primam similem visa es nec habere sequentem.
Filiae Jerusalem, quid me admiramini?
Divinum est mysterium hoc quod cernitis.

Translation:

English (Anglican):
O Virgin of virgins, how shall this be?
For neither before thee was any like thee, nor shall there be after.
Daughters of Jerusalem, why marvel ye at me?
The thing which ye behold is a divine mystery.

Given the English origins of this alternative, it has traditionally been the version used in the Church of England (including Canterbury Cathedral) until recent times, and is the version printed in traditional Church of England liturgical sources including The English Hymnal (1906) and The New English Hymnal (1986). From 2000, however, the Church of England appears to have taken an official step away from English medieval practice towards the more widely spread custom, as Common Worship makes provision for the sevenfold version of the antiphons, and not the eightfold version.

The chant repertory knows also other antiphons built using the musical model of O antiphons, but not related to the Advent season - O doctor optime (Common of Doctors of the church), O Rex gloriae (Ascension).

== Current practice ==
In the Catholic Church, the seven standard O antiphons continue to serve as Magnificat antiphons at Vespers from 17 to 23 December. Since the liturgical reforms following Vatican II, they are also used as the Alleluia verses for Mass in the Ordinary Form on the same days. For the Alleluia verses, the Lectionary moves O Emmanuel to the 21st, uses Rex Gentium on both the 22nd and 23rd, and places O Oriens on the morning of the 24th, but the traditional ordering from the 17th through the 23rd is also permitted.

The Catholic personal ordinariates follow the practice for days from the 17th to the 23rd (Magnificat antiphon at Evensong and Alleluia Verse at Mass, either in the traditional order as indicated in Divine Worship: The Missal or in the order indicated in the Lectionary, but also use O Virgo virginum on the morning of 24 December, both as the Benedictus antiphon at morning prayer and as the Alleluia verse at Mass.

Some Anglican churches, such as the Church of England, use the O Antiphons at evensong; often according to medieval English usage, beginning on 16 December.

In 1986, St. Mark's Episcopal Cathedral, Seattle conceived a special Advent liturgy using the O Antiphons, which has remained in practice every year since.

Use of the O Antiphons also occurs in many Lutheran churches. For example, an English translation of "The Great O Antiphons" appears with the hymn O Come, O Come, Emmanuel in Evangelical Lutheran Worship and the Lutheran Service Book. In the Book of Common Worship published by the Presbyterian Church (USA), the antiphons can be read as a praise litany at Morning or Evening Prayer.

== Musical settings ==
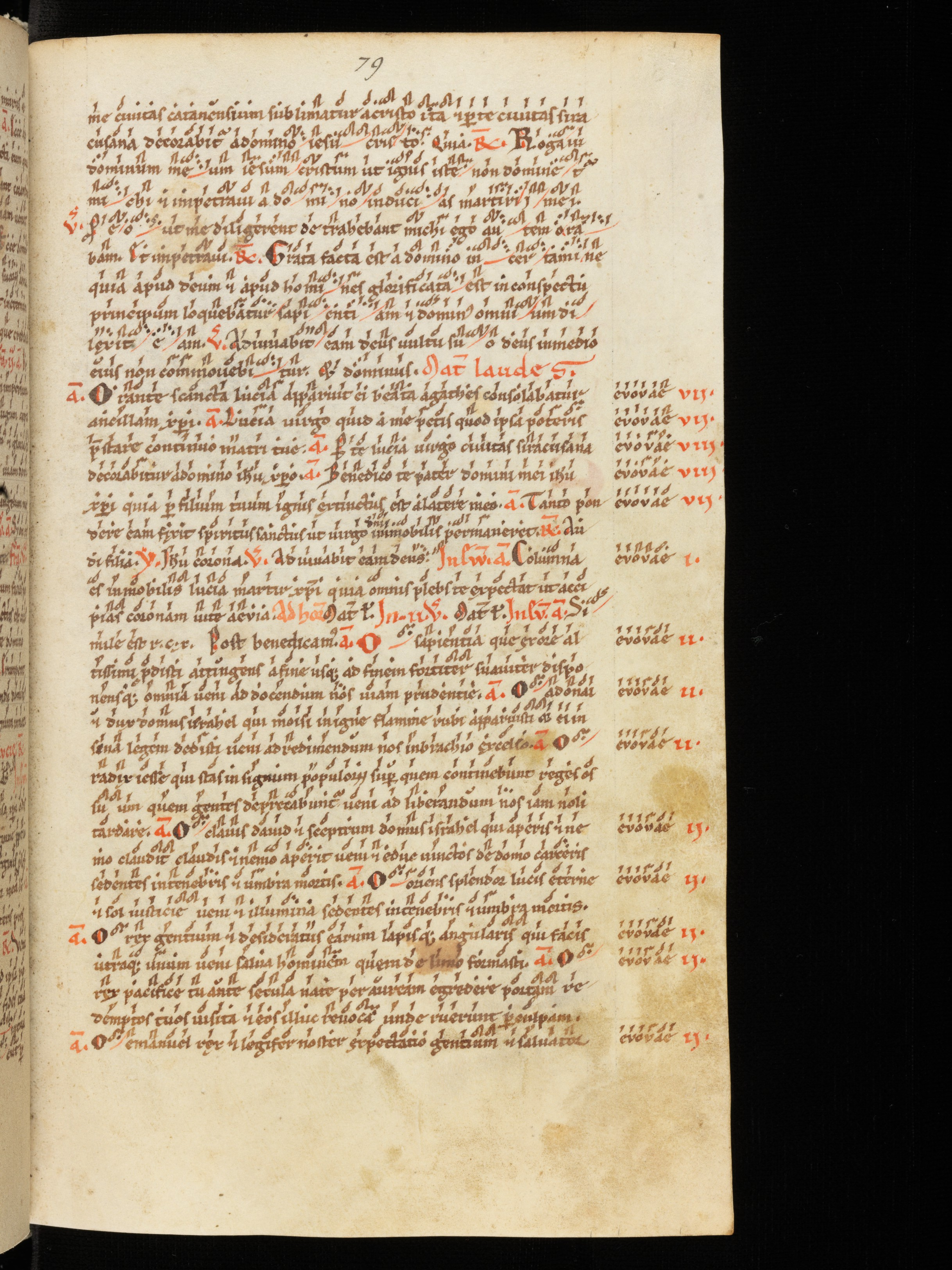
O antiphons in a thirteenth-century breviary

- Carlo Gesualdo, O Oriens (1603)
- Jean-Baptiste Geoffroy, Les Antiennes Ô de l'Avent, with basso continuo
- Marc-Antoine Charpentier, 7 Antiennes Ô, H 36–43, completed in the early 1690s
- Louis Nicolas Clérambault, 7 Antiennes Ô C.221–227 (1700)
- Louis Charles Grénon, 7 Antiennes Ô (1766)
- Ralph Vaughan Williams, plainsong setting in English, published in The English Hymnal
- Herman Strategier, Dutch composer and organist, Cantica pro tempore natali (1953).
- Arvo Pärt, Estonian composer, Sieben Magnificat-Antiphonen für gemischten Chor a cappella
- Bob Chilcott, British composer, Advent Antiphons, in Latin, for unaccompanied SSAATTBB
- Paweł Łukaszewski, Polish composer, (1995–1999)
- Peter Hallock, American composer of music in the Episcopalian and Anglican traditions, two settings, 1986 and 1989
- Healey Willan, Anglo-Canadian composer, whose setting is in use throughout the Anglican Communion
- James MacMillan, Scottish composer, has set to music an English paraphrase of the antiphon O Oriens ('O Radiant Dawn') as part of his Strathclyde Motets. The setting borrows harmony from Thomas Tallis's motet O nata lux.

== See also ==
- Christ I

== Media ==
- Antiphon "O Sapientia quae ex ore Altissimi"
- Antiphon O Adonai II Great Advent Antiphon
- "BinAural Collaborative Hypertest".
  - "Sapientia". Archived from the original on July 6, 2008.
  - "Adonai". Archived from the original on 20 May 2007.
  - "Radix Jesse". Archived from the original on 24 August 2007.
  - "Oriens". Archived from the original on 24 August 2007.
  - "Rex Gentium". Archived from the original on 25 August 2007.
