= Crist (poems) =

Set of three Old English religious poems in the Exeter Book

Crist (Old English for Christ) is the title of any of three Old English religious poems in the Exeter Book. They were initially believed to be a three-part work by a single late 9th and early 10th century author, but more recent scholarship has argued that the works are more likely of differing origins.

Crist I (also Crist A or Advent Lyrics), a poem in twelve sections on Christ's Advent written by an unknown author (or authors).
Crist II (also Crist B or The Ascension), a poem on Christ's Ascension written by the Anglo-Saxon poet Cynewulf.
Crist III (also Crist C), a poem on the Last Judgment written by an unknown author.

== Editions ==
- Foys, Martin et al. (ed.).Old English Poetry in Facsimile Project. Center for the History of Print and Digital Culture, University of Wisconsin-Madison, 2019-); all three poems edited in transcription and digital facsimile editions, with Modern English translations
