= Surfing World Magazine =

Surfing World
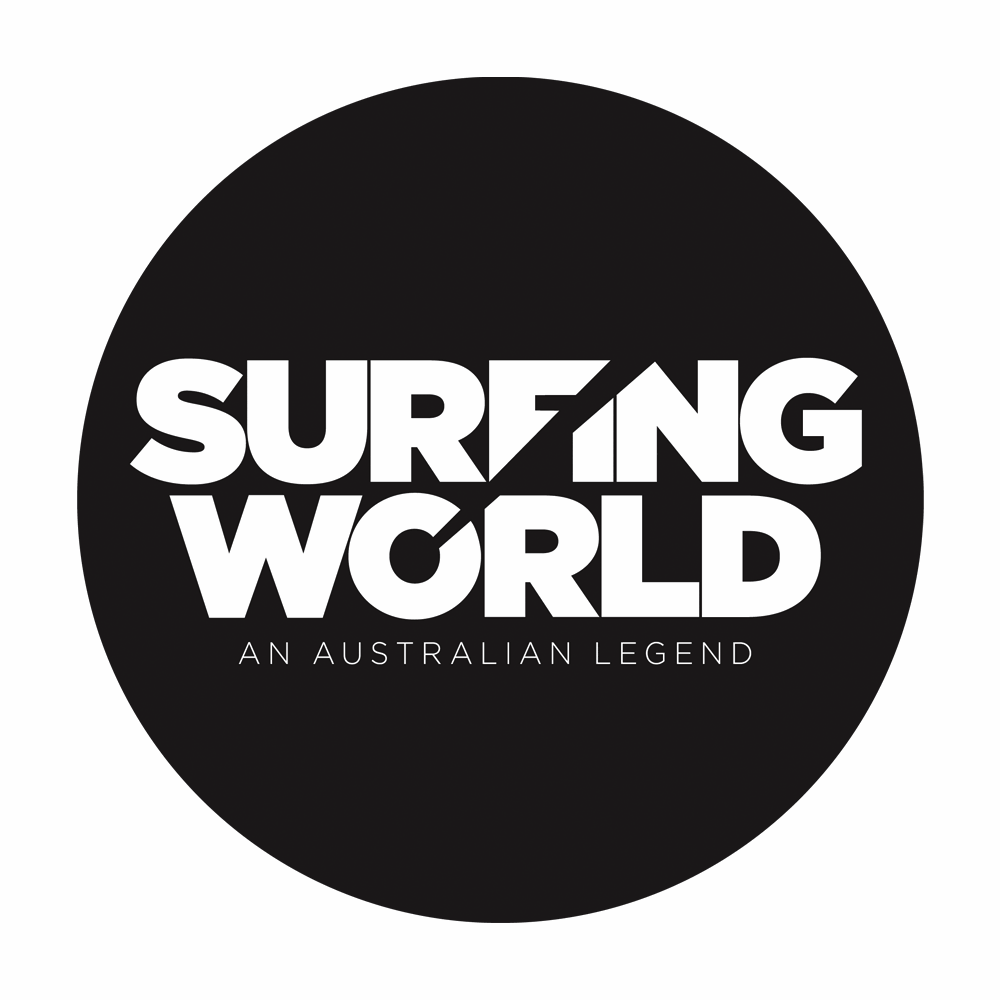
- Editor: Vaughan Blakey
- Photographer: Jon Frank
- Categories: Surfing Magazine
- Frequency: Quarterly
- Publisher: Doug Lees
- Founder: Bob Evans
- First issue: September 1962
- Company: Breaker Publications
- Country: Australia
- Based in: Avalon, New South Wales
- Language: English
- Website: surfingworld.com.au
- ISSN: 2652-869X

Surfing World is the longest running Australian surf publication, and the second longest in the world, dedicated to sharing the stoke of surfing. It was first published in 1962 and includes both informative and humorous features on surfing and the coastal lifestyle.

== Overview ==
Surfing World was founded by Bob Evans and first published September 1962, under the title Surfing World Monthly. Brian Alford was the first surfer to feature on the cover the covers with a wave at the northern-nsw point of Angourie. Only 17 years old, the local from Yamba, who was featured as an ‘unknown kid’, beat surfers such as Nat Young to the honour.

Over the years, numerous surfing legends have been on the covers of SW. International retro stars such as Simon Anderson, Wayne ‘Rabbit’ Bartholomew, Terry Fitzgerald, Mark Richards and Nat Young featured as cover surfers. In the late 1990s the new age surfing of Matt Hoy, Kelly Slater and Barton Lynch, and futuristic free surfers such as Craig Anderson, Dane Reynolds and Ryan Callinan also featured on the cover.

The magazine celebrated their 50-year anniversary in 2012. They featured over 300 surfers on the front page of their publication in over 330 issues. The magazine frequency has varied significantly, at times featuring as a bimestrial and monthly publication in different years.

Current editor, Vaughan Blakey's first magazine as editor of SW (no. 289) signaled a re-launch for the magazine. Starring an Ozzie Wright hand illustrated Jesus riding a barrel, this represented Vaughan's new outlook on the way the publication was heading, whilst understanding its heritage and style.

In 2020, the magazine was sold to Sean Doherty.
