= Claes Schaar =

Swedish literary historian

Claes Schaar (1920 – 2012) was a Swedish literary historian.

He studied at Lund University and took the doctorate in 1949 with the thesis Critical Studies in the Cynewulf Group. He later studied Chaucer and Shakespeare; later issuing Marino and Crashaw. ospetto d’Herode: A Commentary (1971) and The Full Voic’d Quire Below: Vertical Context Systems in Paradise Lost (1982). He was professor of English literature at Lund University from 1964 to 1986. He was a member of the Norwegian Academy of Science and Letters from 1988; also The Society of Sciences in Lund and the Royal Swedish Academy of Letters, History and Antiquities.
