= Christe =

Christe is a surname. Notable people with the surname include:

- Ian Christe (born 1970), Swiss author and disk jockey
- Karl O. Christe (born 1936), German-American inorganic chemist
