= Blickling homilies =

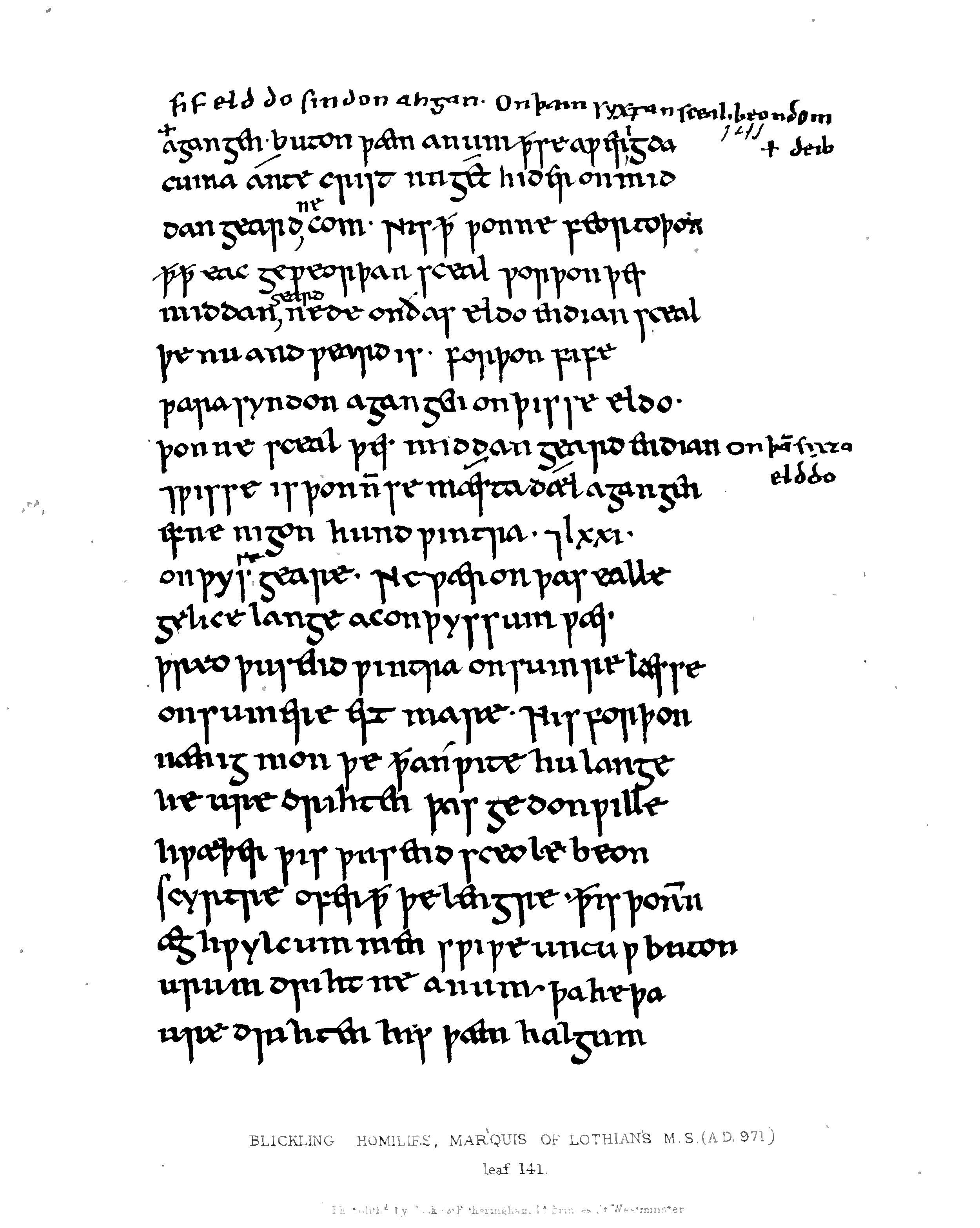
Photolithograph of Blickling Homilies (Princeton, Scheide Library, MS 71), leaf 141.

The Blickling homilies are a collection of anonymous homilies from Anglo-Saxon England. They are written in Old English, and were written down at some point before the end of the tenth century, making them one of the oldest collections of sermons to survive from medieval England, the other main witness being the Vercelli Book in Italy. Their name derives from Blickling Hall in Norfolk, which once housed them; the manuscript is now at Princeton, Scheide Library, MS 71.

== The Homilies ==
The homilies in the collection deal primarily with Lent, with items for Passion Sunday, Palm Sunday and Holy Week, as well as homilies dealing with Rogation Days, Ascension Day and Pentecost. The rest of the homilies in the collection are saints’ feast days.

As numbered in the first edition of the homilies, by Richard Morris, the contents are:

1. Incarnation of the Lord (In Natali Domini)
2. Quinquagesima/Shrove Sunday (Dominica Prima in Quinquagesima)
3. The First Sunday in Lent (Dominica Prima in Quadragesima)
4. The Third Sunday in Lent (Dominica Tertia in Quadragesima)
5. The Fifth Sunday in Lent (Dominica V in Quadragesima)
6. Palm Sunday (Dominica VI in Quadragesima)
7. Easter Day (Dominica Pascha)
8. Rogation Monday (To Þam Forman Gangdæge), called "Soul's Need" by Morris
9. Rogation Tuesday (To Þam Oþerum Gangdæge), called "Christ the Golden-Blossom" by Morris
10. Rogation Wednesday (To Þam Þriddan Gangdæge), called "The End of This World is Near" by Morris
11. Ascension Thursday (On Þa Halgan Þunres Dei)
12. Pentecost Sunday (Pentecostent - Spiritus Domini)
13. Assumption of the Virgin Mary (Sancta Maria Mater Domini Nostri Iesu Cristi)
14. The Birth of John the Baptist (Sancte Iohannes Baptista Spel)
15. The Story of SS Peter and Paul (Spel Be Petrus ond Paulus). Compare Passio sanctorum Petri et Pauli.
16. A Fragment
17. The Feast of St Michael the Archangel (To Sancte Michaheles Mæssan), called "Dedication of St Michael's Church" by Morris
18. The Feast of St Martin (To Sancte Martines Mæssan)
19. St Andrew (S. Andreas); lacks beginning and ending.

== Origin and audience of the collection ==
Little is known about the origin of the homilies or their intended audience. In the assessment of D. G. Scragg, the manuscript

is in origin a collection, put together, perhaps over a period of time, from a number of sources ... the scribes took care to put together a book which followed a preconceived design, following the chronology of the church year, and they perhaps took individual items from different sources, rather than blocks of items.

There is little overlap with the homilies of the Vercelli Book, from south-eastern England, suggesting that the Blickling Homilies were gathered in a different regional and intellectual milieu; the language of the Homilies suggests a Mercian origin. The collection does have some overlaps with another homily collection, MS Cambridge, Corpus Christi College 198, whose origins are also poorly understood, but which are likely to have been in the West Midlands.

Meanwhile, although it is surely significant that the homilies were in Old English rather than Latin, 'little sense of a specific congregation or reading audience prevails in this collection of ancient and commonplace materials for the instruction of Christian folk', and the intended audience of the material is essentially unknown.

== Blickling Homily XVI ==
The most famous and extensively studied of the Blickling Homilies is XVI (XVII in the numbering of Morris's edition), 'To Sanctae Michaeles Mæssan' ('On St Michael's Mass', generally celebrated on September 29 in tenth- to eleventh-century Anglo-Saxon England). The homily is not noted for being well composed, but for its relationship with Anglo-Saxon pilgrimage to Italy on the one hand, and some striking similarities with the Old English poem Beowulf on the other.

The homily is a translation of a version of a Latin hagiographical text known as 'De apparitione Sancti Michaelis' (Bibliotheca Hagiographica Latina 5948). This story provides a foundation myth for the Sanctuary of Monte Sant'Angelo, in Apulia, southeast Italy, the oldest Western European church dedicated to St Michael and a major pilgrimage site in the Middle Ages. Our earliest manuscripts of 'De apparitione' are of the early ninth century, and so this version was probably composed in the eighth century. The text tells of three different 'apparitions' by St Michael, which 'appear to have nothing in common and suggest at least three layers of narrative accretion'; the oldest strata of the text seem to go back to an earlier, lost version of perhaps the sixth century. Having come to Italy from the Near East, the cult of Michael spread to Frankia, where peregrinating Irish monks learned of it; the cult became popular in Ireland, from where the cult had spread to Anglo-Saxon England already by the seventh century. It is also clear that a number of Anglo-Saxon pilgrims passed through Monte Gargano: among the many pilgrims who inscribed their names on the cave walls, five bore Anglo-Saxon names, some inscribing in runes. Their date is uncertain but must be between c. 700 and c. 850. In the assessment of North, Allard, and Gillies, 'this aspect of history transforms the genre of this work [Blickling Homily XVI] ... from ... homily to tourist brochure'. Blickling Homily XVI seems to have a common source with Ælfric of Eynsham's later homily for September 29, which was clearly a Latin or vernacular version of the 'De apparitione'.

The most striking difference between Blickling Homily XVI and the Latin text of which it is a translation is that Blickling Homily XVI ends with a description of Hell, derived ultimately from the Visio sancti Pauli; the closest parallels are with a ninth-century, Latin version of the Visio known as Redaction XI, of Insular and probably Irish origin. The Blickling Homily XVI description of Hell is recognised as a close parallel to the description of Grendel's home in Beowulf (lines 2719-33). The homily may have influenced the poem directly, or both texts may have drawn on common sources; the main recent study of the connection is Charles D. Wright's, which argues for independent descent from a common source.

== Bibliography ==
The Blickling homilies were first edited and translated in the nineteenth century by Richard Morris, and were republished again in a more recent volume by Richard J. Kelly, although several scholars have since pointed to the many serious deficiencies with the latter. Samantha Zacher has indicated that a new edition is underway at the University of Toronto. There is also a new translation in progress at Rutgers University, where as of St. Valentine's Day 2021 the first five homilies are available and Aaron Hostetter calls for translations.

=== Editions and translations ===
- Morris, R. (ed. and tr.), The Blickling Homilies of the Tenth Century. Early English Text Society, o.s. 58, 63, and 73 (Oxford University Press: London, 1874–80; reprinted as one volume in 1880, 1967, and 2000) Also available from Google Books.
- Willard, Rudolph (ed.), The Blickling Homilies: The John H. Scheide Library, Titusville, Pennsylvania, Early English Manuscripts in Facsimile 10 (Rosenkilde and Bagger: Copenhagen, 1960) [Facsimile edition]
- Kelly, Richard J. (ed. and tr.), The Blickling Homilies, 2 vols. (Continuum: London and New York: 2003-9)
- Getz, Robert (ed. and tr.), The Blickling Homilies, Dumbarton Oaks Medieval Library 94 (Harvard University Press: Cambridge, MA, 2026)

=== Secondary literature ===
- Gatch, Milton McC., "The unknowable audience of the Blickling Homilies", Anglo-Saxon England 18 (1989), 99-115
- Jeffrey, J. Elizabeth. Blickling Spirituality and the Old English Vernacular Homily: A Textual Analysis (Mellen: Lewiston, 1989)
- Lapidge, Michael (ed.), The Blackwell Encyclopedia of Anglo-Saxon England (Blackwell: Oxford, 1999), pp. 241–2
- Scragg, D.G., "The homilies of the Blickling Manuscript" in Learning and Literature in Anglo-Saxon England, ed. Michael Lapidge and Helmut Gneuss (Cambridge University Press: Cambridge, 1985), pp. 299–316
