= Old English Bible translations =

The Bible was partially translated into the Old English language in medieval England. The translations are from Latin texts, not the original languages.

Many of these translations were in fact Bible glosses, prepared to assist clerics whose grasp of Latin was imperfect and circulated in connection with the Vulgate Latin Bible that was standard in Western Christianity at the time. Old English was one of very few early medieval vernacular languages the Bible was translated into, in the European West, and featured a number of incomplete Bible translations, some of which were meant to be circulated, like the Paris Psalter or Ælfric's Hexateuch.

== Early history (600-874) ==
Information about translations is limited before the Synod of Whitby in 664. Aldhelm, Bishop of Sherborne and Abbot of Malmesbury (639–709), is said to have written an Old English translation of the Psalms, although this is disputed.

Cædmon (~657–684) is mentioned by Bede as one who sang poems in Old English based on the Bible stories, but he was not involved in translation per se.

Bede (c. 672–735) produced a translation of the Gospel of John into Old English, which he is said to have prepared shortly before his death. This translation is lost; we know of its existence from Cuthbert of Jarrow's account of Bede's death.

The Vespasian Psalter (~850–875) is an interlinear gloss of the Book of Psalms in the Mercian dialect. Eleven other Anglo-Saxon (and two later) psalters with Old English glosses are known. The earliest are probably the early-9th-century red glosses of the Blickling Psalter (Morgan Library & Museum, M.776). The latest Old English gloss is contained in the 12th-century Eadwine Psalter. The Old English material in the Tiberius Psalter of around 1050 includes a continuous interlinear gloss of the psalms.

== Alfred and the House of Wessex (875-999) ==
As England was consolidated under the House of Wessex, led by descendants of Alfred the Great and Edward the Elder, translations continued. King Alfred (849–899) circulated a number of passages of the Bible in the vernacular. These included passages from the Ten Commandments and the Pentateuch, which he prefixed to a code of laws he promulgated around this time. Alfred is also said to have directed the Book of Psalms to have been translated into Old English, though scholars are divided on Alfredian authorship of the Paris Psalter collection of the first fifty Psalms.

In approximately 990, a full and freestanding version of the four Gospels in idiomatic Old English appeared in the West Saxon dialect and are known as the Wessex Gospels. Seven manuscript copies of this translation have survived. This translation gives us the most familiar Old English version of Matthew 6:9–13, the Lord's Prayer:

Fæder ure þu þe eart on heofonum, si þin nama gehalgod. To becume þin rice, gewurþe ðin willa, on eorðan swa swa on heofonum. Urne gedæghwamlican hlaf syle us todæg, and forgyf us ure gyltas, swa swa we forgyfað urum gyltendum. And ne gelæd þu us on costnunge, ac alys us of yfele. Soþlice.

== Gospels from the South, East and North ==
Between 950 and 970, Aldred the Scribe added a gloss in the Northumbrian dialect of Old English (the Northumbrian Gloss on the Gospels) to the Cassiodorian-Vulgate Latin Lindisfarne Gospels as well as a foreword describing who wrote and decorated it. Its version of The Lord's Prayer is as follows:

Suae ðonne iuih gie bidde fader urer ðu arð ðu bist in heofnum & in heofnas; sie gehalgad noma ðin; to-cymeð ric ðin. sie willo ðin suae is in heofne & in eorðo. hlaf userne oferwistlic sel us to dæg. & forgef us scylda usra suae uoe forgefon scyldgum usum. & ne inlæd usih in costunge ah gefrig usich from yfle

At around the same time (~950–970), the Northumbian glosses were transferred to the Irish-Vulgate Latin Rushworth Gospels, except a priest named Farman wrote a Wessex or Mercian gloss for the Gospel of Matthew and some of John.

At about the same time as the Wessex Gospels (~990), the priest Ælfric of Eynsham produced an independent translation of the Pentateuch with books of Joshua and Judges. His translations were used for the illustrated Old English Hexateuch.

Seemingly unrelated to Ælfric's translation are two versions of the Gospels:

- The three related manuscripts, Royal 1 A. xiv at the British Library, Bodley 441 and Hatton 38 at the Bodleian Library, are written in Old English, with a least one manuscript being produced in the late 12th century. Hatton 38 is noted as being written in the latest Kentish form of West Saxon. They cover the four Gospels, with one section (Luke 16.14–17.1) missing from both manuscripts, Hatton and Royal.
- Three other manuscripts and five fragments also contain text of Old English Gospels, not necessarily the same recension, from the late 900s.

== Late Anglo-Saxon translations (after 1000) ==
The Junius manuscript (initially ascribed to Cædmon) was copied about 1000. It includes Biblical material in vernacular verses: Genesis in two versions (Genesis A and Genesis B), Exodus, Daniel, and Christ and Satan, from the apocryphal Gospel of Nicodemus.

In 1066, the Norman Conquest marked the beginning of the end of the Old English language. Translating the Bible into Old English gradually ended with the movement from Old English to Middle English, and eventually there were attempts to provide Middle English Bible translations.

== Sources ==
- Colgrave, B., ed. (1958), The Paris Psalter: MS. Bibliothèque nationale fonds latin 8824, Early English Manuscripts in Facsimile, vol. 8, Copenhagen: Rosenkilde and Bagger, OCLC 717585.
- Dekker, Kees (2008), "Reading the Anglo-Saxon Gospels in the Sixteenth and Seventeenth Centuries", in Hall, Thoman N.; Scragg, Donald (eds.), Anglo-Saxon Books and Their Readers, Kalamazoo, MI, pp. 68–93, ISBN 978-1580441377.
- Dobbie, E. Van Kirk (1937), The Manuscripts of Caedmon's Hymn and Bede's Death Song with a Critical Text of the Epistola Cuthberti de obitu Bedae, New York: Columbia University Press, OCLC 188505.
- Gretsch, Mechthild (2000), "The Junius Psalter gloss: its historical and cultural context", Anglo-Saxon England, 29: 85–121, doi:10.1017/S0263675100002428, S2CID 162799591.
- Harsley, F, ed. (1889), Eadwine's Canterbury Psalter, Early English Text Society, vol. 92, London: Early English Text Society, OCLC 360348.
- Kato, Takako (2013), "Oxford, Bodley, Hatton 38: Gospels", in Da Rold, Orietta; Kato, Takako; Swan, Mary; Treharne, Elaine (eds.), The Production and Use of English Manuscripts 1060 to 1220, ISBN 978-0953231959.
- McGowan, Joseph P. (2007), "On the 'Red' Blickling Psalter Glosses", Notes and Queries, 54 (3): 205–207, doi:10.1093/notesj/gjm132.
- "MSS. Hatton", Bodleian Library Catalog, University of Oxford, 8 July 2011, archived from the original on 27 January 2013
- Roberts, Jane (2011), "Some Psalter Glosses in Their Immediate Context", in Silec, Tatjana; Chai-Elsholz, Raeleen; Carruthers, Leo (eds.), Palimpsests and the Literary Imagination of Medieval England: Collected Essays, Springer, pp. 61–79, ISBN 9780230100268.
- Stanton, Robert (2002), The Culture of Translation in Anglo-Saxon England, Cambridge: D.S. Brewer, ISBN 9780859916431.
- Stevenson, Joseph; Waring, George, eds. (1854–1865), The Lindisfarne and Rushworth Gospels, vol. 28, 39, 43, 48, Durham: Surtees Society.
- Treschow, Michael; Gill, Paramjit; Swartz, Tim B. (2012), "King Alfred's Scholarly Writings and the Authorship of the First Fifty Prose Psalms", The Heroic Age, 12
- Wright, David H., ed. (1967), The Vespasian Psalter, Early English Manuscripts in Facsimile, vol. 14, Copenhagen: Rosenkilde and Bagger, OCLC 5009657.
