= Cambridge, Corpus Christi College, MS 178 =

Library of Combridge

Cambridge, Corpus Christi College, MS 178 (CCCC 178) is an English manuscript in the library of Corpus Christi College, Cambridge. The codex consists of two parts that may have been together since the thirteenth century. The first part, pp. 1–270 (item 54 on Gneuss's Handlist), contains homilies for general occasions (1-163) and for festivals (164-270) and was compiled in the early eleventh century and derived from Worcester. The second part, pp. 287–457 (Gneuss 55), contains Latin and Old English versions of the Rule of Saint Benedict. Both parts were glossed by The Tremulous Hand of Worcester.

The first part formerly contained a number of homilies and other texts by Ælfric, including the Interrogationes Sigewulfi, his adaptation of Alcuin's Quaestiones in Genesim, which contains almost three hundred questions and answers on the Book of Genesis. This section was lifted from the manuscript by Matthew Parker and is now part of CCCC 162.

== Contents ==
=== 1-163 ===
- Ælfric's Catholic Homilies (CH) I.1, pp. 1–15
- Hexameron, pp. 15–30
- Interrogationes Sigewulfi (now in CCCC 162)
- CH I.24, pp. 33–43
- CH I.19, pp. 43–54
- Pope XI, pp. 54–73
- De octo uitiis et de duodecim abusiuis, pp. 73–88
- Ælfric's Lives of the Saints XVII.1-267, 88-101
- Sermo de die iudicii (Pope XVIII), pp. 101–114
- De falsis diis (Pope XXI.1-313), ppp. 142–63

== See also ==
- Cambridge University Library, Ff. i.27
