= Trembling hand =

Trembling hand or hands may refer to:

== Economics ==
- Trembling hand perfect equilibrium, a concept in game theory

== Music ==
- "Trembling Hands", a 2012 song by The Temper Trap

== People ==
- The Tremulous Hand of Worcester, a medieval scribe
