= Demetrianus =

Pupil of Lactantius

Demetrianus was a former pupil of Lactantius, but little is known about him. It was to him that Lactantius, a convert to Christianity, addressed his book On the Workmanship of God (De Opificio Dei), probably written in Bithynia around 304 C.E. In Divine Institutes 2.10.15, Lactantius also mentioned having written for Demetrianus about God’s workmanship.

Lactantius urged him not to allow wealth to lead him away from virtue (On the Workmanship of God 1). In addition Jerome wrote of Lactantius, “we have his…two books of letters to Demetrianus” (Concerning Illustrious Men, 80). (Only a few words of these letters survive, preserved by Jerome.) Demetrianus seems to have had an official job (On the Workmanship of God 1.4), and its description seems to contain another reference to Christianity. In 1.9 of the same book, Lactantius reminded Demetrianus where his real allegiance lay. The evidence clearly points to Demetrianus having been a Christian.
