= The Divine Institutes =

Theological work by Lactantius

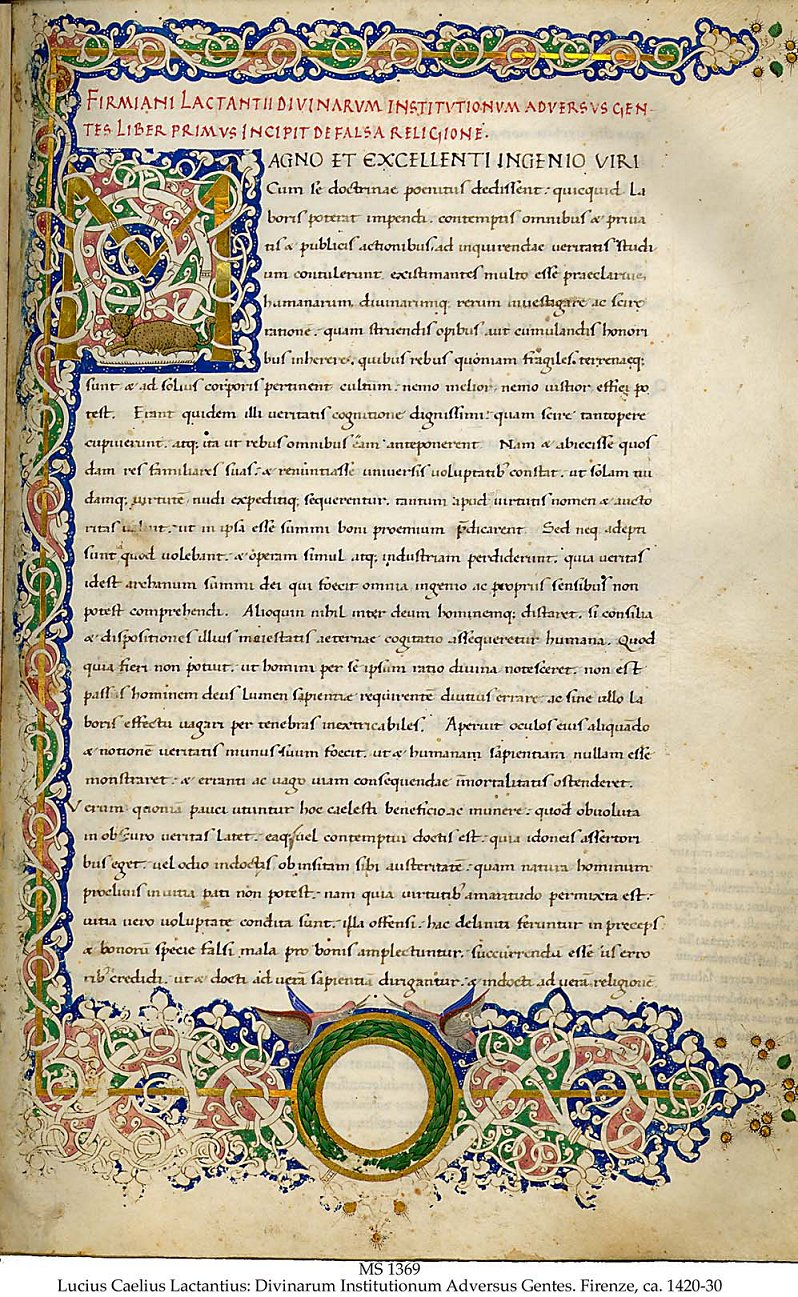
Beginning of Lactantius’ Divinae institutiones in a Renaissance manuscript written in Florence ca. 1420–30 by Guglielmino Tanaglia

Institutiones Divinae (Classical Latin: [ĩːstɪtuːtiˈoːneːs diːˈwiːnae̯], Ecclesiastical Latin: [institutsiˈones diˈvine]; The Divine Institutes) is the name of a theological work by the Christian Roman philosopher Lactantius, written between AD 303 and 311.

== Contents ==
Arguably the most important of Lactantius's works, the Divinae institutiones—the title of which was meant to correspond to the institutiones that expressed the workings of civil law—is both a systematic as well as apologetic work that, as Patrick Healy argues, "point out the futility of pagan beliefs and to establish the reasonableness and truth of Christianity." The work was the first full attempt to defend Christian theology in Latin, and it was likely written to appeal to and convince educated pagans. While Lactantius focused much of Divinae institutiones on combating the claims of pagan writers (who at the time were aiding the persecutors of Christianity by writing specialized attack pamphlets), the author also sought to make his work "sufficiently broad" so that it might stem criticisms from all directions.

=== Sources ===
Book VII of the work indicates a familiarity with Jewish, Christian, Egyptian and Iranian apocalyptic material, and alludes to the (now-lost) Oracle of Hystaspes. The work also makes use of Sibylline sources as well as the Hermetica of Hermes Trismegistus. Included in this treatise is also a quote from the nineteenth of the Odes of Solomon, one of only two known texts of the Odes until the early twentieth century.

== Reception ==
Patrick Healy notes, "The strengths and the weakness of Lactantius are nowhere better shown than in his work. The beauty of the style, the choice and aptness of the terminology, cannot hide the author's lack of grasp on Christian principles and his almost utter ignorance of Scripture." Lactantius's mockery of the idea of a round Earth was criticized by Copernicus in the preface to his book De revolutionibus orbium coelestium, in which the author writes, "Lactantius, the writer celebrated in other ways but very little in mathematics, spoke somewhat childishly of the shape of the Earth when he derided those who declared the Earth had the shape of a ball" (Lactantium, celebrem alioqui scriptorem, sed Mathematicum parum, admodum pueriliter de forma terræ loqui, cum deridet eos, qui terram globi formam habere prodiderunt).

According to the World Digital Library, Divinae institutiones was one of the first books to be printed in Italy, as well as the first Italian imprint to be dated.

== Editions ==
- Lactantius (1964). The Divine Institutes: Books I–VII. Translated by Mary Francis McDonald. Washington, D.C.: Catholic University of America Press. pp. 15–544.
- Lactantius (1973–). Institutions divines. Introduction, texte critique, traduction et notes [Divine institutes. Introduction, critical text, translation and notes] (Sources Chrétiennes). 6 volumes (as of 2025). Paris: Éd. du CERF.
- Lactantius (2003). Divine institutes. Translated with an introduction and notes by Anthony Bowen and Peter Garnsey (Translated texts for historians, vol. 40). Liverpool: University Press, ISBN 0-85323-988-6.
- Lactantius (2005–2011). Divinarum institutionum libri septem. Ed. by Eberhard Heck and Antonie Wlosok (Bibliotheca Teubneriana). 4 volumes. Munich/Leipzig (volume 1) and Berlin (volumes 2–4): K. G. Saur (volume 1) and De Gruyter (volumes 2–4).
- Lactantius (2025). Divinae institutiones. Einleitung, Text, Übersetzung und Anmerkungen [Divinae institutiones. Introduction, text, translation and notes]. Ed. by Stefan Freund, Wolfram Schröttel and Wolfram Winger (Litterae Christianorum, vol. 1). 2 volumes. Stuttgart: Steiner, ISBN 978-3-515-13253-4 (Open Access).

== Bibliography ==
- Charlesworth, James Hamilton (1973). The Odes of Solomon. Oxford, UK: Oxford University Press. ISBN 9780891302025.
- Editors of Encyclopædia Britannica (April 22, 2009). "Lucretius". Encyclopædia Britannica.
- Healy, Patrick (2012) [1910]. "Lucius Caecilius Firmianus Lactantius". The Catholic Encyclopedia. Vol. 8. New York City, NY: Robert Appleton Company.
- Guimont, Edward (2026). The Power of the Flat Earth Idea: History from the Marginalised. Palgrave Macmillan. ISBN 978-3-032-23980-8.
- McDonald, Mary Francis (1964a). "General Introduction". The Divine Institutes: Books I–VII. Washington, D.C.: Catholic University of America Press. pp. ixx–xv. ISBN 9780813211497.
- McDonald, Mary Francis (1964b). "Introduction". The Divine Institutes: Books I–VII. Washington, D.C.: Catholic University of America Press. pp. 3–14. ISBN 9780813211497.
- McGinn, Bernard (1998). Visions of the End. New York City, NY: Columbia University Press. ISBN 9780231112574.
- Stimson, Dorothy (2009) [1917]. The Gradual Acceptance of the Copernican Theory of the Universe. Whitefish, MT: Kessinger Publishing. ISBN 9781104423483.
