= Paris Psalter (Anglo-Saxon) =

End of Psalm 20 and start of Psalm 21

The Paris Psalter (Paris, Bibliothèque Nationale, MS. Fonds Latin 8824) is an entire Anglo-Saxon psalm book written in both Latin and the West Saxon dialect of Old English. The manuscript dates from the middle of 11th century, written by a scribe who stated that he was called Wulfwinus cognomento Cada (i.e. Wulfwine or Wulfwig surnamed Cada in Old English). The first 50 psalms are written in prose, while the Old English psalms from 51 to 150 are written in the metrical form. The first 50 psalms have been credibly attributed to Alfred the Great.

Its illustrations are in the Utrecht Psalter style, and some may have been filler when the Latin was shorter than the English. It had an estimated 200 leaves in 25 quires, but 14 leaves (including those with major decoration) were removed.

The Latin is written in Anglo-Caroline minuscle.

== Editions (Poetry) ==
- Krapp, George Philip (1932). The Paris Psalter and the Meters of Boethius. New York: Columbia University Press. ISBN 0-231-08769-1.
- Foys, Martin (2019). Old English Poetry in Facsimile Project. Madison, WI: University of Wisconsin-Madison.
