= De ave phoenice =

Poem attributed to Lactantius

De ave phoenice is a poem attributed to the early Christian apologist writer Lactantius. The poem is not overtly Christian; scholars point to certain aspects of the text to support their view that the author intended a Christian interpretation of the phoenix. They interpret the mythological phoenix motif as symbolic of Christ and resurrection.

== Authorship ==
Some theologians have speculated that the poem may have been written in a later period such as the Renaissance. Others believe that Lactantius may have written the poem before his conversion to Christianity. The majority of scholars accept that Lactantius was the author. This view is supported by several medieval writers and early manuscripts. Gregory of Tours wrote in De cursu stellarum of the wonders of the world one of which "quod de Phinice Lactantius refert".

== Poem ==
There is an Old English poem, The Phoenix, based to some extent on Lactantius' work. Both poems open with a description of the Eastern garden (paradise) as the home of the phoenix:

Est locus in primo felix oriente remotus

Qua patet aeterni maxima porta poli,

Nec tamen aestivos hiemisve propinquus ad ortus

Sed qua Sol uerno fundit ab axe diem

Translation:

There lies a place far off, on the eastern edge of the world,

A blessed place, where the great portal of the eternal skies stands open:

The place does not lie close to the sun's rising in summer or winter

But close to the point where it pours light from its chariot in spring

—In English translation
