= Lactantius =

Roman Christian author (c. 250 – c. 325)

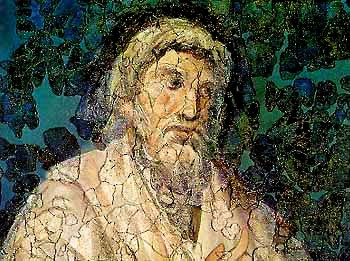
- Fourth-century mural possibly depicting Lactantius (or possibly Apuleius)
- Born: Lucius Caecilius Firmianus Lactantius c. 250 AD; Cirta, Numidia (present-day Constantine, Algeria)
- Died: c. 325 AD (aged c. 75); Augusta Treverorum, Gallia Belgica (present-day Trier, Germany)
- Citizenship: Roman
- Writing career
- Notable work: Institutiones Divinae

Lucius Caecilius Firmianus Lactantius (c. 250 AD – c. 325 AD) was an early Christian author who became an advisor to Roman emperor Constantine I, guiding his Christian religious policy in its initial stages of emergence, and a tutor to his son Crispus. His most important work is the Institutiones Divinae ("The Divine Institutes"), an apologetic treatise intended to establish the reasonableness and truth of Christianity to pagan critics.

He is best known for his apologetic works, widely read during the Renaissance by humanists, who called Lactantius the "Christian Cicero". Also often attributed to Lactantius is the poem The Phoenix, which is based on the myth of the phoenix from Egypt and Arabia. Though the poem is not clearly Christian in its motifs, modern scholars have found some literary evidence in the text to suggest the author had a Christian interpretation of the eastern myth as a symbol of resurrection.

== Biography ==
Lactantius was of Berber origin, born into a family that had not converted to Christianity. He was a pupil of Arnobius who taught at Sicca Veneria, an important city in Numidia (corresponding to today's city of El Kef in Tunisia). In his early life, he taught rhetoric in his native town, which may have been Cirta in Numidia, where an inscription mentions a certain "L. Caecilius Firmianus".

Lactantius had a successful public career at first. At the request of the Roman emperor Diocletian, he became an official professor of rhetoric in Nicomedia; the voyage from Africa is described in his poem Hodoeporicum (now lost). There, he associated in the imperial circle with the administrator and polemicist Sossianus Hierocles and the Neoplatonic philosopher Porphyry; he first met Constantine, and Galerius, whom he cast as villain in the persecutions. Having converted to Christianity, he resigned his post before Diocletian's purging of Christians from his immediate staff and before the publication of Diocletian's first "Edict against the Christians" (February 24, 303).

As a Latin rhetor in a Greek city, he subsequently lived in poverty according to Saint Jerome and eked out a living by writing until Constantine I became his patron. The persecution forced him to leave Nicomedia, perhaps re-locating to North Africa. The emperor Constantine appointed the elderly Lactantius Latin tutor to his son Crispus in 309–310 who was probably 10–15 years old at the time. Lactantius followed Crispus to Trier in 317, when Crispus was made Caesar (subordinate co-emperor) and sent to the city. Crispus was put to death by order of his father Constantine I in 326. The time and circumstances of Lactantius's death are unknown.

== Works ==
Like many of the early Christian authors, Lactantius depended on classical models. Saint Jerome praised his writing style while faulting his ability as a Christian apologist, saying: "Lactantius has a flow of eloquence worthy of Tully: would that he had been as ready to teach our doctrines as to pull down those of others!" Similarly, the early humanists called him the "Christian Cicero" (Cicero Christianus). A translator of the Divine Institutes wrote: "Lactantius has always held a very high place among the Christian Fathers, not only on account of the subject-matter of his writings, but also on account of the varied erudition, the sweetness of expression, and the grace and elegance of style, by which they are characterized."

=== Prophetic exegesis ===
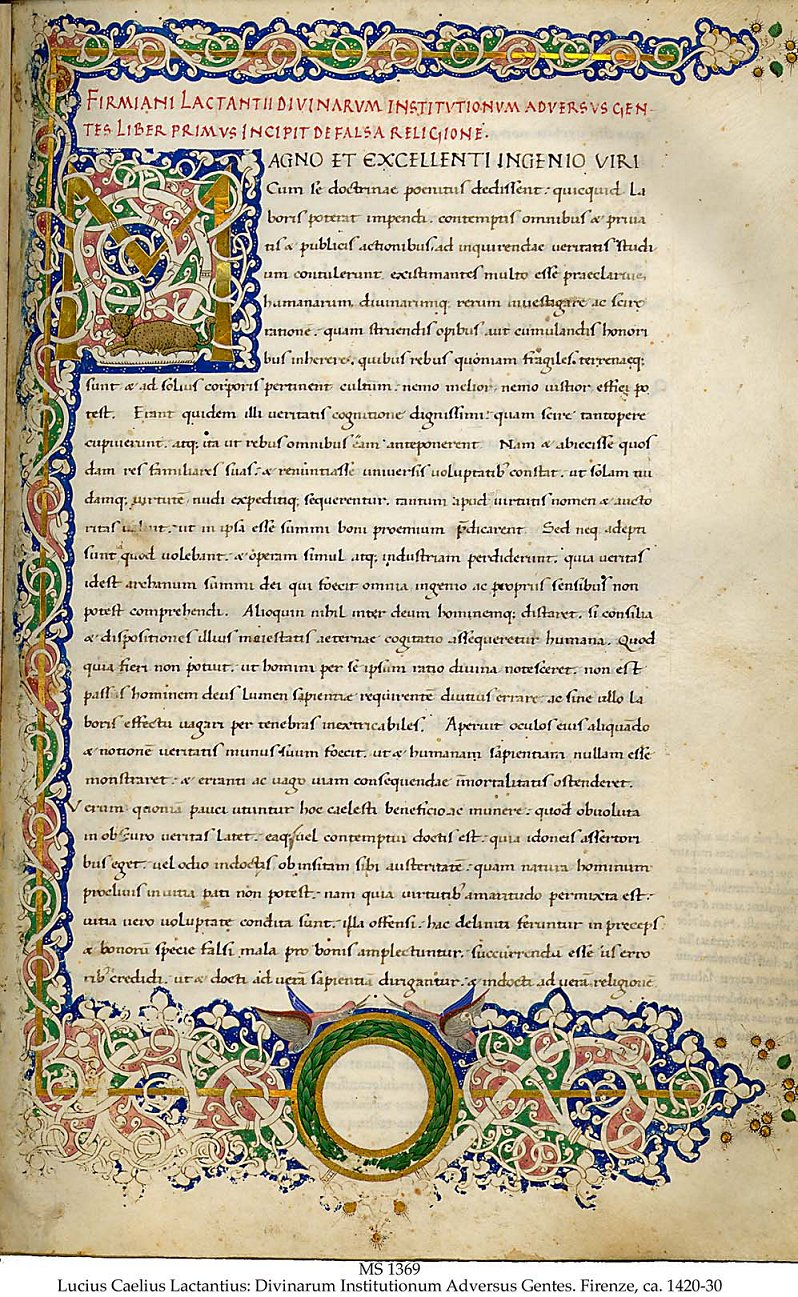
Beginning of Lactantius' Divinae institutiones in a Renaissance manuscript written in Florence ca. 1420–1430 by Guglielmino Tanaglia

Like many writers in the first few centuries of the early church, Lactantius took a premillennialist view, holding that the second coming of Christ will precede a millennium or a thousand-year reign of Christ on earth. According to Charles E. Hill, "With Lactantius in the early fourth century we see a determined attempt to revive a more 'genuine' form of chiliasm." Lactantius quoted the Sibyls extensively (although the Sibylline Oracles are now considered to be pseudepigrapha). Book VII of The Divine Institutes indicates a familiarity with Jewish, Christian, Egyptian and Iranian apocalyptic material.

Attempts to determine the time of the End were viewed as in contradiction to Acts 1:7: "It is not for you to know the times or seasons that the Father has established by his own authority," and Mark 13:32: "But of that day or hour, no one knows, neither the angels in heaven, nor the Son, but only the Father."

=== Apologetics ===
He wrote apologetic works explaining Christianity in terms that would be palatable to educated people who still practiced the traditional religions of the Empire. He defended Christian beliefs against the criticisms of Hellenistic philosophers. His Divinae Institutiones ("Divine Institutes") were an early example of a systematic presentation of Christian thought.

- De Opificio Dei ("On the Workmanship of God"), an apologetic work, written in 303 or 304 during Diocletian's persecution and dedicated to a former pupil, a rich Christian named Demetrianius. The apologetic principles underlying all the works of Lactantius are well set forth in this treatise.
- Institutiones Divinae ("The Divine Institutes"), written between 303 and 311. This is the most important of the writings of Lactantius. It was "one of the first books printed in Italy and the first dated Italian imprint." As an apologetic treatise, it was intended to point out the futility of pagan beliefs and to establish the reasonableness and truth of Christianity as a response to pagan critics. It was also the first attempt at a systematic exposition of Christian theology in Latin and was planned on a scale sufficiently broad to silence all opponents. Patrick Healy argues that "The strengths and the weakness of Lactantius are nowhere better shown than in his work. The beauty of the style, the choice and aptness of the terminology, cannot hide the author's lack of grasp on Christian principles and his almost utter ignorance of Scripture." Included in this treatise is a quote from the nineteenth of the Odes of Solomon, one of only two known texts of the Odes until the early twentieth century. However, his mockery of the idea of a round Earth was criticised by Copernicus as "childish".
- De mortibus persecutorum ("On the Deaths of the Persecutors") has an apologetic character but given Lactantius's presence at the court of Diocletian in Nicomedia and the court of Constantine in Gaul, it is considered a valuable primary source for the events it records. Lactantius describes the goal of the work as follows:
  "I relate all those things on the authority of well-informed persons, and I thought it proper to commit them to writing exactly as they happened, lest the memory of events so important should perish, and lest any future historian of the persecutors should corrupt the truth."
  The point of the work is to describe the deaths of the persecutors of Christians before Lactantius (Nero, Domitian, Decius, Valerian, Aurelian) as well as those who were the contemporaries of Lactantius himself: Diocletian, Maximian, Galerius, Maximinus and Maxentius. This work is taken as a chronicle of the last and greatest of the persecutions in spite of the moral point that each anecdote has been arranged to tell. Here, Lactantius preserves the story of Constantine's vision of the Chi Rho before his conversion to Christianity. The full text is found in only one manuscript, which bears the title Lucii Caecilii liber ad Donatum Confessorem de Mortibus Persecutorum.

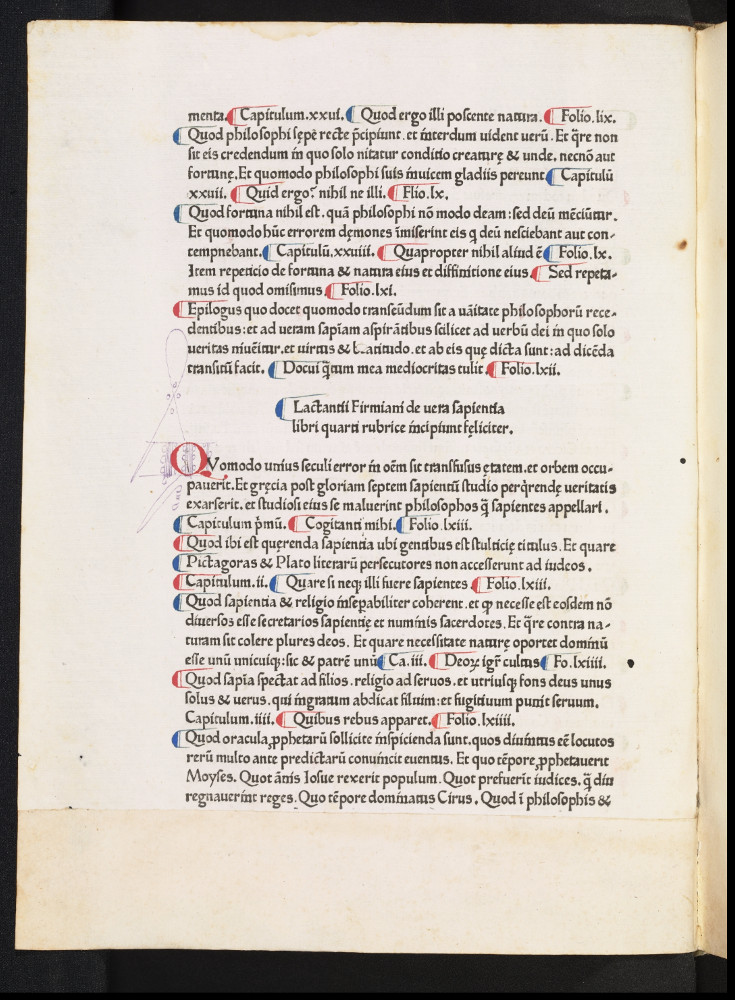
Page from the Opera, a manuscript from 1465, featuring various colours of pen-work

- An Epitome of the Divine institutes is a summary treatment of the subject.

=== Other works ===
- De ira Dei ("On the Wrath of God" or "On the Anger of God"), directed against the Stoics and Epicureans.
- Widely attributed to Lactantius although it shows only cryptic signs of Christianity, the poem The Phoenix (de Ave Phoenice) tells the story of the death and rebirth of that mythical bird. That poem in turn appears to have been the principal source for the famous Old English poem to which the modern title The Phoenix is given.

== Later heritage ==
For unclear reasons, he became considered somewhat heretical after his death. The Gelasian Decree of the 6th century condemns his work as apocryphal and not to be read. Renaissance humanists took a renewed interest in him, more for his elaborately rhetorical Latin style than for his theology. His works were copied in manuscript several times in the 15th century and were first printed in 1465 by the Germans Arnold Pannartz and Konrad Sweynheim at the Abbey of Subiaco. This edition was the first book printed in Italy to have a date of printing, as well as the first use of a Greek alphabet font anywhere, which was apparently produced in the course of printing, as the early pages leave Greek text blank. It was probably the fourth book ever printed in Italy. A copy of this edition was sold at auction in 2000 for more than $1 million.

== See also ==
- Problem of evil

== Sources ==
- Kerr, R.M. (2019). "Laktanz: Ein Laktosfreier Punier?". Manuscripta Orientalia (in German). 25: 3–8.
- Guimont, Edward (2026). The Power of the Flat Earth Idea: History from the Marginalised. Palgrave Macmillan. ISBN 978-3-032-23980-8.
