= Quaestiones in Genesim =

Commentary on Book of Genesis

Quaestiones in Genesim is a commentary on the biblical Book of Genesis by the Anglo-Saxon scholar Alcuin, addressed to his protege Sigewulf, comprising 281 questions and corresponding answers about Genesis. It has been dated by Michael Fox to around 796.

Surviving in at least 52 manuscripts, the text seems to have been among the most popular biblical commentaries of the Early Middle Ages, and was cited by Claudius of Turin, Hrabanus Maurus, Angelomus of Luxeuil, Haimo of Auxerre, and Remigius of Auxerre. Around two centuries after its original composition, it was translated into Old English by Ælfric of Eynsham as Interrogationes Sigewulfi.
