= The Phoenix (Old English poem) =

Anonymous Old English poem

The Phoenix is an anonymous Old English poem. It is composed of 677 lines and is for the most part a translation and adaptation of the Latin poem De Ave Phoenice attributed to Lactantius. It is found in the Exeter Book.

== Origins ==
The composition of The Phoenix dates from the ninth century. Although the text is complete, it has been edited and translated many times. It is a part of the Exeter Book contained within folios 55b-65b, and is a story based on three main sources: Carmen de ave phoenice by Lactantius (early fourth century), the Bible, and Hexaemeron by Ambrose. The first part of the poem is based solely on Lactantius' piece; the second part of the poem is based on scripture, mostly from Job, especially 29:18 (with references to the New Testament, Revelation, and Genesis), and Ambrose's piece. The story of the Phoenix resembles the resurrection of Christ. The first 380 lines paraphrase the Latin version De Carmen de ave phoenice with many of the pagan elements removed from the original Phoenix story. The last 297 lines are an allegorical application of Christianity, and applied to the story of the phoenix. Within the last eleven lines, the poem concludes by combining Old English and Latin. Some possibilities have been suggested, including a passage from the Hexaemeron of Saint Ambrose, and a commentary on the book of Job that had once been attributed to Bede, but has been determined “most certainly” to not have been authored by him. To put the piece in context, in terms of contemporary scholarship, Heffernan labels the time period in which The Phoenix was written, generally “homiletic,” which means the literature during that period was generally written in the style of a sermon. As mentioned previously, the authorship of The Phoenix is up for debate, but may have been the work of Cynewulf, as there are verbal and stylistic similarities between his literary works and The Phoenix.

== Plot ==
The beginning of The Phoenix describes the Garden of Eden as a Paradise, meant only for believers, in “eastern lands,” of sweet smells and means of extremes; the weather is mild: it never snows, rains, nor is the sun hot. There are no distinguishing geographical features whatsoever, like mountains, or valleys. However, the “plain,” as the poem refers to the Garden, is resplendent with blooming foliage that never dies. In this environment, there are no extreme emotions at all: no death, sickness, or misery, but on the flip side of that coin, readers get the sense that there are no extreme positive emotions either. Biblical events are occasionally referenced, including the flood, God's creation of the world, and the Judgment at the end of time. There is also a recurrence of certain numbers, particularly the numbers three and twelve, which are also recurrent in Biblical literature. It is not until line 85 that the actual Phoenix bird is introduced, as a resident of “that forest,” and it seems to be primarily employed in watching the eternalness of the Garden. Its other activities include bathing, nest-making, singing, ruling over its fellow fowl as a prince, and perpetually growing old, dying, and then undergoing rebirth from its ashes, a glorious fiery death, which symbolizes giving of the self; and finally the resurrection from the ashes, symbolizing eternal life.

The second part of the poem becomes allegorical, where the bird symbolizes Christ's death and resurrection, his ability to return and raise the dead, and take the living followers on flight to the beautiful home (Paradise) of the phoenix. The phoenix also symbolizes the faithful followers through the baptismal altar where the sinful self dies and the new hope within Christ comes to life. There may be, as well, two more possible symbols of the bird, as Carol Falvo Heffernan discusses, that the phoenix represents the Virgin Mary and the Catholic Church.

The lines below show the living followers – as symbolized phoenixes – on flight to the beautiful home of the phoenix (Paradise).

"Now Just so after death, through the lord's might, souls together with body will journey- handsomely adorned, just like the bird, with noble perfumes-into abundant joys where the sun, steadfastly true, glistens radiant above the multitudes in heavenly city.

Then the redeeming Christ, high above its roofs, will shine upon souls steadfast in truth. Him they will follow, these beautiful birds, radiantly regenerate, blissfully jubilant, spirits elect, into that happy home everlasting to eternity. There the fiend, outcast, importunate, cannot treacherously harm them by his evil, but there they shall live for ever clothed in light, gist as the phoenix bird, in the safe-keeping of the Lord, radiant in glory. Each one's achievement will brightly sparkle in that joyous home before the face of the everlasting Lord, perpetually at peace, like the sun. There a bright halo, marvelously braided with precious stones, will rise above the head of each of the blessed. Their heads will glisten, crowned with majesty. The rare and regal diadem of a prince will adorn with light each of the righteous in that existence where enduring joy, everlasting and fresh anew, never wanes; but rather they will dwell in beauty, surrounded with glory, with lovely adornments, together with the Father of the angels." (lines 583-604)

== Relationship to Old English Christianity ==
After the death of the Phoenix, it returns to life, which represents Christian doctrine of the resurrection. This is the central theme of the poem. Through examples taken from the natural world the author of the Phoenix is able to relate Christianity to the text. The phoenix desires to be born again.

Old English Christianity seems to have a generally fatalistic outlook on life. Themes of the inevitability of death and unhappy implications of the Final Judgment, for example, pervade other Old English poetry like Beowulf. Such does not seem to be the case with The Phoenix, which devotes passages to describing the beauty of its objects: the Garden of Eden and the Phoenix bird itself.

The Phoenix conceptualizes existence as a continuous cycle of birth, death, and rebirth, using the analogy of “the nature of corn,” or the harvest. In fact, Bugge considers this reading of The Phoenix, as a symbol Christian soteriology, or the doctrine of resurrection, almost too obvious. However, such an existence is perfected, it does not actually exist in reality, so perhaps the point of expounding on such perfection is to convey a sense of loss, of lamenting what was and can never be again, because of the actions of our own human folly. Thus, in this context, The Phoenix represents a sort of classic fatalist sense of Old English Christianity, but couched and hidden away in terms of the language of beautiful imagery and pleasant descriptions. However, such language really conveys, to readers, negative emotions, which then trigger the true fatalistic nature, the sense of loss, characteristic of Old English Christianity.

== Critical assessment ==
The subject mostly approached by scholars when giving critical assessment on The Phoenix is the absence of pagan names and details. J. E. Cross comments on O. F. Emerson's theory about the poet omitting many of the classical allusions to change the original phoenix myth into a Christian poem. Cross disagrees by saying, "The Old English poet cannot do other than omit the names in transferring the ideas to a different poetic idiom, especially such a clearly didactic poem, which assumes an audience less knowledgeable than the author".

In one incident, the poet stops short in using an offensive statement dealing with the rites of the Egyptian sun cult; although the basics are there. A careful reading by a person educated in mythology may detect many adapted myths.

Scholars also identify sexuality, or the lack thereof, as a central theme in "The Phoenix". Bugge states that “elite Christians, who choose a regimen of the strict sexual purity…[somewhat] emulate the apparent sexlessness of the Phoenix” as depicted in the poem.

== Editions and translation ==
- Foys, Martin et al. Old English Poetry in Facsimile Project. Center for the History of Print and Digital Culture. Madison, 2019-. Full digital facsimile edition and modern translation.
- Cook, Albert Stanburrough (ed.). The Old English Elene, Phoenix, and Physiologus. New Haven: Yale University Press, 1919.
- The king of birds: or, The lay of the phoenix (1844). An Anglo-Saxon song of the tenth or eleventh century, translated into the metre and alliteration of the original, and communicated to the Society of Antiquaries by English archeologist and philologist George Stephens.
- Blake, N F. The Phoenix. Manchester: Manchester U Press, 1964.

== Bibliography ==
- Blake, N F. The Phoenix. Manchester: Manchester U Press, 1964.
- Bugge, John. “The Virgin Phoenix,” Mediaeval Studies 38 (1976), 332-50.
- Calder, G. Daniel. "The vision of paradise: a symbolic reading of the Old English Phoenix." Anglo-Saxon England (1972): 167-81.
- Cross, J.E. "The Conception of the Old English Phoenix." In Old English Poetry: Fifteen Essays, ed. Robert P. Creed. Providence, Rhode Island: Brown Univ. Press, 1967. 129-52.
- Faraci, Dora. "Phoenix." The Blackwell Encyclopedia of Anglo-Saxon England. Ed. Michael Lapide. 1991. 284-301.
- Fulton, Edward. "On the Authorship of the Anglo-Saxon Poem Phoenix. Modern Language Notes. 11.3 (Mar 1896): 73-85.
- Heffernan, C F. "The Old English Phoenix: A Reconsideration." Neuphiologische Miteilungen 83 (1982): 239-54.
- Hood, Todd W. “Could Brego and Nergend be the Direct Objects of Beodan in Lines 497a-498b of the Old English Phoenix?” Matheliende. Vol. Vii, No.1. Athens: University of Georgia, 1999.
- Hood, Todd W. "Translating the Phoenix from Old English into Modern English Prose and Alliterative Verse." Auburn: Auburn University, 1994.
- Jones, Timothy. "The Phoenix." Medieval England: An Encyclopedia. Ed. Paul Szarmach, Teresa M Tavormina, Joel T. Rosenthal. New York: Garland, 1998. 596-7.
- Kennedy, Charles W. Early English Christian Poetry. New York: Oxford University Press, 1963.
- Medieval England: An Encyclopedia, ed. Paul E. Szarmach, M. Teresa Tavormina and Joel T. Rosenthal. New York: Garland Pub., 1998.
- Lecocq, Françoise, "L’oiseau Phénix de Lactance: uariatio et postérité (de Claudien au poème anglo-saxon médiéval The Phoenix", La uariatio: l’aventure d’un principe d’écriture, de l’Antiquité au XXIe siècle, ed. H. Vial, Paris, Classiques Garnier, 2014, 185-201.
- Encyclopedia of the Middle Ages, ed. Andre Vauchez; translated by Adrian Walford, Oxford: Oxford University Press, c 2001.
- "The Phoenix." The Anglo-Saxon Poetic Records: A Collective Edition. Ed. George Philip Krapp and Elliott Van Kirk Dobbie. 1st ed. Vol. 3. New York: Columbia UP, 1936. 94-113. Print. The Exeter Book.
