= Exodus (poem) =

10th-century Old English poem

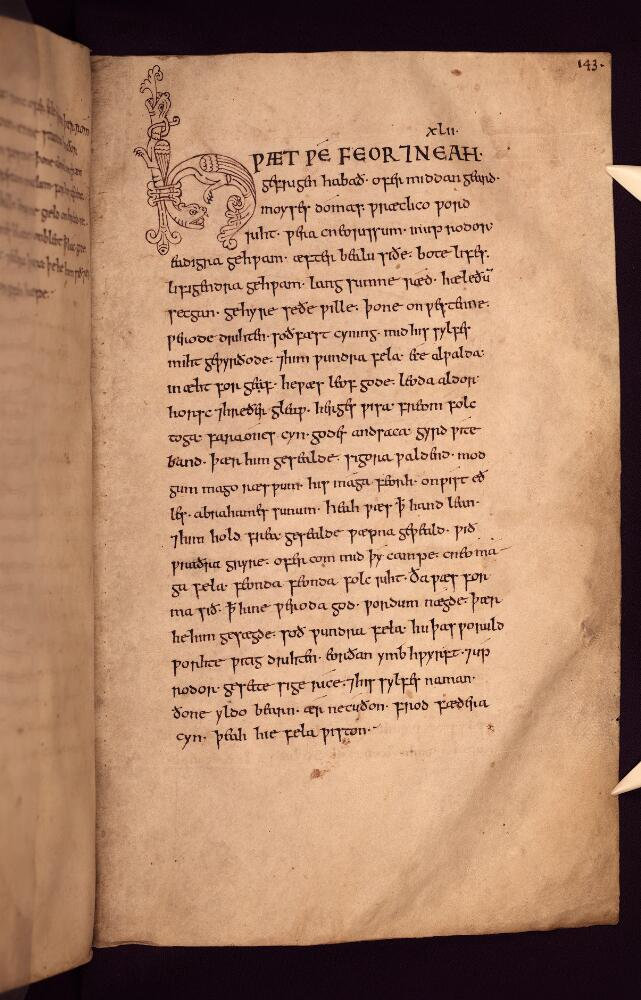
- The first page of Exodus in MS Junius 11.
- Author(s): Unknown
- Language: Old English
- Manuscript(s): Junius manuscript (Oxford, Bodleian Library, MS Junius 11)
- Genre: Heroic poetry
- Verse form: Alliterative
- Length: 590 lines
- Subject: Israelite's escape from Egypt
- Setting: Egypt/Red Sea
- Period covered: From the tenth Egyptian plague to the defeat of Pharaoh by the Red Sea
- Sources: Book of Exodus, Easter liturgy

Exodus is the title given to an Old English alliterative poem in the 10th century Junius manuscript (Oxford, Bodleian Library, MS Junius 11). Exodus is not a paraphrase of the biblical book, but rather a re-telling of the story of the Israelites' flight from Egyptian captivity and the Crossing of the Red Sea in the manner of a "heroic epic", much like Old English poems Andreas, Judith, or even Beowulf. It is one of the densest, most allusive and complex poems in Old English, and is the focus of much critical debate.

== Style and imagery ==
Exodus brings a traditional "heroic style" to its biblical subject-matter. Moses is treated as a general, and military imagery pervades the poem. The destruction of the Egyptians in the Red Sea is narrated in much the same way as a formulaic battle scene from other Old English poems, including a 'Beast of Battle' motif very common in the poetry. According to Malcolm Godden, the allusion to battle within the poem is a way to illustrate that God defends his chosen people.

The main story is suspended at one point to tell the stories of Noah and Abraham's sacrifice of Isaac. Some scholars consider this change of subject a feature of the "epic style" comparable with the similar digressions in Beowulf, while others have proposed it is a later interpolation. Edward B. Irving edited the poem twice, in 1955 and 1981: the first edition excerpted the Noah and Abraham portion as a separate poem; on later reflection, Irving recanted, admitting it was an integrated part of the Exodus poem. There appears to be justification in patristic sermons for connecting the crossing of the Red Sea with these topics.

== Allegory ==
In recent decades, attention has shifted away from the "heroic" aspects of Exodus to consider its densely allusive structure and possible typology. Peter J. Lucas, for instance, has argued that the poem is an allegorical treatment of the Christian fight with the devil. The Crossing of the Red Sea has been seen as echoing the baptismal liturgy and prefiguring the entrance into Heaven. The Pharaoh may be associated with Satan through some subtle verbal echoes.

The Egyptians are seen as being associated with the Devil because they are attempting to keep the Israelites from reaching God. In the poem, the Israelites are being led across the path through the Red Sea by a pillar of cloud which is described as a “segle” (sail). Maxwell Luria argues that the sail represents a symbolic sea-voyage. This sea-voyage then represents the Israelites weathering their storm with the help of God's protection. The Red Sea is seen as representing baptismal waters and the crossing of the Israelites as the first Christian salvation. However, J. E. Cross also argues that the poem is not simply symbolic for baptism, because the “Crossing” also occurs “as a brief illustration together with other examples of saving by water”. He argues that there are too many unrelated events in the poem for it to truly serve as a baptismal allegory. However, the journey of the Israelites in the poem may be taken as a metaphor for the life of man, since life can be “extended…as a pilgrim’s progress on land or as a voyage by sea”. It seems especially possible that this equation was intended when one looks back at the other symbols of stormy weather and salvation. Furthermore, the Egyptians are referred to as “landsmen” while the Israelites are called “sea-faring” and being led by God's “sail,” which gives strength to the idea that the Israelites are making their way toward salvation.

In the Old English version of the poem, Moses is said to have parted the sea with a “green” staff, a description which does not appear in the Latin script. According to Luria, the cross which Jesus was nailed to was also described as being “green,” and therefore he equates this with meaning that Moses was pious, while others, such as the Egyptians, represented “dry wood” or impious people.

Within the poem, allusions to both Noah and Abraham are made. Noah, who built an ark to survive the great flood, and Abraham, who was willing to sacrifice his son, Isaac, both represent a symbol of Christian salvation. Luria argues that like Moses, Noah also represents a type of Christ-like figure. Similarly, Isaac may represent a Christ-like figure, since he was a son who was to be sacrificed as well. The poem hinges on the emphasis that “faith is the key to salvation”. The faithful Israelites made it across the Red Sea, while the faithless Egyptians perished in the water. J.E. Cross describes how Aelfric, an Anglo-Saxon abbot, once gave a sermon over Exodus, in which he too describes the poem as being allegorical. Aelfric believed that Egypt represented the world, the Pharaoh represented the Devil, the Red Sea represented baptism, the Egyptians represented sins, and the pillar of cloud represented Christ.

== Similarities with other poems ==
There are similar metaphors and lines in other Old English literature, which shows that Exodus was influential to the Anglo-Saxons. The poem centers largely around the concept of water and the sea, and consequently contains many synonyms and metaphors for those concepts. Similar themes of a sea-voyage also occur in The Seafarer, Christ II, and The Wanderer. One particular line from Exodus also appears in The Seafarer: “atol yða gewealc” – “the horrible rolling waves”.
