= Daniel (Old English poem) =

Anonymous Old English poem based on the biblical Book of Daniel

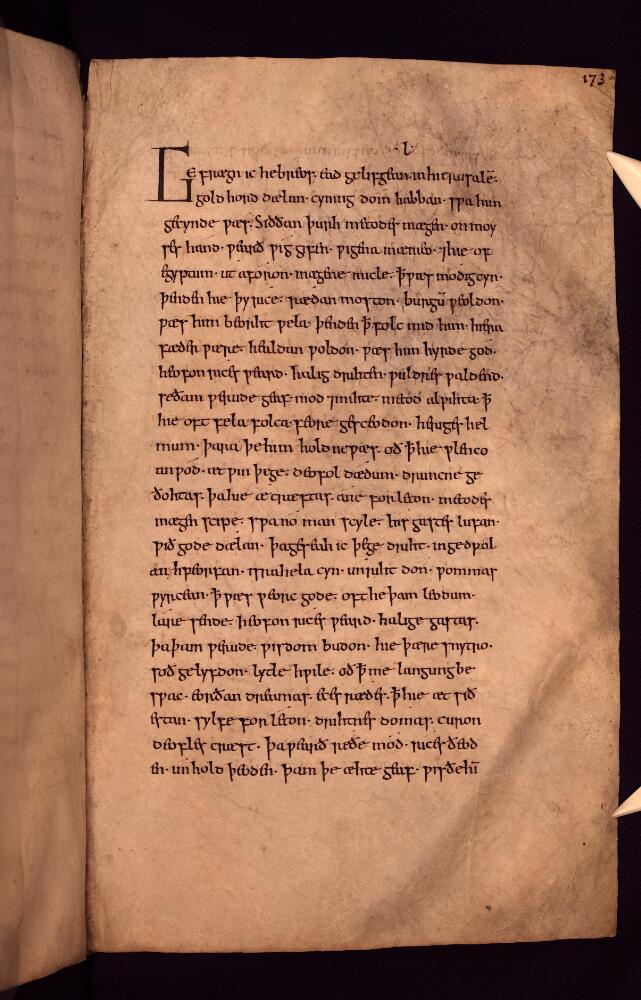
- The first page of Daniel in MS Junius 11.
- Author(s): anonymous
- Language: Old English
- State of existence: two poems, A and B; possibly unfinished
- Manuscript(s): Junius manuscript
- Genre: poetry
- Verse form: alliterative
- Length: 764 lines
- Subject: based on the Book of Daniel
- Personages: Daniel, Three Youths, Nebuchadnezzar II

Daniel is an anonymous Old English poem based loosely on the Biblical Book of Daniel, found in the Junius Manuscript. The author and the date of Daniel are unknown. Critics have argued that Cædmon is the author of the poem, but this theory has been since disproven. Daniel, as it is preserved, is 764 lines long. There have been numerous arguments that there was originally more to this poem than survives today. The majority of scholars, however, dismiss these arguments with the evidence that the text finishes at the bottom of a page, and that there is a simple point, which translators assume indicates the end of a complete sentence. Daniel contains a plethora of lines which Old English scholars refer to as “hypermetric” or long.

Daniel is one of the four major Old Testament prophets, along with Isaiah, Jeremiah, and Ezekiel. The biblical story works through questions of faith and persecution; the poem deals mainly with pride. The Old English Daniel is a warning against pride and there are three warnings in the story. The Israelites were conquered because they lost faith in God, who delivered them from Egypt, and started worshiping idols and this is the first prideful act. The second and third warnings are about internal pride, shown to Nebuchadnezzar II through Daniel's dream interpretations.

== Contents ==
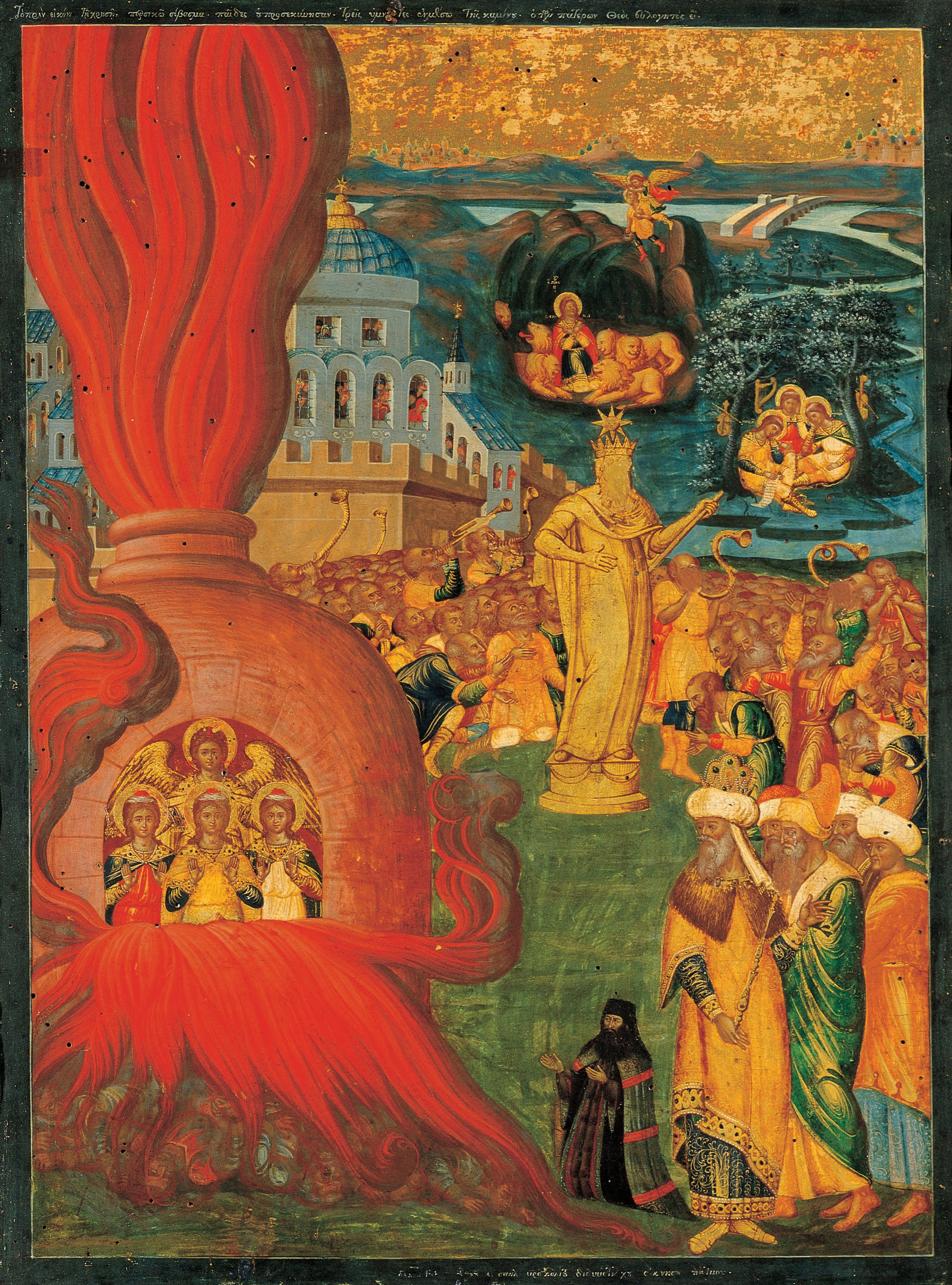
The story of Daniel and the Three Youths in the Fiery Furnace

The Old English Daniel is based only loosely on the Biblical Book of Daniel from which it draws its inspiration. Daniel ignores the majority of the apocalyptic and prophetic writing found towards the end of the Biblical source, and focuses instead on the first five chapters of the narrative. The poem also leaves out Daniel being thrown into the lions’ den.

The primary focus of the Old English author was that of the Three Youths, Daniel and their encounters with the Babylonian king Nebuchadnezzar II (OE Nabuchodnossor). The three men and Daniel were around the age 14 when they were taken away. The three youths are named Ananias, Misael and Azarias. Daniel is called aethele cnithas, meaning that he was to be trained a servant for the king. Daniel was put into servitude and him and the youths were likely made eunuchs. The speculation comes because the master of the eunuchs trained the youths in divination, magic and astrology.

The poem’s first lines speak of the glory of Israel, but then the poem quickly speaks of how prideful the Israelites had become. Then the poem mentions that Israel was conquered for worshiping idols and putting too much faith in man as opposed to God. Daniel is briefly mentioned in the first hundred lines of the poem, but he shows up to interpret God’s signs to Nebuchadnezzar. Daniel was given a new name, Baltassar, when he was made a servant and the other three youths were given new names as well, Sidrach, Misach, and Abdenago. At the end of their three-year training, the king found that they excelled at everything that they were trained in, so he placed them in high places in his court. Daniel soon got to show off his great wisdom because he succeeded when all the other magicians in the kingdom had failed. Daniel was able to recite and interpret King Nebuchadnezzar’s dreams.

Daniel is able to interpret the king’s dream and show him that his pride is becoming out of control, however King Nebuchadnezzar is quick to forget what Daniel told him. The poem then talks about the three youths being thrown into the “fiery furnace” for not being subservient and worshiping the Babylonian gods. The furnace is supposed to represent the end for the youths and the youths represent faith in God. The furnace was so hot that the men who threw them in perished. An angel of God protected the youths from the flames of the furnace. Nebuchadnezzar was told that the men were alive and when he looked into the furnace he saw four men in the furnace and the three youth were unbound. Nebuchadnezzar then told the men to come out of the furnace; he then saw the power of God and gave the men promotions in his court.

The poem says that Nebuchadnezzar is the most arrogant of men (Daniel, i 614). So God punishes him for his wickedness and castes him into exile for a while, but when he comes back he hasn’t changed his ways. So God eventually causes his kingdom to fall to another king, Cyrus the Mede (Cyrus the Great). King Nebuchadnezzar has another dream the night before his kingdom falls. He is flustered and scared because of what the dream showed him. Before, no one in the country could tell the king the dream's meaning, then Daniel recites and interprets the king’s dream for him. Daniel is quick to point out his pride and Nebuchadnezzar changes his ways quickly, but he is too late. The poem points out that Daniel knows what the dream means but he is almost too afraid to tell his king.

Daniel 523-55

"Then the earthly king awoke from his sleep, the dream was at an end. He stood in fright, terrified from the spirit that God sent him. The ill-tempered leader then summoned the whole land. The prideful king then asked all the good men what the dream meant, they knew not how to interpret the dream but they knew an alternative. Daniel, God’s prophet, had the holy spirit give his soul support. Deep within his heart the guardian helped him craft wise words. Again he showed them many wonders, mighty works of God, for men to behold. Then he, the proud and pagan leader, spoke certain words, beginning with the dream, spoke of the horror shown to him. He asked what the dream had to offer, hiding in his heart, he asked Daniel to speak truthful words on what the dream had meant. He ask the wise man to answer his fate. He then was silent; however Daniel understood the truth and understood that his lord was guilty with God. Though hesitant the guide spoke..."

== Division of the text ==
Many scholars divide Daniel into two parts, Daniel A and Daniel B. Daniel A is a retelling of the beginning of the Book of Daniel. Daniel B is read by some scholars to be a version of the Old English poem Azarias in the Exeter Book, which is almost identical in lines 1-71, but less similar in the lines following. Although Daniel B comes later in the poem, it is read as a prayer for deliverance although deliverance is already granted in the first half of the poem (Daniel A). This fact has led many Old English scholars to view Daniel B as an interpolation. There are many other factors supporting this claim, including differences in vocabulary and metrical usage. Yet another piece of evidence that Daniel B seems to be an addition to the original poem lies in the general content of early Old English Christian poetry. Daniel B seems to emphasize the allegorical meaning of the Book of Daniel, which is drastically different from the majority of Old English Christian Poetry written around the approximated date of Daniel.

== Concordance ==
Book of Daniel (Vulgate)	Old English Daniel	Comments	Old English Azarias	Narrative contents
1:1—3:24	lines 1—278	Daniel A		Introduction; Daniel interprets Nebuchadnezzar's first dream; the Three Youths cast into the Fiery Furnace.
3:25—3:50	lines 279—361	Daniel B	lines 1-71	Song of Azarias; introduction to the Song of the Three Children.
3:52—3:90	lines 362—408	Daniel B	lines 72-161a	The Song of the Three Children.
3:81—Chapter 5	lines 409—764	Daniel A		The Three Youths survive; Nebuchadnezzar's second dream; his exile and return; prophecy of end of Babylonian reign and Belshazzar's death.

== Differences between the Old English Daniel and Biblical Daniel ==
Some scholars insist that the Daniel poet was much more interested in the literal interpretation of the Book of Daniel, but others illustrate the author's intention to write allegorically. In the Biblical Book, King Nebuchadnezzar wishes to educate Daniel, but the dramatized OE Daniel has Nebuchadnezzar trying to acquire Daniel's wisdom. This change sets the character of Daniel in a way more consistent with the Old English hero. The three youths are named Ananias, Misael, and Azarias. Daniel is called "aethele cnithas", meaning that he was to be trained a servant for the king. Daniel was put into servitude and him and the youths were also probably made eunuchs, the speculation comes because the master of the eunuchs trained the youths in divination, magic, and astrology. In the Septuagint, the 2nd century B.C.E. Greek translation of the Hebrew Bible, Daniel is also called "archi-eunouchos", which translates to “chief eunuch”; in the Latin Vulgate, Daniel is also called "praepositus eunuchorum". This is something that is not mentioned the Old English Daniel. Another stark contrast is the inclusion of the author's version of the Azarias and the introduction to the Song of Songs. These differences and many others are thought to indicate that the unknown author of Daniel was not simply paraphrasing the Biblical book, but was in fact original in his composition.

== Critical assessment ==
The abrupt ending of the poem seems to denote that the work was unfinished. This assumption is based on the idea that Daniel is a mere translation of the Bible. However, the poem’s focus diverges from that of the Bible in an attempt to state a more distinctive message about pride. The poem achieves this by being less concerned about conveying details of the dreams and Daniel’s prophecies. As the role of Daniel diminishes, the message of pride and humility can be more prevalent and in turn causes Nebuchadnezzar’s role to be increasingly important. The author creates a new perspective by using Nebuchadnezzar. The focus then shifts from Daniel’s prophetic gift to consequences of pride. There is also, then, a stronger link between pride and God’s judgment of pride. This is because Daniel takes on the sole role of being the giver of God’s warnings. Had the author then added Daniel in the Lion’s den, there would have been a shift of focus on Daniel. As a result, Daniel would overshadow the warnings of pride. Also, the accounts that are given in Daniel all have a message about pride and arrogance. In conclusion, Daniel is not just a poetic form of the Biblical book, but rather part of the same story with a different perspective.

== See also ==
- Shadrach, Meshach, and Abednego
- Book of Daniel (Bible)

== Bibliography ==
Editions and translations

- Krapp, G. (ed.). The Junius Manuscript. The Anglo-Saxon Poetic Record 1. New York, 1931. 111-32.
- Bradley, S.A.J. (tr.). Anglo-Saxon Poetry. London; David Campbell, 1995. 66-86.
- R.T. Farrell,Daniel and Azarias, 1974
- Daniel is edited by Alex Ukropen and Martin Foys, along with digital images of its manuscript pages, and translated, in the Old English Poetry in Facsimile Project

Secondary literature

- Anderson, E.R. "Style and Theme in the Old English Daniel." English Studies 68 (1987): 1-23. Reprinted in: The Poems of MS Junius, ed. R.M. Liuzza. New York & London: Routledge, 2002. 229-60.
- Bosse, Roberta Bux and Jennifer Lee Wyatt. "Hrothgar and Nebuchadnezzar. Conversion in Old English Verse." PPL. 257-71.
- Bugge, John. "Virginity and prophecy in the Old English Daniel." English Studies 87.2 (April 2006): 127-47.
- Caie, Graham D. "The Old English Daniel: A Warning Against Pride." English Studies 59 (1978): 1-9.
- George, J.-A. "Hwalas ðec herigað: Creation, Closure and the Hapax Legomena of the OE Daniel." In A Festschrift in Honour of Prof. Jane Roberts' 65th Birthday, eds. Christian Kay and Louise Sylvester. Rodopi, 2000.
- George, J.-A. "Daniel 416-29: An 'Identity Crisis' Resolved?'" Medium Ævum 60.1 (1991): 73-6.
- George, J.-A. "Repentance and Retribution: The Use of the Book of Daniel in Old and Middle English Texts." The John Rylands Library Bulletin 77.3 (1995): 177-92.
- Harbus, Antonina. "Nebuchadnezzar's dreams in the Old English Daniel." English Studies 75.6 (Nov. 1994): 489-508.
- Remley, Paul G. Old English Biblical Verse: Studies in Genesis, Exodus, and Daniel. Cambridge Studies in Anglo-Saxon England 16. Cambridge and New York: CUP, 1996.
- Remley, Paul G. "Daniel, the Three Youths Fragment and the Transmission of Old English Verse." Anglo-Saxon England 31 (2002): 81-140.
- Sharma, Manish. "Nebuchadnezzar and the Defiance of Measure in the Old English Daniel." English Studies 86.2 (April 2005): 103-26.
- Encyclopedic entries in:
  - Medieval England: An Encyclopedia, eds. Paul E. Szarmach, M. Teresa Tavormina, Joel T. Rosenthal. New York: Garland Pub., 1998.
  - The Blackwell Encyclopedia of Anglo-Saxon England, ed. Michael Lapidge. Oxford, 1991.
  - Dictionary of the Middle Ages, ed. Joseph R. Strayer.
  - Catholic Encyclopedia
  - Encyclopedia of the Middle Ages, ed. Andre Vauchez; 2002.
