= The Tremulous Hand of Worcester =

13th-century scribe of Old English manuscripts

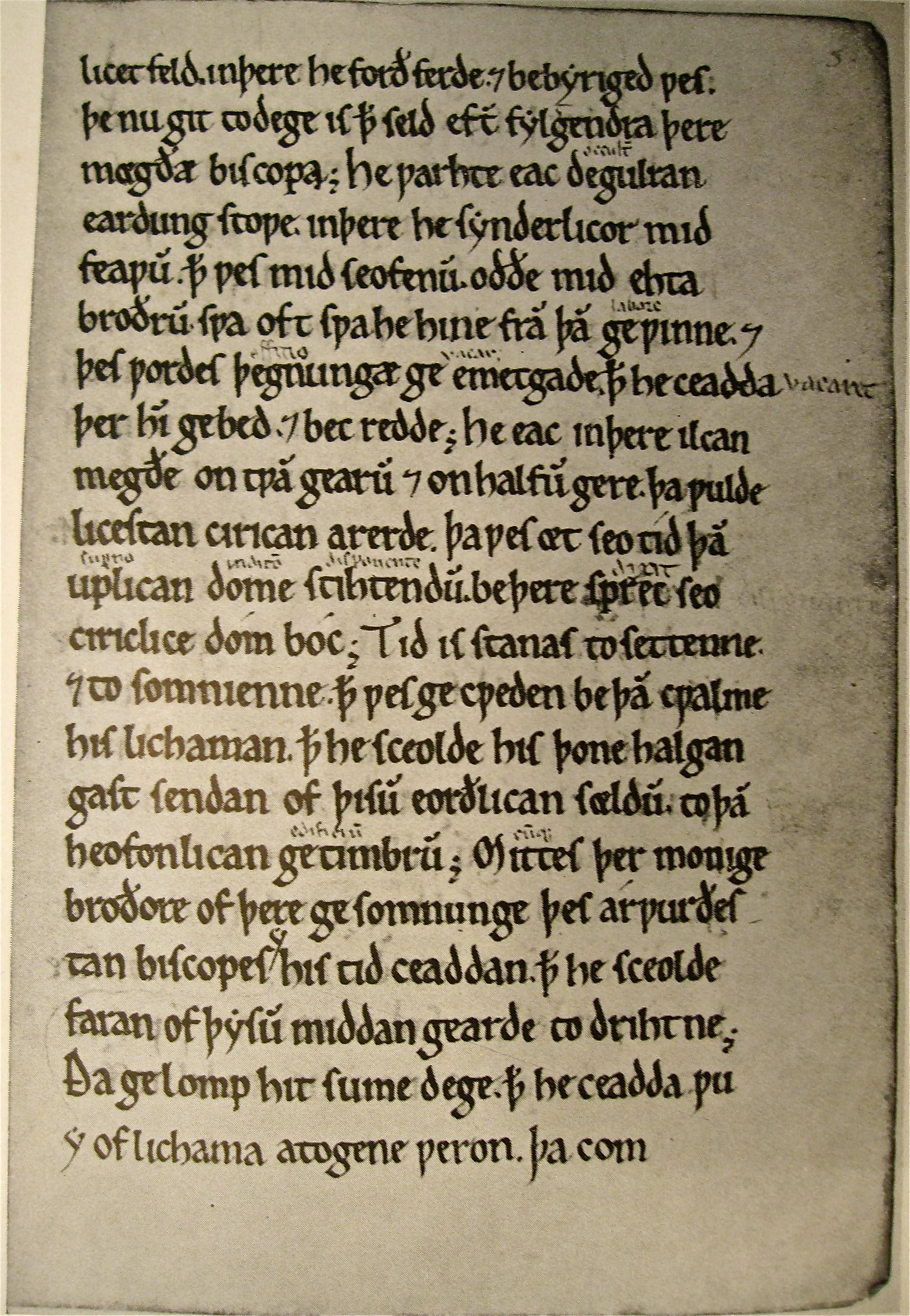
Life of St. Chad, glossed by The Tremulous Hand

The Tremulous Hand of Worcester is the name given to a 13th-century scribe of Old English manuscripts with handwriting characterized by large, shaky, leftward leaning figures usually written in light brown ink. He is assumed to have worked in Worcester Priory, because all manuscripts identified as his work have been connected to Worcester.

== Variation in work ==
The variability of his work indicates that the Tremulous Hand of Worcester had a long career in glossing. He glossed sometimes in Middle English and sometimes in Latin and is thought to have written over 50,000 glosses.

In some manuscripts one out of every four words is glossed, while in others only one or two glosses appear on a page. While glossing Old English texts he is also known to have edited the works, adding punctuation marks and in what is identified as his early work changing the vowels and consonants of Old English words to be more like their Middle English counterparts. His earliest work is predominantly glossed in Middle English, but later he begins to gloss equally in both Middle English and Latin.

Although he is most typically identified by light brown ink, the Tremulous Hand used multiple media types and his glossing evolved throughout his career, showing a considerable range characterized by variable "layers". His hand tremor grew worse with time; also whereas in his earliest glosses he uses contemporary Middle English that reveals a close kinship with the language of the Ancrene Wisse manuscript Nero A.xiv (his handwriting also resembles that scribe's), he later appears to be collecting Old English words in the margin, perhaps in order to compile a glossary. He often indicates that something should be noted (using the Latin word nota or an abbreviation) and sometimes makes a doodle.

== Layers ==
In order to differentiate the Tremulous Hand of Worcester’s varied glosses, Christine Franzen, a literary scholar, has categorized his work into seven "layers":

- M: The Mature Layer is the most characteristic of The Tremulous Hand of Worcester. It is glossed in light brown ink, is large in size with a conspicuous leftward angle. The tremble is most noticeable in the downward stroke. Middle English and Latin are used almost equally in this layer. Additionally, many of the glosses contain Latin abbreviations.
- B: The Bold Layer is related to the M layer but considered to be earlier in The Tremulous Hand of Worcester’s career. The letters are small and neat with a subtle leftward slant and downward tremble. The B layer is considered to be the neatest and most exact. The lettering is small, compact and cohesive. The B layer is written in dark brown ink.
- P: The Pencil layer is considered to be roughly contemporary with the B layer, but earlier because some B letters occur on top of P letters. This layer is faint and often illegible, and written with a light pencil-like medium. The P layer is found in the margins of manuscripts, written equally in Middle English and Latin.
- C: The Crayon Layer is considered to be roughly contemporary with the M layer, but earlier because some M letters occur on top of C letters. This layer is written with a waxy, crayon-like material in the margins of manuscripts. It has large, distinctly sloped lettering and is written equally in Middle English and Latin.
- D: The Dark Layer is written almost entirely in Middle English with considerable pressure and in dark ink. The letters are small and neat, but have a distinct tremble. Only three manuscripts appear in the D layer, and they are all homilies. Additionally, the D layer has the most erasures.
- T: The Text Layer applies specifically to the Worcester Cathedral MS F.174. This is an untidy, uneven text that seems unprofessional. It is written in dark ink with a distinct downward tremble and a "þ" identical to the M layer.
- L: The Large Layer is related to the T Layer, but differs in the lettering of "d". In the Large Layer, the d has a round back.

Franzen, however, commented informally at a later date that identification of as many as seven layers was perhaps "over zealous".

== Manuscripts ==
Notable glosses by the Tremulous Hand occur in Ælfric of Eynsham's Grammar and Glossary, and in the Worcester manuscripts, St. Bede's Lament, The Soul’s Address to the Body and an Old English translation of Bede's Historia ecclesiastica gentis anglorum. The Tremulous Hand is also thought to have glossed a segment of the Bodleian manuscript Junius, which contains the earliest Middle English translation of the Nicene Creed. He is considered to have over 50,000 glosses in total. Only one manuscript remains in Worcester, which was discovered in 1837 by the antiquary Sir Thomas Phillipps, bound into the cover of later Cathedral muniments.

== Tremor diagnosis ==
The weight of the evidence in the features of the handwriting of the Tremulous Hand points to essential tremor as his neurological condition. This diagnosis takes into account characteristics of the tremor including its regular amplitude and regular frequency, and that it exhibited fluctuations in severity. Evidence points away from other conditions such as Parkinson's disease, writer's cramp and dystonic tremor. The tremor also shows signs of rapid improvement, possibly due to a combination of rest and the consumption of alcoholic beverages, and this response is consistent with essential tremor.

== Sources ==
- Franzen, Christine. "On the Attribution of Additions in Oxford, Bodleian MS Bodley 343 to the Tremulous Hand of Worcester". ANQ: A Quarterly Journal of Short Articles, Notes, and Reviews, 2006 Winter; 19 (1): 7–8.
- Franzen, Christine. The Tremulous Hand of Worcester: A Study of Old English in the Thirteenth Century. Oxford English Monographs. Oxford: Clarendon Press, 1991. ISBN 9780198117421
- Franzen, Christine. "The Tremulous Hand of Worcester and the Nero Scribe of the Ancrene Wisse". Medium Ævum, 2003; 72 (1): 13–31.
- Thorpe, Deborah E.; Alty, Jane E. (October 2015). "What type of tremor did the medieval 'Tremulous Hand of Worcester' have?". Brain. 138 (10): 3123–3127. doi:10.1093/brain/awv232. PMC 4671480. PMID 26324723.
