= South Asian riddles =

Riddles have at times been an important literary or folk-literary form in South Asia. Indeed, it is thought that the world's earliest surviving poetic riddles are those found in the Sanskrit Rigveda.

== Terminology ==
According to Richard Salomon, "the Sanskrit term that most closely corresponds to the English 'riddle', and which is usually translated thereby, is prahelikā—a term that is not only of uncertain etymology but is also subject to widely differing interpretations and classifications."

In Tamil, riddles are called Vidukathai. They circulate in both folk and literary forms.

== Sanskrit ==
According to Ludwik Sternbach,

Sanskrit riddles had to be composed in verse, preferably in four pāda-s but no more than eight pāda-s. Their solution had to be based on clear language and no obscene meaning could ever be suggested in treatises of poetics and other classical sources... They were usually difficult to solve and therefore required commentaries: they were real intelligence tests and they required from the receiver of the riddle not only wit and cleverness, but also thorough knowledge of mythology, grammar, rhetorics (including knowledge of, at least, the basic alakāra-literature), phonetics, metrics, mathematics, languages and, in particular, a vast knowledge of Sanskrit vocabulary.

Hymn 164 of the first book of the Rigveda can be understood to comprise a series of riddles or enigmas which are now obscure but may have been an enigmatic exposition of the pravargya ritual. These riddles overlap in significant part with a collection of forty-seven in the Atharvaveda; riddles also appear elsewhere in Vedic texts. According to Archer Taylor,

The highly sophisticated quality of many Sanskrit riddles can perhaps be adequately illustrated by one rather simple example ... "Who moves in the air? Who makes a noise on seeing a thief? Who is the enemy of lotuses? Who is the climax of fury?" The answers to the first three questions, when combined in the manner of a charade, yield the answer to the fourth question. The first answer is bird (vi), the second dog (çva), the third sun (mitra), and the whole is Viçvamitra, Rama's first teacher and counselor and a man noted for his outbursts of rage.

Accordingly, riddles are treated in early studies of Sanskrit poetry such as Daṇḍin's seventh- or eighth-century Kāvyādarśa (iii.96-124), the Kāvyālaṃkāra of Bhāmaha (c. 700), or the fifteenth-century Sāhityadarpaṇa by Viśwanātha Kaviraja. Thus, for example, Daṇḍin cites this as an example of a name-riddle (nāmaprahelikā): "A city, five letters, the middle one is a nasal, the ruling lineage of which is an eight-letter word" (the answer being Kāñcī, ruled by the Pallavāḥ dynasty).

Early narrative literature also sometimes includes riddles. The Mahabharata also portrays riddle-contests and includes riddles accordingly. For example, this portrays Yaksha Prashna, a series of riddles posed by a nature-spirit (yaksha) to Yudhishthira, and, in the third book, the story of Ashtavakra. Ashtavakra is the son of one Kahoda, who loses a wisdom-contest to Bandin and is drowned in consequence. Though only a boy, Ashtavakra goes to the court of King Janaka to seek revenge on Bandin. On arrival, he is presented with a series of riddles by Janaka, starting with the widespread year-riddle: what has six naves, twelve axles, twenty-four joints, and three hundred and sixty spokes? (The year.) Janaka then asks a mythic riddle about thunder and lightning, and then a series of simpler, paradox-based riddles like 'what does not close its eye when asleep?' Having won Janaka's approval, Ashtavakra goes on to defeat Bandin in a further wisdom-contest, and has Bandin drowned. Meanwhile, Baital Pachisi (Tales of a Vetala), originating before the twelfth century CE, features twenty four tales, each culminating in a riddle or similar puzzle. Unusually, the challenge here is for the hero to not solve a riddle.

Sanskrit riddles continued to be produced and collected through the Middle Ages. Most collections have yet to be edited, but one major one was the Vidagdhamukhamaṇḍana, and an initial catalogue of this and others is provided by Ludwik Sternbach.

== Medieval Indic languages ==
The first riddle collection in a medieval Indic language is traditionally thought to be by Amir Khusro (1253–1325), though it is debated whether he actually composed the collection. If he did, he wrote his riddles in the Indic language he called Hindawi rather than his usual Persian. The collection contains 286 riddles, divided into six groups, "apparently on the basis of the structure of the riddle and the structure of the answer"; "these riddles are 'in the style of the common people', but most scholars believe they were composed by Khusro". The riddles are in Mātrika metre; one example is:

Nar naari kehlaati ha',
aur bin warsha jal jati hai;
Purkh say aaway purkh mein jaai,
na di kisi nay boojh bataai.

Translation:

Is known by both masculine and feminine names,
And burns up without rain;
Originates from a man and goes into a man,
But no one has been able to guess what it is.

The emboldened text here indicates a clue woven into the text: it is a pun on nadi ("river").

== Modern riddles ==
A noted semi-legendary Dogri language riddler in nineteenth-century India was the carpenter Kavi-Lakkhu (C17 or C18) or Duggar Lakkhu (c. 1750-1840).

They circulate in both folk and literary forms. Tamil riddles include descriptive, question, rhyming and entertaining riddles.

Riddles are mostly found in oral form. The structure resembles folk songs. Most of the riddles are based on the living things and objects around in day-to-day life. A sample riddle is given below.

Polutu ponaal poontottam;
vitintu parttal, veruntottam. atu enna?

— Vaanam
Translation:

If the sun sets, a flower-garden;
but if you look at it after dawn, an empty garden. What is it?

— The sky

=== Collections ===
As of the 1970s, folklorists had not undertaken extensive collecting of riddles in India, but a fairly substantial corpus had nonetheless been accrued. Collections include:

- An Indian Riddle Book: special issue of Man in India, 23.4 (1943), pp. 265–352. Includes samples of riddles from numerous regions in English translation.
- Tamil Rätsel aus mündlicher Überlieferung, ed. and trans. by Dieter B. Knapp (Wiesbaden: Harrassowitz, 2010); ISBN 978-3-447-19015-2. An extensive collection of oral Tamil riddles with German translation.

An Eastern Tharu riddle about a bitter gourd and a bird coop
