= Dharmadasa =

Dharmadasa can refer to:

- Dharmadāsa (fl. 7th – c. 11th-century AD), Indian author of the Sanskrit poetry and riddle collection Vidagdhamukhamaṇḍana
- I. M. Dharmadasa, Sri Lankan physicist
- Dharmadasa Walpola (1927–1983), Sri Lankan musician
- Dharmadasa Wanniarachchi (d. 2007), Sri Lankan politician
- Dharmadasa Banda (1938–2010), Sri Lankan politician
