= Featherless bird riddle =

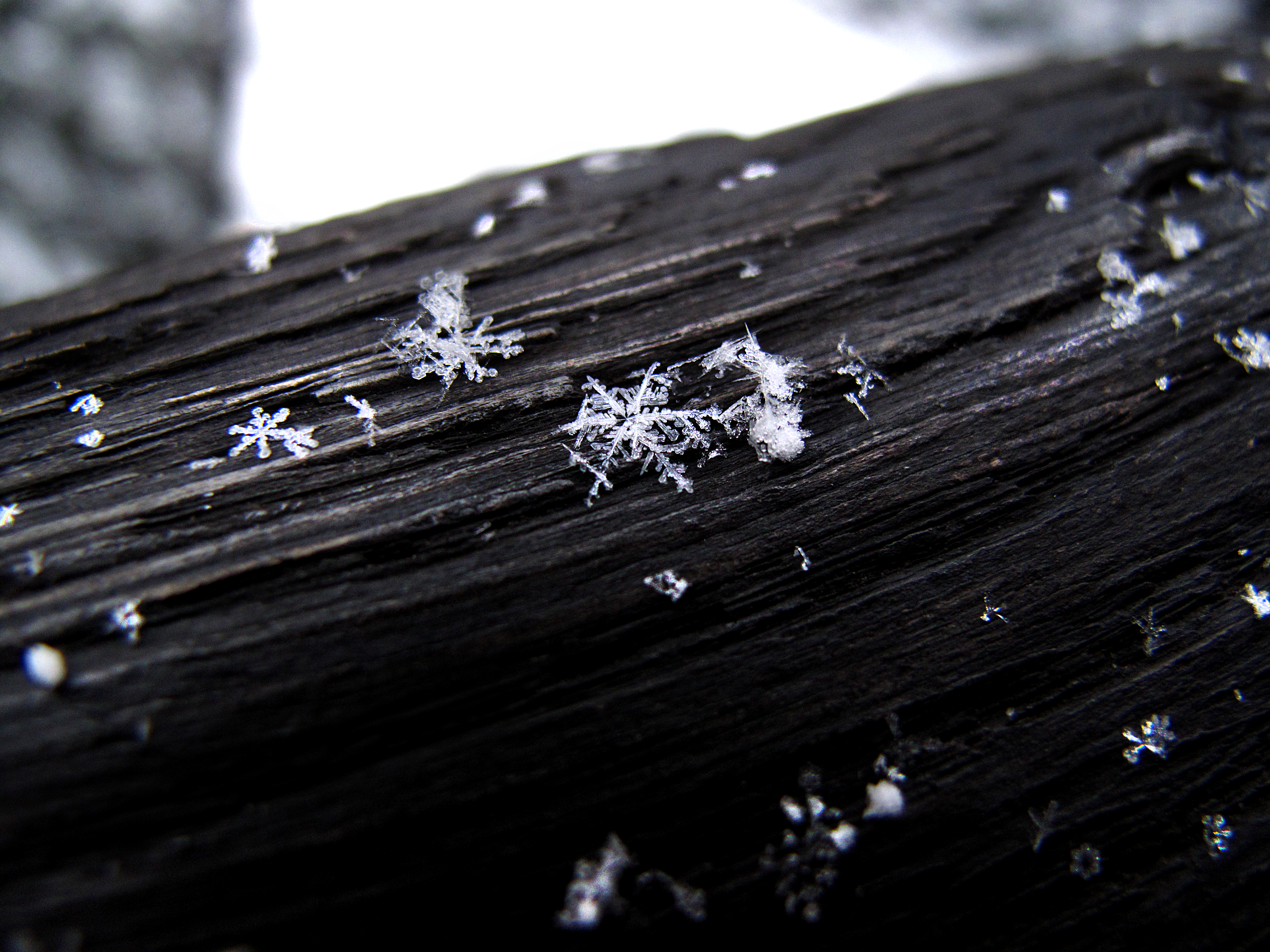
Snowflakes falling on a handrail

The featherless bird riddle is an international riddle type that compares a snowflake to a bird. In the nineteenth century, it attracted considerable scholarly attention because it was seen as a possible reflex of ancient Germanic riddling, arising from magical incantations. Although the language of the riddle is reminiscent of European charms, later work, particularly by Antti Aarne, showed that it occurred widely throughout Europe─particularly central Europe─and that it is therefore an international riddle type. Archer Taylor concluded that 'the equating of a snowflake to a bird and the sun to a maiden without hands is an elementary idea that cannot yield much information about Germanic myth'.

== Versions ==
The riddle is first attested in Latin, as the fourth of six anonymous 'enigmata risibilia' ('silly riddles'), known today as the Reichenau Riddles, found in the early tenth-century manuscript Karlsruher Codex Augiensis 205, copied at Reichenau Abbey:

Volavit volucer sine plumis;
sedit in arbore sine foliis;
venit homo absque manibus;
conscendit illum sine pedibus;
assavit illum sine igne;
comedit illum sine ore.

Translation:

It flew on wings without feathers;
sat in a tree without leaves;
a person came without hands;
set it in motion without feet;
roasted it without fire;
consumed it without a mouth.

That is, the snowflake was blown by the wind and melted by the sun.

A representative early-modern German version is:

Es kam ein Vogel federlos,
saß auf dem Baume blattlos,
da kam die Jungfer mundlos
und fraß den Vogel federlos
von dem Baume blattlos.

Translation:

There came a bird featherless
sat on the trees leafless
There came a maiden speechless
And ate the bird featherless
From off the tree leafless.

That is, 'the snow (featherless bird) lies on a bare tree in winter (leafless tree), and the sun (speechless maiden) causes the snow to melt (ate the featherless bird)'.

The best known English example runs

White bird featherless
Flew from Paradise,
Perched upon the castle wall;
Up came Lord John landless,
Took it up handless,
And rode away horseless to the King's white hall.

An Icelandic example runs:

Fuglinn flaug fjaðralaus,
settíst á vegginn beinlaus,
þá kom maður handlaus,
og skaut fuglinn bogalaus.

Translation:

The bird flew featherless,
set itself on a wall legless;
then came a handless person,
and shot the bird bowless.
