= Riddle =

Statement with a double meaning used as a puzzle

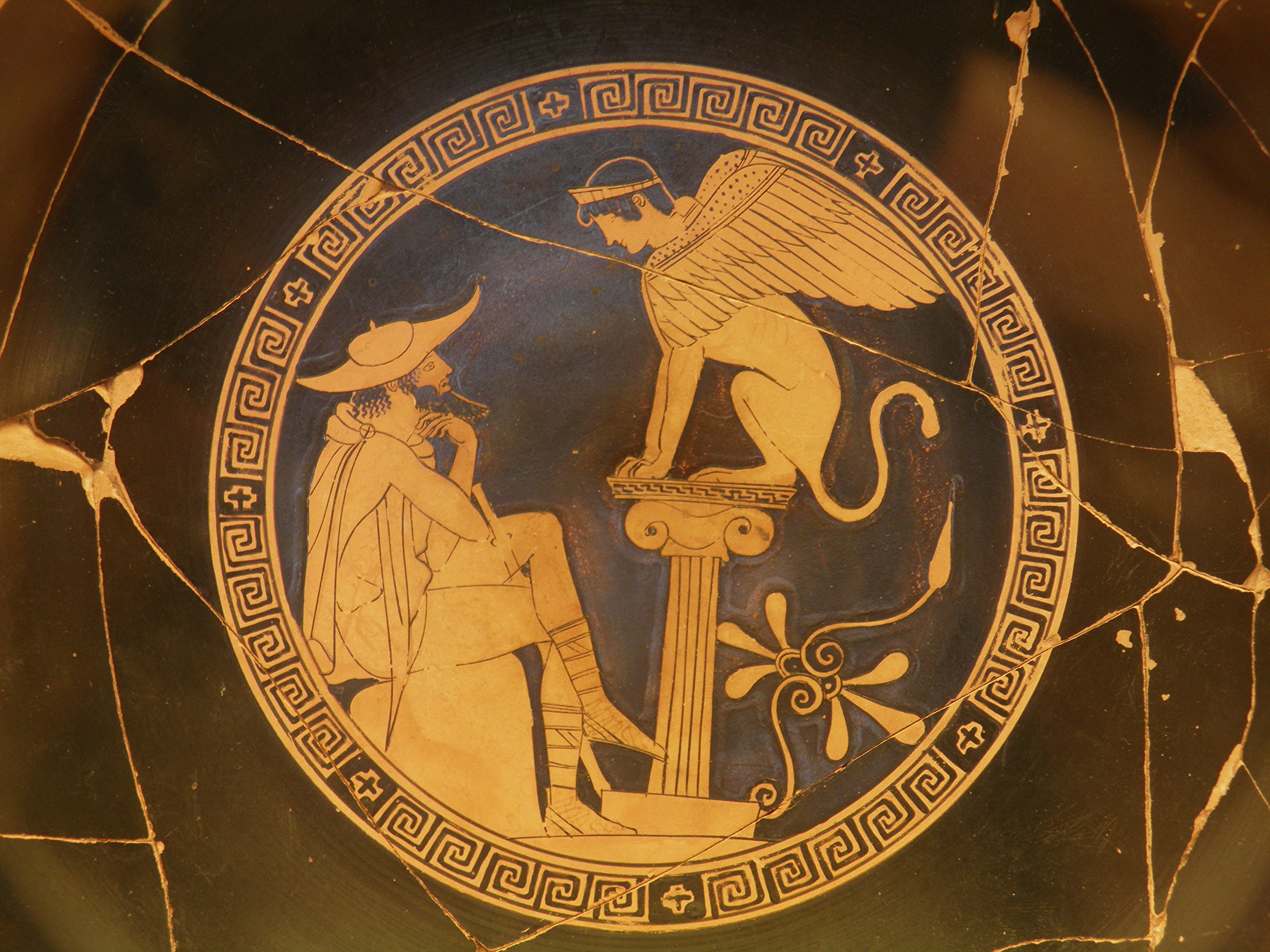
Attic red-figure kylix c. 470 BCE: Oedipus ponders the riddle of the Sphinx, with the fate of Thebes at stake

A riddle is a statement, question, or phrase having a double or veiled meaning, put forth as a puzzle to be solved. Riddles are of two types: enigmas, which are problems generally expressed in metaphorical or allegorical language that require ingenuity and careful thinking for their solution, and conundrums, which are questions relying for their effects on punning in either the question or the answer.

Archer Taylor says that "we can probably say that riddling is a universal art" and cites riddles from hundreds of different cultures including Finnish, Hungarian, American Indian, Chinese, Russian, Dutch, and Filipino sources amongst many others. Many riddles and riddle-themes are internationally widespread.

In the assessment of Elli Köngäs-Maranda (originally writing about Malaitian riddles, but with an insight that has been taken up more widely), whereas myths serve to encode and establish social norms, "riddles make a point of playing with conceptual boundaries and crossing them for the intellectual pleasure of showing that things are not quite as stable as they seem" — though the point of doing so may still ultimately be to "play with boundaries, but ultimately to affirm them".

== Definitions and research ==
=== Etymology ===
The modern English word riddle shares its origin with the word read, both stemming from the Common Germanic verb *rēdaną, which meant "to interpret" or "guess". From this verb came the West Germanic noun *rādislī, literally meaning "thing to be guessed" or "thing to be interpreted". From this comes Dutch raadsel, German Rätsel, and Old English *rǣdels, the latter of which became modern English riddle.

=== Definitions ===
Defining riddles precisely is hard and has attracted a fair amount of scholarly debate. The first major modern attempt to define the riddle within Western scholarship was by Robert Petsch in 1899, with another seminal contribution, inspired by structuralism, by Robert A. Georges and Alan Dundes in 1963. Georges and Dundes suggested that "a riddle is a traditional verbal expression which contains one or more descriptive elements, a pair of which may be in opposition; the referent of the elements is to be guessed". There are many possible subsets of the riddle, including charades, droodles, and some jokes.

In some traditions and contexts, riddles may overlap with proverbs. For example, the Russian phrase "Nothing hurts it, but it groans all the time" can be deployed as a proverb (when its referent is a hypochondriac) or as a riddle (when its referent is a pig). Some consider riddles to be a subcategory for the literature. Whereas, one of earliest definitions identified the riddle as a form of metaphor, first likely ascribed by Aristotle, where he states that "metaphors imply riddles", in this classical tradition fall definitions similar to one proposed by Gaston Paris, in which he defines the riddle as "a metaphor or a group of metaphors, the employment of which has not passed into common use, and the explanation of which is not self-evident."

=== Research ===
Much academic research on riddles has focused on collecting, cataloguing, defining, and typologising riddles. Key work on cataloguing and typologising riddles was published by Antti Aarne in 1918–20, and by Archer Taylor. In the case of ancient riddles recorded without solutions, considerable scholarly energy has also gone into proposing and debating solutions.

Whereas previously researchers had tended to take riddles out of their social performance contexts, the rise of anthropology in the 1950s and 1960s encouraged more researchers to study the social role of riddles and riddling, highlighting their role in re-orienting reality in the face of fear and anxiety. However, wide-ranging studies of riddles have tended to be limited to Western countries, with Asian and African riddles being relatively neglected.

Riddles have also attracted linguists, often studying riddles from the point of view of semiotics; meanwhile, the twenty-first century has seen the rise of extensive work on medieval European riddles from the point of view of eco-criticism, exploring how riddles can inform us about people's conceptualisation and exploration of their environment.

== International riddles ==
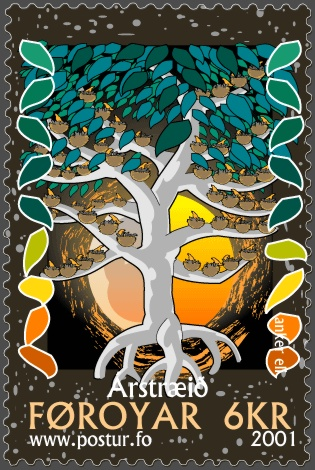
Tree of the year – a Faroese stamp depicting a traditional Faroese version of the year-riddle.

Many riddles appear in similar form across many countries, and often continents. Borrowing of riddles happens both on a local scale and across great distances. Kofi Dorvlo gives an example of a riddle that has been borrowed from the Ewe language by speakers of the neighboring Logba language: "This woman has not been to the riverside for water, but there is water in her tank". The answer is "a coconut". On a much wider scale, the Riddle of the Sphinx has also been documented in the Marshall Islands, possibly carried there by Western contacts in the last two centuries.

Key examples of internationally widespread riddles follow, based on the classic (European-focused) study by Antti Aarne.

=== Writing-riddle ===
The basic form of the writing-riddle is 'White field, black seeds', where the field is a page and the seeds are letters. An example is the eighth- or ninth-century Veronese Riddle:

Se pareba boves
alba pratalia araba
albo versorio teneba
negro semen seminaba

Translation:

In front of him (he) led oxen
White fields (he) ploughed
A white plough (he) held
A black seed (he) sowed.

Here, the oxen are the scribe's finger(s) and thumb, and the plough is the pen. Among literary riddles, riddles on the pen and other writing equipment are particularly widespread.

=== Year-riddle ===
The year-riddle is found across Eurasia. For example, a riddle in the Sanskrit Rig Veda, from around 1500–1000 BCE, describes a 'twelve-spoked wheel, upon which stand 720 sons of one birth' (i.e. the twelve months of the year, which together supposedly have 360 days and 360 nights).

=== Person-riddle ===
The most famous example of this type is the riddle of the Sphinx. This Estonian example shows the pattern:

Hommikul käib nelja,
lõuna-ajal kahe,
õhtul kolme jalaga

Translation:

It goes in the morning on four feet,
at lunch-time on two,
at evening on three

The riddle describes a crawling baby, a standing person, and an old person with a walking stick.

=== Two-legs, three-legs, and four-legs ===
This type includes riddles along the lines of this German example:

Zweibein sass auf Dreibein und ass Einbein.
Da kam Vierbein und nahm Zweibein das Einbein.
Da nahm Zweibein Dreibein und schlug damit Vierbein,
dass Vierbein Einbein fallen liess.

Translation:

Two-legs sat on Three-legs and ate One-leg.
Then Four-legs came and took One-leg from Two-legs.
Then Two-legs took Three-legs and with it struck Four-legs,
so that Four-legs let One-leg go.

The conceit here is that Two-legs is a person, Three-legs is a three-legged stool, Four-legs is a dog, and One-leg is a ham hock.

=== Four Hang; Two Point the Way ===
An example of Four Hang; Two Point the Way, to which the pre-eminent solution is 'cow' is given here in thirteenth-century Icelandic form:

Fjórir hanga,
fjórir ganga,
tveir veg vísa,
tveir hundum varða,
einn eptir drallar
ok jafnan heldr saurugr.
Heiðrekr konungr,
hyggðu at gátu!

Translation:

Four are hanging,
Four are walking,
Two point the way out,
Two ward the dogs off,
One ever dirty
Dangles behind it.
This riddle ponder
O prince Heidrek!

The cow has four teats, four legs, two horns, two back legs, and one tail.

=== Featherless bird-riddle ===
The featherless bird-riddle is best known in Central Europe. An English version is:

White bird featherless
Flew from Paradise,
Perched upon the castle wall;
Up came Lord John landless,
Took it up handless,
And rode away horseless to the King's white hall.

Here, a snowflake falls from the sky, and is blown off the wall by the wind.

== Riddle-traditions by region ==
The riddle was at times a prominent literary form in the ancient and medieval world, so riddles are extensively, if patchily, attested in our written records from these periods. More recently, riddles have been collected from oral tradition by scholars in many parts of the world.

=== Mesopotamia ===
Some of the earliest recorded riddles come from Ancient Sumer, with the oldest tablet said to be dated around 2000 BCE. In Babylon, these were primarily copied for schoolbooks, theorized to have been written off oral tradition. The answers to some of these riddles are not preserved; examples include "my knees hasten, my feet do not rest, a shepherd without pity drives me to pasture" (a river? A rowboat?); "you went and took the enemy's property; the enemy came and took your property" (a weaving shuttle?); "who becomes pregnant without conceiving, who becomes fat without eating?" (a raincloud?). Due to this, they had been formally mistaken to be proverbs until 1960, where Edmund I. Gordon proved of their presence, this being initially attempted by Martin Jäger in 1893. Many of these were then identified to be riddles by the concluding words ki-búr-bi (meaning: "Its solution").

The Sumerian genre term for 'riddle' is i-bi-lu-(dug-ga), meaning both tēltu and hittu. The former a word for "saying" or "proverb" and the latter, translated to Akkadian, "riddle". Theorized to be cognate with the Hebrew hîdāh.

One example, being the most well-known riddle of the Sumerians goes:

é dingir-gin uru ki-ga-ra
é u dub-šen-gin gada mu-un-dul
é uz-gim ki-gal-la gub-ba
igi-nu-bad ba-an-ku
igi-bad ba-an-ta-è

Translation:

A house based on a foundation like the skies,
A house one has covered with a veil like a (secret) tablet box,
A house set on a base like a 'goose',
One enters it blind,
Leaves it seeing.

The imperfect knowledge of the language as well as the chronological and cultural distance make the understanding of these riddles difficult. Making the meanings of the first three verses obscured by phonological ambiguties, double-entendres, and all kinds of word plays which are essential to the genre. All the while, the final two make the answer apparent; with it being a (scribal) school.

=== South Asia ===
It is thought that the world's earliest surviving poetic riddles are found in the Sanskrit Rigveda. Hymn 164 of the first book of the Rigveda can be seen as a series of riddles or enigmas which are now obscure but may have been an enigmatic exposition of the pravargya ritual. These riddles overlap in significantly with a collection of forty-seven in the Atharvaveda; riddles also appear elsewhere in Vedic texts. Taylor cited the following example: '"Who moves in the air? Who makes a noise on seeing a thief? Who is the enemy of lotuses? Who is the climax of fury?" The answers to the first three questions, when combined in the manner of a charade, yield the answer to the fourth question. The first answer is bird (vi), the second dog (śvā), the third sun (mitra), and the whole is Vishvamitra, Rama's first teacher and counselor and a man noted for his outbursts of rage'.

Accordingly, riddles are treated in early studies of Sanskrit poetry such as Daṇḍin's seventh- or eighth-century Kāvyādarśa.

Early narrative literature also sometimes includes riddles, most notably the Mahabharata, which includes the Yaksha Prashna, a series of riddles posed by a nature-spirit (yaksha) to Yudhishthira.

The first riddle collection in a medieval Indic language is traditionally thought to be the riddles of Amir Khusrow (1253–1325), written in Hindawi verse, using the mātrika metre.

As of the 1970s, folklorists had not undertaken extensive collection of riddles in India, but riddling was known to be thriving as a form of folk-literature, sometimes in verse. Riddles have also been collected in Tamil.

An Eastern Tharu riddle about a pigeon coop

=== Hebrew, Arabic and Persian ===
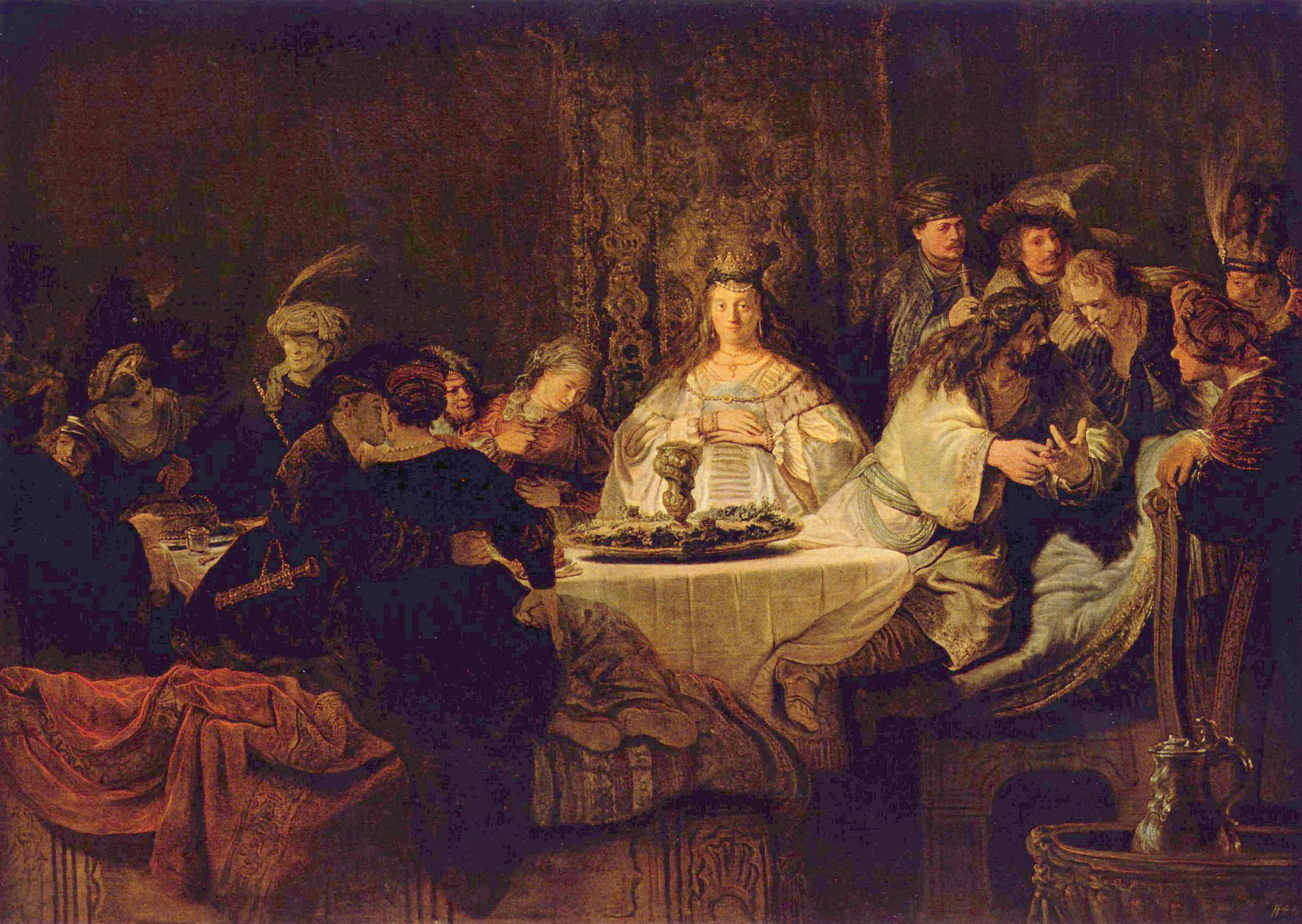
Rembrandt Harmensz. van Rijn's 1638 The Wedding of Samson, depicting Samson (right of centre) posing Samson's riddle

While riddles are not numerous in the Bible, they are present, most famously in Samson's riddle in Judges xiv.14, but also in I Kings 10:1–13 (where the Queen of Sheba tests Solomon's wisdom), and in the Talmud. Sirach also mentions riddles as a popular dinner pastime, while the Aramaic Story of Ahikar contains a long section of proverbial wisdom that in some versions also contains riddles. Otherwise, riddles are sparse in ancient Semitic writing.

In the medieval period, however, verse riddles, alongside other puzzles and conundrums, became a significant literary form in the Arabic-speaking world, and accordingly in Islamic Persian culture and (particularly in Al-Andalus) in Hebrew. Since early Arabic and Persian poetry often features rich, metaphorical description, and ekphrasis, there is a natural overlap in style and approach between poetry generally and riddles specifically; literary riddles are therefore often a subset of the descriptive poetic form known in both traditions as wasf. Riddles are attested in anthologies of poetry and in prosimetrical portrayals of riddle-contests in Arabic maqāmāt and in Persian epics such as the Shahnameh. Meanwhile, in Hebrew, Dunash ben Labrat (920–990), credited with transposing Arabic metres into Hebrew, composed a number of riddles, mostly apparently inspired by folk-riddles. Other Hebrew-writing exponents included Moses ibn Ezra, Yehuda Alharizi, Judah Halevi, Immanuel the Roman, and Israel Onceneyra.

In both Arabic and Persian, riddles seem to have become increasingly scholarly in style over time, increasingly emphasising riddles and puzzles in which the interpreter has to resolve clues to letters and numbers to put together the word which is the riddle's solution.

Riddles have been collected by modern scholars throughout the Arabic-speaking world.

=== Europe ===
==== Greek ====
Riddles are known to have been popular in Greece in Hellenistic times, and possibly before; they were prominent among the entertainments and challenges presented at symposia. Oracles were also represented as speaking in often riddlic language. However, the first significant corpus of Greek riddles survives in an anthology of earlier material known as the Greek Anthology, which contains about 50 verse riddles, probably put into its present form by Constantine Cephalas, working in the tenth century CE. Most surviving ancient Greek riddles are in verse. In the second chapter of Book III of Aristotle's Rhetoric, the philosopher stated that "good riddles do, in general, provide us with satisfactory metaphors: for metaphors imply riddles, and therefore a good riddle can furnish a good metaphor."

Literary riddles were also composed in Byzantium, from perhaps the tenth century with the work of John Geometres, into the fifteenth century, along with a neo-Byzantine revival in around the early eighteenth century. There was a particular peak around the long twelfth century.

==== Latin and Romance ====
Two Latin riddles are preserved as graffiti in the Basilica at Pompeii. The pre-eminent collection of ancient Latin riddles is a collection of 100 hexametrical riddles by Symphosius which were influential on later medieval Latin writers. The Bern Riddles, a collection of Latin riddles clearly modelled on Symphosius, were composed in the early seventh century by an unknown author, perhaps in northern Italy. Symphosius's collection also inspired a number of Anglo-Saxon riddlers who wrote in Latin. They remained influential in medieval Castilian tradition, being the basis for the second set of riddles in the thirteenth-century Libro de Apolonio, posed by Apolonio's daughter Tarsiana to her father.

The perhaps eighth- or ninth-century Veronese Riddle is a key witness to the linguistic transition from Latin to Romance, but riddles are otherwise rare in medieval romance languages. However, in the early modern period, printed riddle collections were published in French, including the Adevineaux amoureux (printed in Bruges by Colard Mansion around 1479); and Demandes joyeuses en maniere de quolibets, the basis for Wynkyn de Worde's 1511 Demaundes Joyous.

==== The Germanic-speaking world ====
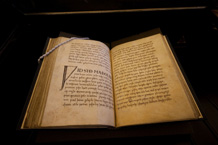
The Exeter Book: the principal manuscript of medieval Germanic-language riddles.

Riddles survive only fragmentarily in Old High German: three, very short, possible examples exist in manuscripts from the Monastery of St Gallen, but, while certainly cryptic, they are not necessarily riddles in a strict sense. About 150 survive in Middle High German, mostly quoted in other literary contexts. Likewise, riddles are rare in Old Norse: almost all occur in one section of Hervarar saga ok Heiðreks, in which the god Óðinn propounds around 37 riddles (depending on the manuscript). These riddles do, however, provide insights into Norse mythology, medieval Scandinavian social norms, and rarely attested poetic forms.

By contrast, verse riddles were prominent in early medieval England, following the seminal composition of one hundred and one riddles by Aldhelm (c. 639–709), written in Latin and inspired by the fourth- or fifth-century Latin poet Symphosius. Aldhelm was followed by a number of other Anglo-Saxons writing riddles in Latin. This prestigious literary heritage contextualises the survival of nearly one hundred riddles in the tenth-century Exeter Book, one of the main surviving collections of Old English verse. The riddles in this book vary in subject matter from ribald innuendo to theological sophistication. Three, Exeter Book Riddle 35 and Riddles 40/66, are in origin translations of riddles by Aldhelm (and Riddle 35 the only Old English riddle to be attested in another manuscript besides the Exeter Book). Unlike the pithy three-line riddles of Symphosius, the Old English riddles tend to be discursive, often musing on complex processes of manufacture when describing artefacts such as mead (Exeter Book Riddle 27) or a reed-pen or -pipe (Exeter Book Riddle 60). They are noted for providing perspectives on the world which give voice to actors which tend not to appear in Old English poetry, ranging from female slaves to animals and plants. In addition, they often subvert the conventions of Old English heroic and religious poetry.

While medieval records of Germanic-language riddles are patchy, with the advent of print in the West, collections of riddles and similar kinds of questions began to be published. A large number of riddle collections were printed in the German-speaking world and, partly under German influence, in Scandinavia. Riddles were evidently hugely popular in Germany: a recent research project uncovered more than 100,000 early modern German riddles, with the most important collection being that Strassburger Rätselbuch, first published around 1500 and many times reprinted. This is one of the most famous riddles of that time:

Es kam ein Vogel federlos,
saß auf dem Baume blattlos,
da kam die Jungfer mundlos
und fraß den Vogel federlos
von dem Baume blattlos.

Translation:

There came a bird featherless
sat on the trees leafless
There came a maiden speechless
And ate the bird featherless
From off the tree leafless.

That is, "the snow (featherless bird) lies on a bare tree in winter (leafless tree), and the sun (speechless maiden) causes the snow to melt (ate the featherless bird)".

Likewise, early modern English-speakers published printed riddle collections, such as the 1598 Riddles of Heraclitus and Democritus, which includes for example the following riddle:

First I was small, and round like a pearl;
Then long and slender, as brave as an earl;
Since, like an hermit, I lived in a cell,
And now, like a rogue, in the wide world I dwell.

After the early Middle Ages, the riddle was seldom used as a literary form in English. Tellingly, while Jonathan Swift composed at least eight verse riddles on themes such as a pen, gold, and the privy, this was seen as a lapse in taste by many of his contemporaries. However, although riddles are seldom used today as a literary form in their own right, they have arguably influenced the approach to poetry of a number of twentieth-century poets, such as Francis Ponge, Wallace Stevens, Richard Wilbur, Rainer M. Rilke and Henrikas Radauskas, along with W. S. Merwin. The famed Transcendentalist Ralph Waldo Emerson once wrote "All is a riddle, and the key to a riddle ... is another riddle".

Riddles continued to flourish until recently as an oral form of entertainment, however; the seminal collection of Anglophone riddles from the early modern period through to the twentieth century is Archer Taylor's. Riddles are, for example, prominent in some early-modern ballads collected from oral tradition. Some of those included in the Child Ballads are "Riddles Wisely Expounded" (Child 1), "The Elfin Knight" (Child 2), "King John and the Bishop" (Child 45), "Captain Wedderburn's Courtship" (Child 46), and "Proud Lady Margaret" (Child 47). Contemporary English-language riddles typically use puns and double entendres for humorous effect, rather than to puzzle the butt of the joke, as in "Why is six afraid of seven?" "Because seven eight nine (eight can be replaced with ate)." These riddles are now mostly children's humour and games rather than literary compositions.

Some riddles are composed of foreign words and play on similar sounds, as in:

"There were two cats, one two three cat and un deux trois cat. They had a swimming race from England to France. Who won?"
"One two three cat, because un deux trois quatre cinq (un deux trois cat sank)."

This plays on the fact that the French words for four and five are pronounced similarly to the English words cat and sank.

==== The Celtic-speaking world ====
Few riddles are attested in medieval Celtic languages, though this depends on how narrowly a riddle is defined; some early medieval Welsh and Irish juridical texts have been read as being riddles. One undisputed riddle is attested in medieval Welsh, an elaborate text entitled 'Canu y Gwynt' ('song of the wind') in the fourteenth-century Book of Taliesin probably inspired by Latin riddles on the same theme. However, this record is supplemented by Latin material, apparently from a Brittonic cultural background in North Britain, about Lailoken: in a twelfth-century text, Lailoken poses three riddles to his captor King Meldred.

The earliest riddles attested in Irish are generally held to be found in a short collection from the fifteenth-century Book of Fermoy. However, other forms of wisdom contest do occur in Irish literature, such as The Colloquy of the Two Sages, first attested in twelfth-century manuscripts, and in one such contest, in Imthecht na Tromdaime, first attested in the fifteenth century, at least one riddle is arguably posed.

Even research on the post-medieval Celtic-speaking world has yielded a "comparatively meagre corpus".

==== The Finnic-speaking world ====
The corpus of traditional riddles from the Finnic-speaking world (including the modern Finland, Estonia, and parts of Western Russia) is fairly unitary, though eastern Finnish-speaking regions show particular influence of Russian Orthodox Christianity and Slavonic riddle culture. The Finnish for "riddle" is arvoitus (pl. arvoitukset), related to the verb arvata ("guess").

Finnic riddles are noteworthy in relation to the rest of the world's oral riddle canon for their original imagery, the abundance of sexual riddles, and the interesting collision of influences from east and west; along with the attestation in some regions of an elaborate riddle-game. Riddles provide some of the first surviving evidence for Finnish-language literature.

=== East Asia ===
==== China ====
In modern Chinese, the standard word for 'riddle' is mi (謎, literally "to bewilder"). Riddles are spoken of as having a mian (面, "surface", the question component of the riddle), and a di (底, "base", the answer component). Ancient Chinese terms for 'riddle' include yin (讔) and sou (廋), which both mean "hidden".

Literary riddles in China first begin to be attested in significant numbers around the second century CE.

The Chinese riddle-tradition makes much use of visual puns on Chinese characters. One example is the riddle "千 里 会 千 金"; these characters respectively mean 'thousand kilometre meet thousand gold'.

1. The first stage of solving the riddle is verbal:
  1. In Chinese culture, "it is said that a good horse can run thousands of kilometers per day", so "千 里" (thousand kilometer) is resolved as "马" (horse).
  2. Meanwhile, because "a daughter is very important in the family", in Chinese culture it is possible to resolve "千 金" (thousand gold) as "女" (daughter).
2. The second stage of solving the riddle is visual: combining the radical "马" (horse) with the radical "女" (daughter) produces the character "妈" (mother).

Thus the answer to "thousand kilometres meet thousand gold" is "妈" (mother).

The posing and solving of riddles has long been an important part of the Chinese Lantern Festival. China also contributed a distinctive kind of riddle known in English as the kōan (Chinese: 公案; pinyin: gōng'àn), developed as a teaching technique in Zen Buddhism in the Tang dynasty (618–907). In this tradition, the answer to the riddle is to be established through years of meditation, informed by Zen thought, as part of a process of seeking enlightenment.

In the twentieth century, thousands of riddles and similar enigmas have been collected, capitalising on the large number of homophones in Chinese. Examples of folk-riddles include:

- There is a small vessel filled with sauce, one vessel holding two different kinds. (Egg)
- Washing makes it more and more dirty; it is cleaner without washing. (Water)
- When you use it you throw it away, and when you do not use it you bring it back. (Anchor)

==== The Philippines ====
Quite similar to its English counterpart, the riddle in the Philippines is called Bugtong. It is traditionally used during a funeral wake together with other games such as tong-its or the more popular sakla; later generations use Bugtong as a form of past time or as an activity. One peculiarity of the Filipino version is the way they start with the phrase Bugtong-bugtong before saying the riddle; usually it is common to create riddles that rhyme.

This is an example of a Tagalog Bugtong:

Bugtong-bugtong, Hindi hari, hindi pari
ang suot ay sari-sari.

— Sampayan
Translation:

Riddle-riddle, not a king, nor a priest,
but dresses for a feast.

— Clothes line

Further south, in Sulawesi, Indonesia, among the Pendau, riddles are also used at funeral gatherings.

=== Africa ===
Anthropological research in Africa has produced extensive collections of riddles over the last century or so. Riddles have been characterised as "one of the most important forms of oral art in Africa"; Hamnett analyzes African riddling from an anthropological viewpoint; Yoruba riddles have enjoyed a recent monograph study. Wambi Cornelius Gulere wrote his doctoral project at Makerere University, titled Riddle Performance and Societal Discourses: Lessons from Busoga. He argues for recognition of the importance of the riddling act, not merely gathering and studying lists of riddles. Grivas Muchineripi Kayange has seen African riddles as a window into African philosophy.

=== The Americas ===
==== Native American traditions ====
Riddles in the Americas are of particular interest to scholarship because it was long thought that native American cultures had no autochthonous riddle traditions (as opposed to riddles inspired by European culture, as with the twenty-two Aztec riddles collected by Bernardino de Sahagún in the sixteenth century, in the famous Florentine codex). If so, this would have suggested that riddles are not a universal art form. Publishing the first book to anthologise native American riddles in 1992, John Bierhorst noted that

fifty years ago, it was widely believed that there were no American Indian riddles. And as recently as twenty years ago, some people were still wondering whether there were or weren't. The reason for doubt was that some of the older sources were poorly known and some of the newer ones had not yet been made available.

Indeed, Hieronymus Lalemant gave a fairly detailed account of a riddle-contest among the Huron around 1639 as part of a healing ritual.

Someone will say, "What I desire and what I am seeking is that which bears a lake within itself;" and by this is intended a pumpkin or calabash. Another will say, "What I ask for is seen in my eyes—it will be marked with various colors"; and because the same Huron word that signifies "eye" also signifies "glass bead", this is a clue to divine what he desires—namely, some kind of beads of this material, and of different colors.

Accordingly, during the twentieth century, progressively more substantial collections of Native American riddles were made. One important collection was from the Alaskan Athabaskans (Ten'a) people in British Columbia; by 2021, "of the 11 Alaska Dene-Athabascan language groups" four had "documented riddle traditions: Denaakk’e-Koyukon, Dena’ina, Upper Tanana, and (Lower) Tanana". Indigenous riddles were also documented among the Amuzgo people in Central America; and Quechua people in South America. Bierhorst's 1992 book and its bibliography afford an important survey of Indigenous American riddling. The Plains Cree elder Vern Harper commented "the thing too with Plains Cree is riddles, riddles our people used to do. We've lost a lot of that. The riddles teach you to think, to figure things out for yourself". Thus, while data remains rather thin, it seems clear that riddling did exist in the Americas independently of European culture.

==== Colonial traditions ====
Riddles are found extensively in the settler-colonial cultures of the Americas.

One form of riddle features in payada de contrapunto ("counterpoint payada"), a Rioplatense musical genre in which guitar players compete in a symbolic duel. Two guitar players challenge each other in song by asking a riddle-like question and/or answering the opponent's questions. This is performed through several successive rounds of witty exchanges which may include banter and even insults—typically with a humorous intent. The most famous literary example of counterpoint payada comes from Martín Fierro, Part 2, Song 30, verses 6233–6838.

== Riddle-contests ==
The Riddle Game is a formalized guessing game, a contest of wit and skill in which players take turns asking riddles. The player that cannot answer loses. Riddle games occur frequently in mythology and folklore as well as in popular literature.

In many cultures or contexts, people are not actually expected to guess the answers to riddles: they may be told by the riddler, or learn riddles and their answers together as they grow up. Thus riddle-contests are not the only or even necessarily the main forum for the expression of riddles.

The unsolvable riddle with which literary characters often win a riddle-contest is sometimes referred to as neck-riddle.

=== In real life ===
It seems that in ancient Greece, riddle-competitions were popular as an intellectual entertainment at symposia. A key source for this culture is Athenaeus.

Elaborate and unusual riddle-games took place in the culture of eighteenth- and nineteenth-century Finnish-language riddles. For example, Elias Lönnrot observed customary riddle-contests in nineteenth-century Finland:

It took place without teams, but was a kind of a contest: a member of the group would be sent out of the room, the others agreed on the riddle to be posed; for three failures to divine the answer, the riddlee would have to drop out of the game, to step aside, and to "buy" with a token the right to participate again.

=== In ancient, medieval, and folk literature ===
In older texts, riddle-contests frequently provide the frame stories whereby riddles have been preserved for posterity. Such contests are a subset of wisdom contests more generally. They tend to fall into two groups: testing the wisdom of a king or other aristocrat; and testing the suitability of a suitor. Correspondingly, the Aarne–Thompson classification systems catalogue two main folktale-types including riddle-contests: AT 927, Outriddling the Judge, and AT 851, The Princess Who Can Not Solve the Riddle.

=== In modern literature ===
- In J. R. R. Tolkien's novel The Hobbit, Gollum challenges Bilbo Baggins to a riddle competition for his life. Bilbo breaks "the ancient rules" of the game but is able to escape with Gollum's magic ring. Rather like in the Old Norse Heiðreks saga, although Bilbo asked more of a simple question than a riddle, by attempting to answer it rather than challenging it Gollum accepted it as a riddle; by accepting it, his loss was binding.
- In The Grey King, the third book of Susan Cooper's fantasy sequence The Dark is Rising, Will and Bran must win a riddle game in order for Bran to claim his heritage as the Pendragon.
- In Patricia A. McKillip's The Riddle-Master trilogy, the ancient art of riddlery is taught at the College of Caithnard – the study based on books recovered from the ruins of the School of Wizards. The riddles in the series are composed of three parts – the question, the answer, and the stricture – and are both a way of recording history and a guide to living life. Riddles play a crucial role in the series, the main protagonist, Morgon of Hed, beginning his journey by winning the crown of the kings of Aum in a Riddle Game with the ancient ghost of Peven of Aum; Peven had a standing wager going that no one could win a riddle-game with him, and those who lost against him forfeited their lives. "Beware the unanswered riddle."
- In Stephen King's The Dark Tower III: The Waste Lands and The Dark Tower IV: Wizard and Glass, the ka-tet must riddle against Blaine the Mono in order to save their lives. At first Blaine can answer all riddles posed to him by the ka-tet easily, but then Eddie Dean, one of the ka-tet, gains the upper hand when he starts to ask joke riddles, effectively frustrating Blaine's highly logical mind.
- In the Batman comic books, one of the hero's best known enemies is The Riddler who is personally compelled to supply clues about his upcoming crimes to his enemies in the form of riddles and puzzles. Stereotypically, they are these kinds of simple children's riddles, but modern treatments generally prefer to have the character use more sophisticated puzzles.

== See also ==
- Droodles
- Missing dollar riddle
- Newspaper riddle
- Oedipus and the Sphinx
- Rumpelstiltskin
- Riddles (Anglo-Saxon)
- Riddles (Arabic)
- Riddles (Chinese)
- Riddles (Finnic)
- Riddles (Greek)
- Riddles (Hebrew)
- Riddles (Persian)
- Riddle joke
- Charades
- Neck riddle
- Dilemma story
- As I was going to St Ives
- Enigmata Eusebii
