= Greek riddles =

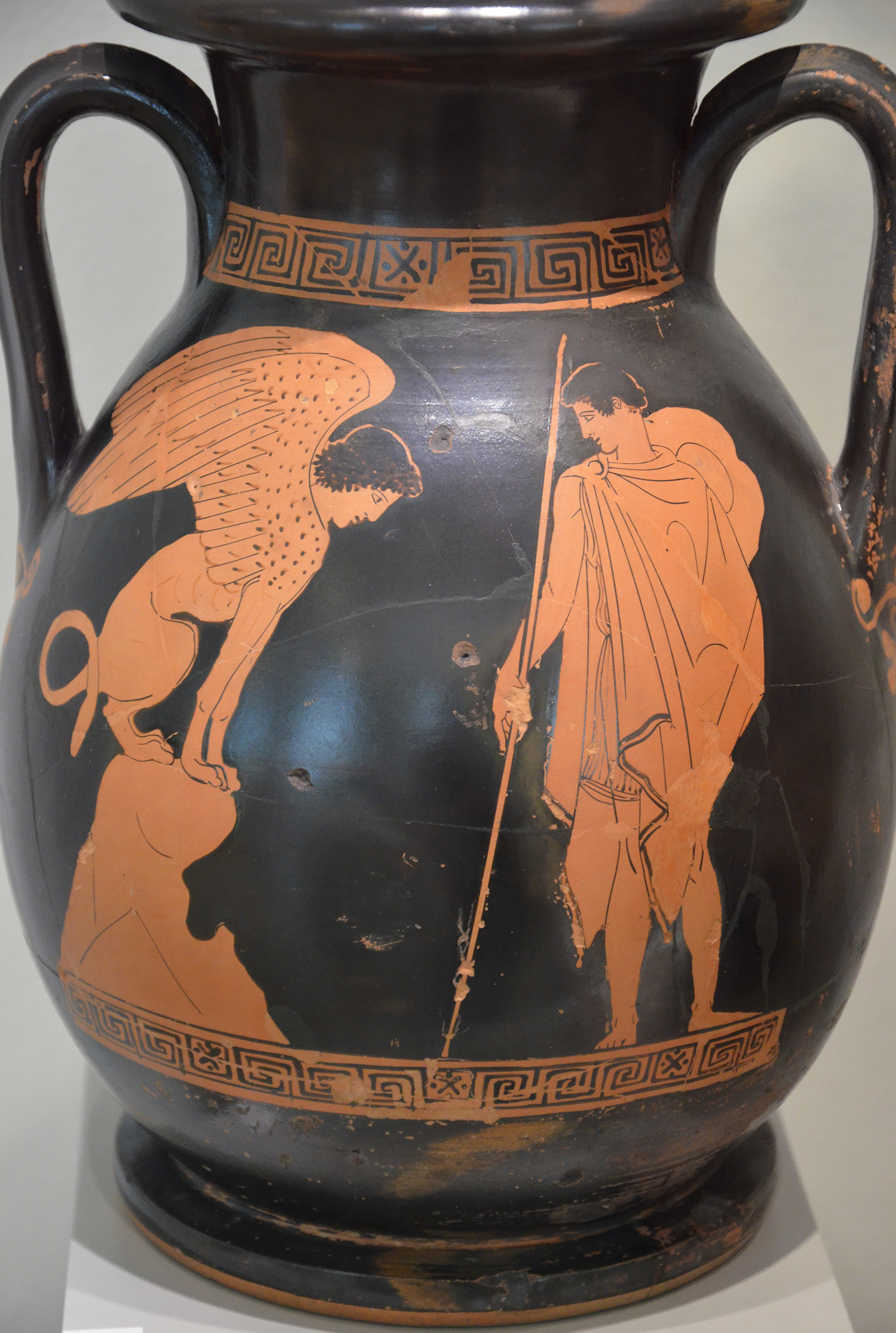
Attic red-figure pelike, Oedipus solves the riddle of the Sphinx and frees Thebes, by the Achilleus painter, 450–440 BC, Altes Museum Berlin (13718779634)

The main Ancient Greek terms for riddle are αἴνιγμα (ainigma, plural αἰνίγματα ainigmata, deriving from αἰνίσσεσθαι 'to speak allusively or obscurely', itself from αἶνος 'apologue, fable') and γρῖφος (grîphos, pl. γρῖφοι grîphoi). The two terms are often used interchangeably, though some ancient commentators tried to distinguish between them.

Riddles appear to have been a popular component of ancient symposia, and have at various points in the history of the Greek-speaking world also been a significant literary form.

== Ancient period ==
=== Sources ===
Most surviving ancient Greek riddles are in verse. Though there may already have been anthologies of riddles written down in the Hellenistic period, these do not survive. By far the largest extant collection of Antique Greek riddles is Book 14 of the Greek Anthology, as preserved in Codex Parisianus suppl. Graecus 384, which contains about 50 verse riddles. They are in a group of about 150 puzzles: the first fifty or so are oracles; the second fifty or so are arithmetical problems; and the third fifty or so riddles in the traditional sense. The date when this compilation was originally made is uncertain, and the dates of individual riddles even less clear: the oldest may go back to Archaic Greek, the youngest to Byzantine; but the emergence of the compilation in its present form is generally associated with Constantine Cephalas, working in the tenth century. Most concern everyday objects such as smoke, a fish, a mirror, wine, or pipes; the second largest group concern mythological figures, taxing the audience's knowledge of the details of their stories. It is likely that among the forerunners of the Greek Anthology, the ninth-century anthology of Cephalus contained riddles.

Allegedly, Athenaeus of Naucratis (fl. c. 200 AD) compiled a copious anthology of ancient Greek riddles citing some 1,250 authors under the title Epitome.

=== Ancient riddles and riddle-culture ===
According to Naerebout and Beerden,

In the competitive Greek societies, words were a primary locus of competition: there can be no doubt about the popularity of wordplay in the Greek world. Riddles shared in this popularity: sympotic riddles are particularly well attested--it seems there was no symposium without a fair number of riddles. The contest-riddle was a known form of riddling. So riddling pervaded Greek life on many levels and during many occasions.

A key source for this culture is Athenaeus.

The most famous Classical riddle is the Riddle of the Sphinx: Oedipus killed the Sphinx by grasping the answer to the riddle it posed. This is just one example, however, of a considerable body of riddlic oracles in Ancient Greek literature: the gods' enigmatic answers to people asking questions of oracles appears to have been a significant literary trope, amongst other things a way to warn listeners of the perils and difficulties of seeking divine guidance. Heraclitus's enigmatic style overlaps to some extent with riddles, and indeed he told one story of Homer being presented with the following riddle by some boys: "What we have caught and what we have killed we have left behind, but what has escaped us we bring with us". (The answer is "lice".) Although Plato reports that ancient Greek children did indeed engage in riddle play (Republic 479c), he also recognized the important function that riddles can play in showing what cannot literally be said about ultimate truths (Letters, book 2, 312d). Aristotle considered riddles important enough to include discussion of their use in his Rhetoric. He describes the close relationship between riddles and metaphors: "Good riddles do, in general, provide us with satisfactory metaphors; for metaphors imply riddles, and therefore a good riddle can furnish a good metaphor". Aristotle is not known to have composed riddles, but 'among his pseudepigrapha there apparently was a collection of metaphorical, riddle-like phrases and expressions', now lost.

Some of the riddles in the Greek Anthology may date back to the ancient period. The following, for example, is an example of the widespread year-riddle attributed to Cleobulus (fl. C6 BCE):

There is one father and twelve children; of these each
Has twice thirty daughters of different appearance:
Some are white to look at and the others black in turn;
They are immortal and yet they all fade away.

(The answer is the year and its days and nights.)

Other examples from the Greek Anthology, as translated by E. S. Forster, include:

My mother I bring forth, she brings forth me:
I'm sometimes greater, sometimes less than she. (xiv.41)

I look at you whene'er you look at me;

You see but I see not; no sight have I;
I speak but have no voice; your voice is heard;

My lips can only open uselessly. (xiv.56)

One wind there is: ten sailors row amain
Two vessels, and one steersman steers the twain. (xiv.14)

I am a black child sprung from a bright sire,

A wingless bird, fleeting to heaven from earth.
Each eye that meets me weeps, but not from grief,

And in thin air I vanish at my birth. (xiv.5)

A blackened lump am I-and fire begat me:

My mother was a tree on mountain steep.
I save from wounds the chariot of the sea,

If my sire melts me in a vessel deep. (xiv.61)

The answer are: night and day; a reflection in a mirror; double flute played by one person with ten fingers; smoke; pitch, used for caulking ships.

The last of Greece's known literary non-Christian riddle-masters is the Emperor Julian.

== Byzantine period ==
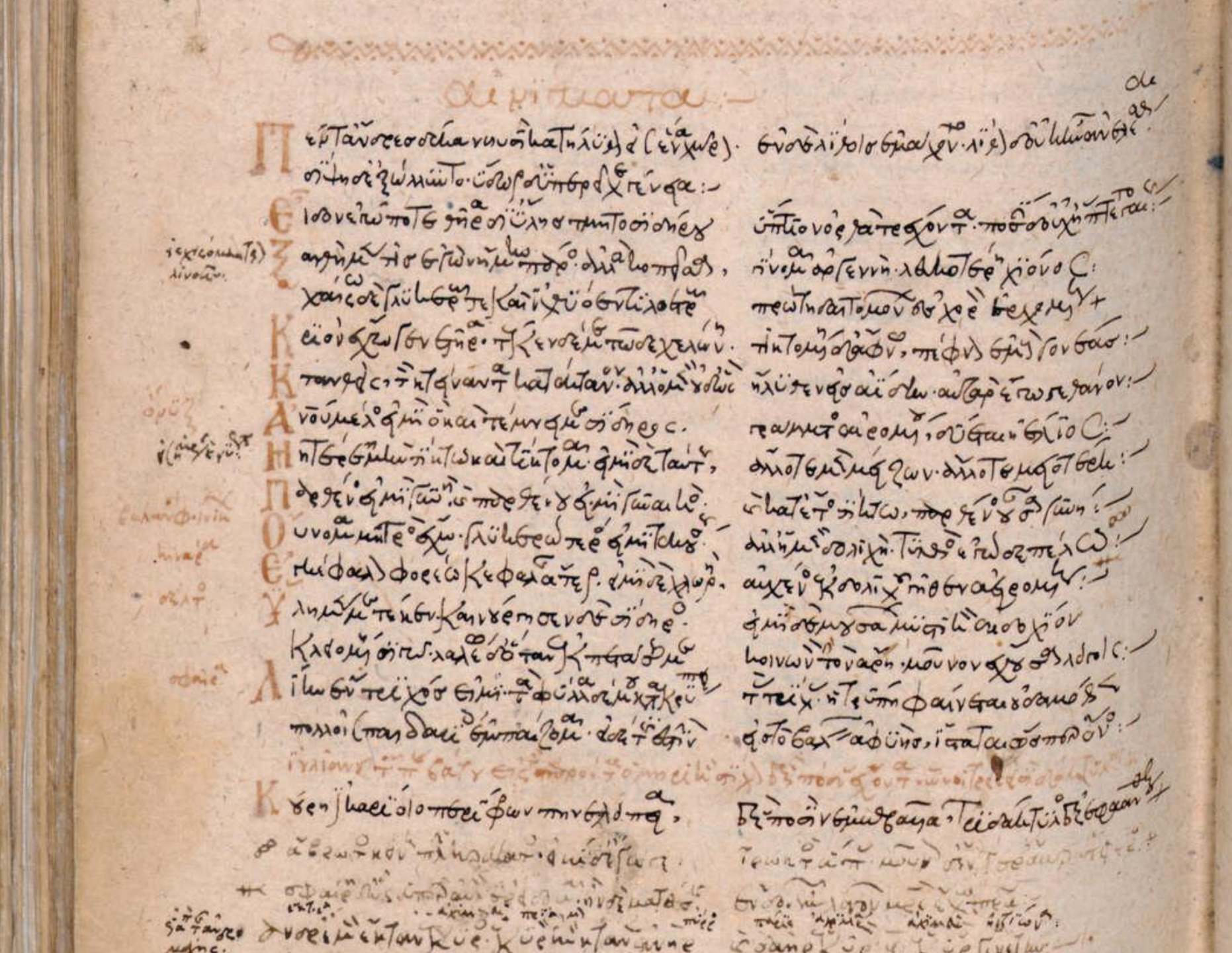
Greek riddles copied by the Byzantine monk Maximus Planudes in the last two decades of the thirteenth century in Florence, Biblioteca Medicea Laurenziana, Plutei 32.16, f. 382v.

Literary riddles were also composed in Byzantium, from perhaps the tenth century with the work of John Geometres, into the fifteenth century, along with a neo-Byzantine revival in around the early eighteenth century. There was a particular peak around the long twelfth century: Christopher of Mytilene's στίχοι διάφοροι ('Various Verses') contain riddles, while John Mauropous, Michael Psellos, Basilios Megalomites, Theodore Prodromos, Eustathios Makrembolites, and Manuel Moschopoulos were all part of this movement. In form,

Byzantine riddles differ from classical ones more in terms of metre than in terms of subject-matter. [...] The structure of the riddle is basically the same. Most often a riddle is built around a paradoxical or ironical antithesis. The subject nearly always speaks of itself in the first person (in a personified form). Its speech usually begins with an explanation of its origins, provenance, birth, etc., in terms like: 'my mother was such-and-such, my father is so-and-so', or 'without my mother's help my father has given birth to me' (a very popular formula). At the end of its speech the subject will occasionally address the reader and dare him to use his brains and find the correct answer.

In the Byzantine period, riddles were often copied by scribes into marginal or spare space in manuscripts.

=== Forms and subjects ===
The main edition of Byzantine riddles, by Čelica Milovanović, covers 214 of about 300 known riddles. Milovanović divides the corpus into the following genres, and identifies riddles on the following subjects (alongside 29 without a known solution [nos. 186-214]; the lists below give the numbers of each riddle in her edition).

==== True riddles (nos. 1–80) ====
An example of one of the true riddles is this, on a writing tablet: 'Wood gave birth to me and iron reformed me, and I am the mystic receptacle of the Muses. When shut I am silent, but I speak when you unfold me. Ares alone is the confidant of my conversation', where Ares is not only the name of a god, but a poetic term for a stylus.

Acrobat 41 (?)42; Adam 1 2; alphabet 3; antidote 55; St Anne 4; angel 5; artichoke 6; baptism in the Jordan (?)29; bag 36; bird and egg 56; book 25; book (letter) 26; Cain and Abel (?)23; Christ and the Mother of God (?)7; Christ and the Samaritan Woman (?)75; clapper 24; cuttlefish 63; day and night (?)11; echo 22; Eve 15 16; female 17; fire 9, 18; fishermen and fish 59; funeral 68; gold 19; hawk 21; ink 34; Jacob's struggle with the angel (?)8; the prophet Jonah 53 54; king in a dungeon 27; lie 32; light 61; Lot's wife 16'; man (?)77 78; mill (?)37; mind 73 (?)74; the miracle of Moses on the Red Sea 79; month 35; musical instrument 38; Noah's Ark 39; olive 33; parchment 44; Penelope 43; pitcher 28; rainbow 13; rooster 45 46 47; salt 65 (?)66 67; scales 71; shadow 62; ship 30 (?)31; sleep 60; smoke 12; snail 57 57'; snow 64; soul (?)14; spider 40; sponge 69; stylus 48 49 (?)50 51; time 10; three boys in a fiery furnace (?)72; truth 20; the word of God (?)58; writing 52; writing tablets 70.

==== Letter riddles (nos. 81–144) ====
Byzantine riddles include many whose solution is arrived at through clues based on spelling. In some cases, this involves subtracting a letter from a word. Thus a riddle attributed to Basilos Megalomites says 'A tiny animal, I am not edible; my name consists of three letters only; should you take away the first of my letters, I'd be a large one, and ready for eating'. The answer is both μυς ('mouse') and υς ('hog').

Accent, stress 111; the prophet Amos 118; animals 93; apple 97; arrow 81; the Beginning 117; bread 143; breath 87; candle 128 129; dance 132; Delos 88; envy 95; Eros 91 92; eunuch (?)90; foot 112; fortification 141 (?)142; gate 102; goat 104; golden beekeeper 119; grass 137; hand 123; hard 136; hours 76; John the Baptist 100 101; joy 120 121; light 125 126 (?)127; lips/vagina 140; madness 107; mind 138 139; mockery 122; mouse 108 109; nail 113; neck 85; oak 144; only child 98; ox 83; pig 130; pillar 134; rope 105; rooster 115; sail 99; sand 113'; St Sava 124; seed 131; snow 133; soul 89; sparrowhawk 103; spring, well 96; sun 135; tent 80; thief 106; torrent 82; water 84; wool 86; weevil 94.

==== Questions and answers (Nos. 145–185) ====
Alongside folk-riddles and literary riddles, Byzantine riddles also include question-and-answer riddles whose form is not sophisticated, but whose content tests knowledge of the Bible. This corpus is attested from the early fifth century onwards. One example of the form runs 'Who upon dying was not buried, and yet was not stinking? The wife of Lot, fleeing from Sodom, became a pillar of salt and is standing to this day'.

Adam 171 182; Adam and Eve 152 161; baptism in the Jordan 184; body and soul 151 177; Cain and Abel 158; Christ and the Virgin 150; Christ and the Thieves 165; Christ and the Samaritan 164; Christ and Salome 172; clapper 168; death 163; earth and sky 148; Eve 170; fish in the sea 167; flood 146; grain and mill 169; St Helen and the Holy Cross 160; John the Baptist 159; John the Baptist and Christ 149; the prophet Jonah 176; Judas and the Rooster 147; Lot's wife 173; meeting of the Mother of God and Elizabeth 180; the miracle of Moses on the Red Sea 157; month 153; Noah's Ark 162 185; Peter, Adam and David 156; saliva 116; shrimp 110; song 114; sea 166; sleep 181; soul 179; suffering of Christ 155; Tobit 145; truth 174; twelve months 178; the Virgin 154; world (cosmos) 175; year 183.

== Modern Greek ==
A key collection of modern Greek riddles is N. G. Polites, 'Demode Ainigmata', in Neohellenika Analekta, I (Athens, 1870), 193–256.

== Influence ==
It is likely that Greek riddles were among the influences on the seventh- to eighth-century Anglo-Latin poet Aldhelm.

== Editions and translations ==
- Beta, Simone, 'An Enigmatic Literature: Interpreting an Unedited Collection of Byzantine Riddles in a Manuscript of Cardinal Bessarion (Marcianus Graecus 512)', Dumbarton Oaks Papers, 68 (2014), 211-240
- Beckby, H. 1968. Anthologia Graeca, vol. 4, 2nd edn (Munich: Heimeran)
- Buffière, F. 1970. Anthologie grecque, pt. 1: Anthologie Palatine, vol. 12: books 13-15 (Paris: Les Belles Lettres)
- Cougny, E. 1890. Epigrammatum Anthologia Palatina cum Planudeis et appendice nova epigrammatum veterum ex libris et marmoribus ductorum, vol. 3 (Paris: Firmin-Didot), pp. 563–78 (a collection of riddles supplementary to the Palatine Anthology)
- Schulz, W. 1909–12. Rätsel aus dem hellenischen Kulturkeise, Mythologische Bibliothek, 3, 5, vols 1-2 (Leipzig: Hinrichs)
- Βυζαντινα αινιγματα: Византијске загонетке [Byzantina aenigmata: Vizantijske zagonetke]/Βυζαντινα αινιγματα: Les Énigmes Byzantines, ed. and trans. [into Serbian] by Челица Миловановић/Čelica Milovanović, Српска академија наука и уметности, Одељење језика и књижевности, Балканске народне умотворине [Odeljenje jezika i knjizevnosti. Balkanske narodne umotvorine]/Académie Serbe des Sciences et des Arts, Classe de language et de littérature, Littérature orale des Balkans, 6 (Belgrade: Српска академија наука и уметности/Srpska akademija nauka i umetnosti, 1986), ISBN 86-7025-096-9 (the main edition of Byzantine riddles, covering 214 of about 300 known riddles)

Six riddles from the Palatine Anthology are available in English translation in Palatine Anthology, trans. by W. R. Paton, Loeb Library, 5 vols (Cambridge, MA, 1916–18).

=== Manuscript facsimiles ===
- Florence, Biblioteca Medicea Laurenziana, Plutei 32.16, f. 382v. (riddles compiled by Maximus Planudes between 1280 and 1283, overlapping with those in Book 14 of the Palatine Anthology.

== Major studies ==
- Berra, Aurélien, 2012, 'Théorie et pratique de l’énigme en Grèce ancienne' (unpublished Ph.D. thesis, Ecole des Hautes Etudes en Sciences Sociales)
- Luz, Christine, 2010, Technopaignia, Formspiele in der griechischen Dichtung, Mnemosyne Supplements, 324 (Leiden: Brill)
- Ohlert, Konrad, 1886, Rätsel und Rätselspiele der alten Griechen (Berlin: Mayer & Müller)
- Schneider, Luisa, 2020, Untersuchungen zu antiken griechischen Rätseln, Beiträge zur Altertumskunde, 371, 2 vols (Berlin: De Gruyter), ISBN 9783110674743
