= Vidagdhamukhamaṇḍana =

Sanskrit poetry collection

The Vidagdha-mukha-maṇḍana ('Adornment for the Mouth of the Intelligent') is a Sanskrit poetry collection of, in most editions, 272 verses in four books (containing 59, 69, 73, and 71 riddles and puzzles, with the third book focusing on visual puzzles). It is the largest collection of Indian riddles from before 1000.

== Origins and contents ==
The work was composed by one Dharmadāsa or Dharmadāsasūri, about whom almost nothing further is, however, known; some manuscripts have him as a Buddhist, though there is also a tradition that he was a Jain. The work quotes and therefore post-dates the probably seventh-century Bāṇabhaṭṭa, and is quoted by and therefore predates eleventh-century works. The work discusses the literary theory of riddles and then presents a large number of arcane riddles, mostly in Sanskrit but sometimes in different Prākrits. In the assessment of Ludwik Sternbach, 'they are ... intelligence tests for Pandita-s who must be well versed in mythology, grammar, phonetics, mathematics, rhetorics, poetics, etc.'

== Editions and translations ==
- Kávya-sangraha: A Sanscrit Anthology, Being a Collection of the Best of the Smaller Poems in the Sanscrit Language, ed. by John Haeberlin (Calcutta: Thacker, 1847) [repr. 1872 and 1888]
- Vidagha Mukha Mandana, or The Ornament of the Mouth of Learned with Notes and Explanations in Sanskrit, ed. by Harisas Hirachand, Kávyakalápa, 3 (Bombay: Hirachand, 1865).
- Vidagha-mukhamaṇḍanam-nāma prahelikā-kāvyaṃ śrī-Durgācaraṇa viracitayā vyākhyayālaṅkṛtam (Bahrāmpor: Rādhā-ramaṇa, 1887)
- Dharmadāsa, The Vidagdhamukhamandana: An Ancient Sanskrit Poetical Composition, ed. by C. A. Silakkhandha Thera, trans. [into Sinhalese] by C. A. Seelakkandha Thera (Colombo: Kalupahana, 1902).
- Das Vidagdhamukhamandana des Dharmadāsa: Ein Lehrbuch der Rätselkunde. 1. und 2. Kapitel, ed. and trans. by Martin Kraatz, 2 vols (Marburg: Lahn, 1968). [This also includes a fuller bibliography of earlier editions, II 212.]
- Dharmadāsasūri, Vidagdhamukhamaṇḍanam. Candrakala-vyākhyayā hindı̄bhāṣānuvādena ca vibhūṣitam dharmadāsasūri-kṛtam. Sampādako vyākhyākāraśca Śeṣarājaśarmā (Varanasi: Caukhambha Orientalia, 1984).
- Digitized manuscript facsimile
