= Neck riddle =

Hero victorious through unsolvable riddle

The neck riddle is a riddle where the riddler (typically a hero in a folk tale) gains something with the help of an unsolvable riddle. Verlyn Flieger (citing Williamson, Archer Taylor and Hilda Ellis Davidson) defines neck riddles as "questions that are unanswerable except by the asker, who thus saves his neck by the riddle, for the judge or executioner has promised release in exchange for a riddle that cannot be guessed".

The name comes from the folk tales of type "Out-riddling the judge" (Aarne–Thompson classification system for folk tales #927), when the hero "saves his neck" (that is, avoids being sentenced to a death by hanging) after outwitting a judge with riddles.

== Examples ==
Neck riddles include Bilbo Baggins's final riddle to Gollum in The Hobbit ("What have I got in my pocket?") and Óðinn's final riddles to Vafþrúðnir in the Old Norse poem Vafþrúðnismál and to King Heiðrekr in the Gátur Gestumblinda in Heiðreks saga ("What did Óðinn whisper in Baldr's ear before Baldr was cremated?").

== Literary function ==
In the assessment of Roger D. Abrahams, neck riddles

are not riddles but reportings of riddling situations in a dramatic context. They function in contexts of this sort not as riddles, but as devices which heighten dramatic tension and lead to a satisfying dramatic resolution. The answers cannot be decipherable to the audience because if they could be figured out, the narrative movement would be destroyed. But this is not true of most riddles which are descriptive and create a poetic image. [...] The neck-saving story commonly involves a confrontation with death by the protagonist. The story turns on how to convert Death into Life; and the theme of the riddles in nearly all cases turns on descriptions of oblique situations in which Life emerges phoenix-like from Death.
