= Exeter Book Riddle 51 =

Old English riddle

Exeter Book Riddle 51 (according to the numbering of the Anglo-Saxon Poetic Records) is one of the Old English riddles found in the later tenth-century Exeter Book. Its solution is 'quill pen and three fingers', 'whose figurative "journey" leaves a dark track of letters and words on the page' and it stands accordingly as an important literary example of the international riddle type, the Writing-riddle, whose most basic form is 'white field, black seeds'. In the reading of Helen Price, the riddle suggests that 'writing is a journey, but it is not one of a human being alone. The riddle is self consciously aware of the connected nature of human, tool, and animal'.

== Text ==
Ic seah wrætlice wuhte feower
samed siþian; swearte wæran lastas,
swaþu swiþe blacu. Swift wæs on fore,
fuglum framra; fleag on lyfte,
deaf under yþe. Dreag unstille
winnende wiga se him wegas tæcneþ
ofer fæted gold feower eallum.

Translation:

I saw four wondrous things
travelling together; their tracks were swarthy,
their footsteps were very black. It was swift on its journey,
bolder than the birds; it flew across the air,
dove under the water. Busy was the
struggling warrior, who showed all four
of them the way over plated gold.

== Studies ==
- Lees, Clare A. 2010. ‘Basil Bunting, Briggflatts, Lindisfarne, and Anglo-Saxon Interlace’, in Anglo-Saxon Culture and the Modern Imagination, ed. by David Clark and Nicholas Perkins, Medievalism, 1 (Cambridge: Brewer), pp. 111–28.

== Editions ==
- Foys, Martin et al. (eds.) Old English Poetry in Facsimile Project, (Madison, WI: Center for the History of Print and Digital Culture, 2019-). Online edition annotated and linked to digital facsimile, with a modern translation.

== Recordings ==
- Michael D. C. Drout, 'Riddle 51', performed from the Anglo-Saxon Poetic Records edition (29 October 2007).
