= Writing-riddle =

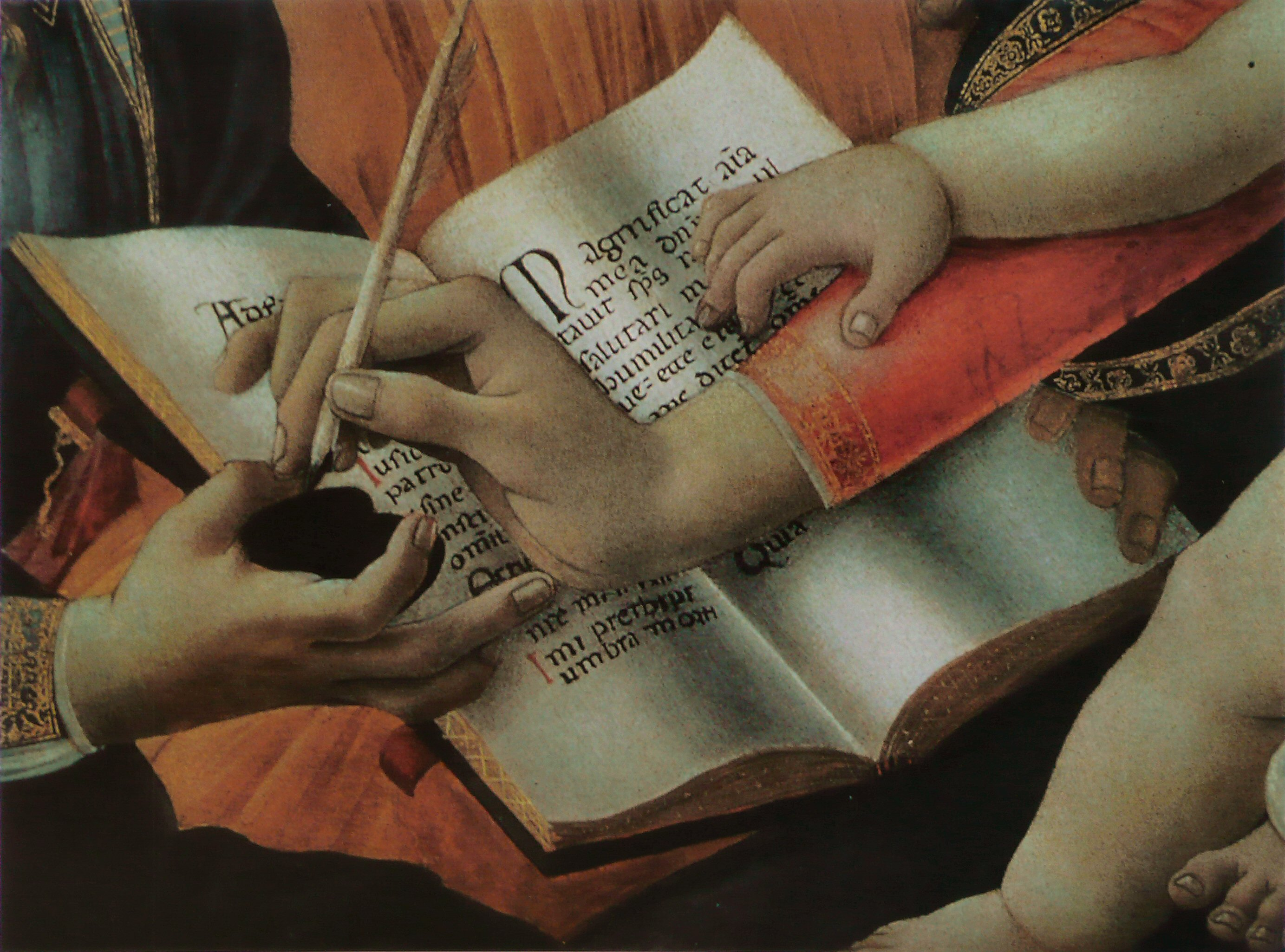
Sandro Botticelli - Madonna del Magnificat

The writing-riddle is an international riddle type, attested across Europe and Asia. Its most basic form was defined by Antti Aarne as 'white field, black seeds', where the field is a page and the seeds are letters. However, this form admits of variations very diverse in length and degree of detail. For example, a version from Astrakhan translates as "the enclosure is white, the sheep are black", while one from the Don Kalmyks appears as "a black dog runs on white snow", and literary riddlers especially have produced long variations on the theme, often overlapping with riddles on pens and other writing equipment.

== Significance ==
Literary riddles have been particularly prized by scholars for the insights they give into how past writers have conceptualised the act of writing.

== Anglo-Saxon examples ==
One of the Old English riddles of the Exeter book is a variations on the writing-riddle: Exeter Book Riddle 51. Earlier and more frequent examples appear among Anglo-Latin riddles, however, as follows.

=== Aldhelm, c. C7, ‘De pugullarbius’ (‘on wax tablets’) ===
Melligeris apibus mea prima processit origo.
Sed pars exterior crescebat caetera silus;
Calciamenta mihi tradebant tergora dura;
Nunc ferri stimulus faciem proscindit amoenam
Flexibus et sulcos obliquat ad instar aratri;
Sed semen segetis de caelo ducitur almum
Quod largos generat millena fruge maniplos
Heu tam sancta seges diris extinguitur armis.

My inner part came from honey-bearing bees,
But my outer part grew in the woods;
Hard hides supplied my shoes.
Now a goad of iron cuts my pleasant face;
In the likeness of a plough, it bends the furrows with its curving motions.
But from heaven comes the nourishing seed for the harvest,
Which brings forth generous sheaves in a thousandfold fruit.
Alas that such a holy crop is destroyed by harsh weapons!

=== Aldhelm (c. C6), ‘De penna scriptoris’ (‘On the writer’s quill’) ===
Me dudum genuit candens onocratulus albam
Gutture qui patulo sorbet de gurgite limphas.
Pergo per albentes directo tramite campos
Candentique uiae uestigia cerula linquo
Lucida nigratis fuscans anfractibus arua.
Nec satis est unam per campos pandere callem
Semita quin potius milleno tramite tendit
Quae non errantes ad caeli culmina uexit.

I am shining white, born long ago of the gleaming pelican,
Who takes the waters of the sea into his open mouth.
Now I travel a narrow path over white-glowing fields;
I leave cerulean footprints along the shining way,
Obscuring the bright fields with my blackened windings.
It is not enough for me to open one pathway through the fields;
Rather, the road runs its course in a thousand byways
And leads those who stray not to the heights of heaven.

=== Tatwine (C8), Enigma 5, 'De membrano' ('on parchment') ===
Efferus exuviis populator me spoliavit,
Vitalis pariter flatus spiramina dempsit;
In planum me iterum campum sed verterat auctor.
Frugiferos cultor sulcos mox irrigat undis;
Omnigenam nardi messem mea prata rependunt,
Qua sanis victum et lesis praestabo medelam.

A savage ravager robbed me of my clothing,
and likewise deprived my pores of the breath of life;
but a craftsman turned me into a level plain again.
A cultivator soon irrigates fertile furrows with waves;
my meadows render a harvest of balsam of every kind,
with which I will supply nourishment to the healthy and healing to the sick.

== Romance examples ==
The writing riddle was very popular in the Romance languages, and indeed arguably the first attestation of a language written in Romance rather than Latin is the eighth- or ninth-century Veronese Riddle:

Se pareba boves
alba pratalia araba
albo versorio teneba
negro semen seminaba

In front of him (he) led oxen
White fields (he) ploughed
A white plough (he) held
A black seed (he) sowed.

Here, the oxen are the scribe's finger(s) and thumb, and the plough is the pen. Among literary riddles, riddles on the pen and other writing equipment are particularly widespread.

This French version is attested in a fifteenth-century manuscript:

Blanc est le champ,
noire est la semence,
l'omme qui le semme,
est de tresgrant science.

White is the field,
black is the seed,
the man who sows it
is of very great knowledge.

And these versions are attested in the French creole of Mauritius:

Latére blanc, lagrains noir?
─Papier sembe lécriture

Lamain sémé, liziés récolté?
─Crire av lire

Blanc napas capave travaille sans noir?
─Plime bisoin lenque

The earth is white, the seed black?
─Paper and writing

The hand sows, the eyes reap?
─Writing and reading

The white cannot work without the black?
─ A pen needs ink

== Pen riddles ==
Pen riddles are to a greater or lesser extent allied to the traditional writing riddle. Examples of pure pen-riddles include the Old English Exeter Book Riddle 60, two by the tenth-century Hebrew-language poet Dunash ben Labrat, and others follow.

=== Palatine Anthology (Greek) ===
I was a reed, a useless plant; for from me is born neither fig nor apple nor grape; but a man initiated me into the ways of Helicon, having shaped fine edges and having carved out a narrow channel. From then, should I drink black liquid, as if inspired, with this dumb mouth I utter every kind of word.

=== Symphosius (c. C4) 'Harundo' ('reed') (Latin) ===
Dulcis amica ripae, semper uicina profundis,
Suaue cano Musis; nigro perfusa colore,
Nuntia sum linguae digitis signata magistris.

Sweet darling of the banks, always close to the depths, sweetly I
sing for the Muses; when drenched with black, I am the tongue’s
messenger by guiding fingers pressed.

This poem adverts to the use of reeds for making pipes as well as pens.

=== Al-Harīrī of Basra (1054–1122) ('reed-pen') (Arabic) ===
One split in his head it is, through whom ‘the writ’ is known, as honoured recording angels take their pride in him;
When given a drink he craves for more, as though athirst, and settles to rest when thirstiness takes hold of him;
And scatters tears about him when he bids him run, but tears that sparkle with the brightness of a smile.

=== Al-Ibshīhī (1388-1448) ('pen') (Arabic) ===
وَذي نُحولٍ راكع ساجدٍ أعْمى بصيرٍ دَمْعُهُ جاري
مُلازِم الخَمْسِ لَأَوقاتها مجتهِد في طاعة الباري

I recall somebody scrawny, bowing down, putting his forehead on the ground, blind but discerning—his tears flowing,
He keeps to the five (prayers) in their appointed times and exerts himself in obeying the Creator (/the sharpener).

=== Judah Halevi (Hebrew) ===
What's slender, smooth and fine,
and speaks with power while dumb,
in utter silence kills,
and spews the blood of lambs?
