= Year-riddle =

Riddle spread in the cultures of Eurasia

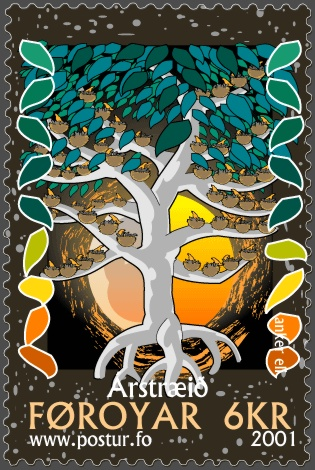
Faroese stamp visualising the year-riddle.

The year-riddle is one of the most widespread, and apparently most ancient, international riddle-types in Eurasia. This type of riddle is first attested in Vedic tradition thought to originate in the second millennium BCE.

== Research ==
Studies have surveyed the exceptionally wide attestation of this riddle type. The riddle is conventionally thought to be eastern in origin, though this may simply reflect the early date of writing in the east. A variety of guiding metaphors appear in the Year-riddle, and it can be helpful to analyse its variants on these lines. It has been argued that 'versions usually express the conventional tropes of a given culture or society and indicate regional sources'.

Year-riddles are numbered 984, 1037 and 1038 in Archer Taylor's English Riddles from Oral Tradition. As a folktale motif, the riddle is motif H721 in the classificatory system established by Stith Thompson's Motif-Index of Folk-Literature.

== Examples ==
Most year-riddles are guided by one (or more) of four metaphors: wheels, trees, animals (particularly human families), and artefacts (particularly architecture).

The first three all make an appearance in the year-riddle that appears in several versions of the Tale of Ahikar. This story seems to have originated in Aramaic around the late seventh or early sixth century BCE. The relevant passage is lost from the earliest surviving versions, but the following instance, from a later Syriac version, is thought likely to represent the early form of the text:

[The king] said to me, “Aḥiḳar, expound to me this riddle: A pillar has on its head twelve cedars; in every cedar there are thirty wheels, and in every wheel two cables, one white and one black.” And I answered and said to him, “(...) The pillar of which thou hast spoken to me is the year: the twelve cedars are the twelve months of the year; the thirty wheels are the thirty days of the month; the two cables, one white and one black, are the day and the night.

=== Wheels and wheeled vehicles ===
Ancient Indian sources afford the earliest attestations of the year-riddle: examples in the Rigveda are thought to originate c. 1500×1200 BCE. Their use of metaphors of wheels reflects the prominence of the concept of the wheel of time in Asian culture.

Hymn 164 of the first book of the Rigveda can be understood to comprise a series of riddles or enigmas. Many are now obscure, but may have been an enigmatic exposition of the pravargya ritual. Rigveda 1.164.11 runs:

Devanagari

दवादशारं नहि तज्जराय
वर्वर्ति चक्रं परि दयां रतस्य
आ पुत्रा अग्ने मिथुनासो अत्र
सप्त शतानि विंशतिश्च तस्थु

Latin transliteration

duvā^{́}daśāraṃ nahí táj járāya
várvarti cakrám pári dyā^{́}m r̥tásya
ā^{́} putrā^{́} agne mithunā^{́}so átra
saptá śatā^{́}ni viṃśatíś ca tasthuḥ

Modern English translation

With twelve spokes—for it does not become old—
the wheel of the truthful order turns on and on around the sky.
Sons, in pairs, o Agni,
seven hundred and twenty, are standing.

Meanwhile, 1.164.48 gives:

Devanagari

दवादश परधयश्चक्रमेकं
तरीणि नभ्यानि क उ तच्चिकेत
तस्मिन साकं तरिशता न शङकवो.
अर्पिताः षष्टिर्न चलाचलासः

Latin transliteration

duvā^{́}daśa pradháyaś cakrám ékaṃ
trī^{́}ṇi nábhyāni ká u tác ciketa
tásmin sākáṃ · triśatā^{́} ná śaṅkávo
arpitā^{́}ḥ ṣaṣṭír ná calācalā^{́}saḥ

Modern English translation

The felly-pieces are twelve, the wheel is one,
the nave-pieces three; who has understood this?
On it are placed, as it were, 360
pegs that do not wobble.

Likewise, in the Mahabharata, the riddles posed to Ashtavakra by King Janaka in the third book begin with the year-riddle: what has six naves, twelve axles, twenty-four joints, and three hundred and sixty spokes?

A later Indic example using a similar metaphor is from the riddles ascribed to Amir Khusrau (1253–1325):

Baarah ghodey, tees garaari
Teen-sau-pachpan chali savaari
Garmi, sardi, aandhi aavey,
kabhu rukay na, chalte jaavey.

Translation:

Twelve horses, thirty pullers,
Passengers, three hundred and fifty-five
Come summer, winter or storm,
Never stop—always mobile.

Here the three hundred and fifty-five days of the year correspond to the twelve lunar cycles of the Islamic calendar year.

=== Trees and other plants ===
A large number of variants (numbered 1037-38 in Archer Taylor's English Riddles from Oral Tradition) compare the year to a tree; indeed, 'riddlers rarely use the scene of a tree and its branches for other subjects than the year and the months or the sun and its rays'. The tree is also the metaphor usually found in Arabic folktales. The popularity of tree-imagery is thought to echo the widespread popularity of trees as a metaphor for the world or life in Eurasian traditions.

Most year-riddles of this kind can be thought of as containing some or all of the following components:

code	component	alternative component	solution
A	the tree		year
B	twelve branches		months
C	fifty-two flowers	four nests	weeks/seasons
D	365 or 366 leaves	seven eggs	days of year/week
E	three or six eggs		Christmas, Easter, and Pentecost (one or two days each)
F	twenty-four young birds		hours
G	their sixty steps		minutes

Versions containing only parts of the tree occur across Eurasia, whereas the versions with the nests occur only in Europe.

Examples include this verse from the early eleventh-century Shahnameh:

What are the dozen cypresses erect
In all their bravery and loveliness,
Each one of them with thirty boughs bedeckt--
In Persia never more and never less?.

To which Zāl responds

First as to those twelve cypresses which rear
Themselves, with thirty boughs upon each tree:
They are the twelve new moons of every year,
Like new-made monarchs, throned in majesty.
Upon the thirtieth day its course is done
For each; thus our revolving periods run.

Later examples include:

číst ʔan xús dærǽxte sǽbz neqáb
šaxháyæš duwazdǽ ʔæn bæ hesáb
tu gǽr ʔæz rúye ʔáqil béšmarì
sí bæhǽr šàx bærg pɪndari
sál.

Translation:

What is that good tree, green-veiled,
Its branches are twelve in number,
If you count from the face of intelligence,
Thirty leaves on every branch you will find.
Year

Yonder stands a tree of honor,
twelve limbs grow upon her,
every limb a different name.
It would take a wise man to tell you the same. [English]

A tree with twelve branches and thirty leaves, of which fifteen are black and fifteen white, strewn with open flowers of whitish yellow [Malay]

There stands a tree with twelve branches, on each branch are four nests, in each nest are six young, and the seventh is the mother. [Lithuanian]

More elaborate variations on this theme are also found. One Icelandic example is preserved in three early-modern manuscripts of the riddle-contest in the medieval Heiðreks saga and runs: Hvert er það þingið sem er með tólf blómstrum en í hvorju blómstri eru fjögur hreiður? En í hverju hreiður eru sjö fuglar og er sitt nafn sér. Hverjum getið? Tólf mánuðir, sex vikur, sjö dagar ('what is that assembly which has twelve flowers, and in each flower are four nests? And in each nest are seven birds and each has its own name? How are they guessed? 12 months, 4 weeks, 7 days').

=== Animals ===
==== Human families ====
Human families provide a guiding metaphor for a number of year riddles (numbered 984 in Archer Taylor's English Riddles from Oral Tradition), though almost never in English-language tradition. Although only first attested in the roughly tenth-century CE Greek Anthology, the following Greek riddle is there ascribed to Cleobulus (fl. C6 BCE); even if it is not that ancient, the attribution to him would suggest that the riddle was thought of in Ancient Greek culture as itself being very old:

Εἶς ὁ πατήρ, παῖδες δυοκαίδεκα· τῶν δὲ ἑκάστῳ
παῖδες <δὶς> τριήκοντα διάνδιχα εἶδος ἔχουσαι·
αἱ μὲν λευκαὶ ἔασιν ἰδεῖν, αἱ δ᾽ αὖτε μέλαιναι·
ἀθάνατοι δέ τ᾽ ἐοῦσαι, ἀποφθινύθουσιν ἅπασαι

Translation:

There is one father and twelve children; of these each
Has twice thirty daughters of different appearance:
Some are white to look at and the others black in turn;
They are immortal and yet they all fade away.

Another example of the family metaphor is this French riddle, first published in 1811:

Nous sommes douze sœurs, filles d'un même père,
Pas toujours d'une même mère.
Chacune successivement
Enfante quatre mâles,
Qui produisent pareillement,
A distances égales
Plus de trois cents filles par jour,
Chacune à son tour.
Ceux-la naissent de leurs femelles;
Nous en naissons aussi bien qu'elles;
Ils nous forment, nous les formons,
Après quoi nous recommençons.

Translation:

We are twelve sisters, daughters of the same father,
Not always of the same mother.
Each one successively
Gives birth to four males,
Who produce similarly,
At equal intervals
More than three hundred daughters a day,
Each in his turn.
Those male ones are born from their females;
We are born just as those female ones are;
The male ones form us, we form them,
After which we start again.

The only English-language example of this kind of year-riddle found by Taylor was from Saba Island in the Antilles: 'A fader had twelve sons, de second one de younges'. — 'Twelve months of the year, de second one February'.

==== Other animals ====
Eastern Europe and Asia exhibit a range of other animal metaphors for the year, usually involving a team of twelve oxen pulling one plough or gatherings of different species of birds.

=== Artefacts ===
A number of year-riddles use man-made objects as their controlling metaphor. For example, a modern Greek riddle invokes a cask made with twelve staves, and a Parsi riddle the contents of a chest. But most often these riddles draw on architecture, as in the following mid-twentieth-century example from central Myanmar:

Ein-daw-thar-lan:

set-nhit khan:
ta khan: thone gyait
ah phay eit
phwiṇ hlet ta gar:
lay: paut htar:
win bu twet bu bar yẹ lar:

Hnit

It is a beautiful house with twelve rooms and thirty people can sleep in each room. There are four doors left open. Have you ever passed through these doors?
A year.
