= I. M. Dharmadasa =

- Occupations: Professor, writer
- Known for: Inventor of a new thin film photovoltaic device and method of making the same
- Title: Emeritus Professor

Academic background
- Education: University of Peradeniya
- Thesis: Electrical properties of cadmium telluride and associated devices (1980)
- Doctoral advisor: Sir Gareth Roberts

Academic work
- Discipline: Applied Physics
- Sub-discipline: electronic materials, renewable energy
- Institutions: Sheffield Hallam University
- Main interests: solar cells and semiconductor devices

I. M. Dharmadasa is a Professor of Applied Physics and leads the electronic materials and solar energy (solar cells and other semiconductor devices) group at Sheffield Hallam University, UK. Dharme has worked in semiconductor research since becoming a PhD student at Durham University as a Commonwealth Scholar in 1977, under the supervision of the late Sir Gareth Roberts. His interest in the electrodeposition of thin film solar cells grew when he joined the Apollo Project at BP Solar in 1988. He continued this area of research by joining Sheffield Hallam University in 1990.

== Career and research ==
He has published over 200 refereed and conference papers, has six British patents on thin film solar cells and has made over 175 conference presentations. He has made five book contributions and is the author of the book Advances in Thin Film Solar cells, which was published in 2012. Dharmadasa has also successfully supervised 20 Ph.D. and M.Phil. candidates and 14 years of postdoctoral research associate support. He has gained research council and international government funding, and was included in the 2001 Research Assessment Exercise for Metallurgy and Materials which gained the top rating of five.

His recent scientific breakthroughs, which are fundamental to describing the photovoltaic activity of cadmium telluride/cadmium sulfide solar cells, were summarised in a "new theoretical model for CdTe". Based on these novel ideas he has reported a higher efficiency of 18% for cadmium telluride/cadmium sulfide cell, compared with 16.5% reported by NREL in the United States in 2002. He currently focuses on low-cost methods to develop thin film solar cells based on electrodeposited copper indium gallium selenide materials, where he has reported efficiencies of 15.9% to date, compared with the highest value of 19.5% reported by NREL using more expensive techniques. His article 'Fermi level pinning and effects on CuInGaSe2-based thin-film solar cells' was selected to be part of the Semiconductor Science and Technology Journal's Highlights of 2009.

== Social contribution ==
In addition to his research and development programme, Dharmadasa is heavily involved in and passionate about promoting the use of renewable energy for the alleviation of poverty and economic development. He was one of the founding members of the which is now becoming an international programme for the promotion of renewables. As a Sri Lankan from a rural village in the Kurunagala District, he has taken back his knowledge to his village, recently setting up machinery to provide several local villages with free drinking water by replacing an expensive diesel pump with a solar powered motor. He extend this concept through his "Village Power" programme by setting up solar powered energy hubs in developing countries with the hope of empowering rural communities to grow and develop through education and commerce. Back home in the UK, he regularly gives guest lectures at secondary schools around Sheffield, with the hope of instilling the importance of renewable energy technologies in the minds of young students.

== Early career ==
Earlier in his career, Dharmadasa graduated from the University of Peradeniya in Sri Lanka by completing two B.Sc. Honours degrees covering chemistry, physics and mathematics. He won the Dr. Hewavitharana Memorial Prize for best performance for his physics special degree in 1975, and joined the academic staff of the Physics Department in the Science Faculty at the University of Peradeniya. After winning an open commonwealth scholarship in 1977, he completed his Ph.D. thesis in 1980, under the supervision of the late Sir Gareth Roberts and M. Petty, at the University of Durham (UK), before returning to his post in Sri Lanka. A deep research interest generated by his Ph.D. thesis led to his return to the UK in 1984, where he was an active solar energy researcher at the University College Cardiff and the British Petroleum Company, before joining Sheffield Hallam University in 1990.

== Professional affiliations ==
Dharmadasa is a fellow of the World Innovation Foundation and the UK Institute of Physics. He referees for over 12 international journals and currently serves as assessor/panel member for the UK funding council, Department of Trade and Industry, The European Commission, the British Council (BC) and the Commonwealth Scholarship Commission. Dharmadasa holds dual citizenship (Sri Lankan and British) and is currently advising several Government Ministries on using renewable energy as a tool for social development and the empowerment of rural communities. Dharmadasa is one of the founding members of the Association of Professional Sri-Lankans UK, and has served as a vice president for five years and its president for two years (2009-2011).

== Selected works ==
=== Books ===
- Ojo, A. A.; Cranton, W. M.; Dharmadasa, I. M. (August 2018). Next Generation Multilayer Graded Bandgap Solar Cells. Springer. ISBN 978-3-319-96667-0.
- Dharmadasa, I. M. (September 2012). Advances in Thin-Film Solar Cells. CRC Press. ISBN 978-981-4316-07-1.

=== Papers ===
- Dharmadasa, I. M. (1 January 1998). "Recent developments and progress on electrical contacts to CdTe, CdS and ZnSe with special reference to BARRIER contacts to CdTe". Progress in Crystal Growth and Characterization of Materials. 36 (4): 249–290. doi:10.1016/S0960-8974(98)00010-2. ISSN 0960-8974.
- Emery, K.; Dharmadasa, I. M.; Chaure, N. B.; Young, J.; Samantilleke, A. P.; Delsol, T. (August 2003). "Comment on 'New Ways of Developing Glass/ Conducting Glass/ CdS/CdTe Metal Thin-Film Solar Cells Bases on a New Model' by Dharmadasa et al 2002 Semicond. Sci. Technol. 17 1238-48". Semiconductor Science and Technology. 18 (8): 812–816. doi:10.1088/0268-1242/18/8/401. ISSN 0268-1242.
- Dharmadasa, I. M.; Alam, A. E.; Ojo, A. A.; Echendu, O. K. (1 December 2019). "Scientific complications and controversies noted in the field of CdS/CdTe thin film solar cells and the way forward for further development". Journal of Materials Science: Materials in Electronics. 30 (23): 20330–20344. doi:10.1007/s10854-019-02422-6. ISSN 1573-482X.
- I.M. Dharmadasa, Solar Energy for a Healthy Society, Part I, Lanka Outlook, Winter (1997/98), pp. 36–37.
- I.M. Dharmadasa, Solar Energy for a Healthy Society, Part II, Lanka Outlook, Spring (1998), pp. 36–38.

=== Patents ===
- UK Expired GB2397944A, I.M. Dharmadasa, N.B. Chaure, A.P. Samantilleke, John Young, "Thin film photovoltaic device and method of making the same", published 2004-04-21, issued 2004-12-22, assigned to Sheffield Hallam University
