= Robert Petsch =

August Ferdinand Robert Petsch (born Berlin 4 June 1875, died Hamburg 10 September 1945) was a German researcher of Germanic culture and folklore.

== Life and work ==
Petsch studied in Berlin with Erich Schmidt and at the University of Würzburg, where he received his doctorate in 1898 on "Volksrätsel" ('the traditional riddle') and completed his habilitation in 1900 on "Formelhafte Schlüsse im Volksmärchen" ('formulaic endings in folk-tales'). He belonged to the pioneering Berlin school of Germanic studies associated with Wilhelm Scherer. In 1914 he held a lectureship in Liverpool. Then he was appointed full professor at the Königliche Akademie zu Posen — German Academy in Poznán. When Germany lost Poznán through the Treaty of Versailles, Petsch lost his job.

In October 1919, Petsch became a professor at the University of Hamburg, taking up the first chair of modern German literary history, and he taught beyond retirement age until 1945. He was a founding figure there in Allgemeine Literaturwissenschaft ('general literary study'), which moved away from focusing on history and authorial biography in favour studying the nature, typology and form of literature. Petsch dealt intensively with the work of Gotthold Ephraim Lessing and Goethe, in particular accruing 32 publications on Goethe's Faust. In 1924 he was a co-founder of the Hamburg Goethe Society. In the field of folklore he focused on fairy tales.

Petsch joined the Nazi Party in 1933, the year they came to power, and was in November 1933 one of the signatories of the professors' commitment to Adolf Hitler at German universities and colleges. In 1937, Petsch argued that Nordic poetry of the "echt germanischen Form" ('genuinely Germanic form') was particularly close to German literature. He viewed Selma Lagerlöf, Sigrid Undset, and Knut Hamsun as poets fitting the Germanic tradition who wrote in "artgemäßen Denkbahnen" ('species-appropriate ways of thinking'), by contrast with German writers like Alfred Döblin and Thomas Mann, whom Petsch saw as decadent. For Petsch, Hamsun in particular was the greatest Nordic storyteller, as one of the "wärmsten Bewunderern und Verteidigern" ('warmest admirers and defenders') of Nazi Germany abroad.

Among Petsch's students were Paul Böckmann and Fritz Martini. Because of his early membership of the Nazi Party, Petsch was suspended by the British occupation authorities at the age of almost 70 in May 1945, dying a few months later.

== Key works ==
- Freiheit und Notwendigkeit in Schillers Dramen (= Goethe- und Schillerstudien. 1, ZDB-ID 531596-7). Beck, München 1905.
- Lessings Briefwechsel mit Mendelssohn und Nicolai über das Trauerspiel. Nebst verwandten Schriften Nicolais und Mendelssohns (= Philosophische Bibliothek. Bd. 121, ISSN 2365-2861). Dürr, Leipzig 1910.
- Gehalt und Form. Gesammelte Abhandlungen zur Literaturwissenschaft und zur allgemeinen Geistesgeschichte (= Hamburgische Texte und Untersuchungen zur deutschen Philologie. Reihe 2: Untersuchungen. 1, ZDB-ID 530928-1). Ruhfus, Dortmund 1925.
- Wesen und Formen der Erzählkunst (= Deutsche Vierteljahrsschrift für Literaturwissenschaft und Geistesgeschichte. Buchreihe. 20, ZDB-ID 200380-6). Niemeyer, Halle (Saale) 1934.
- As editor, with Hermann Blumenthal: Goethes Werke. 12 Bände. Kleine Festausgabe. Bibliographisches Institut, Leipzig 1938.
