= Ludwik Sternbach =

Ludwik Sternbach (12 December 1909 – 25 March 1981) was a lawyer, United Nations officer, and Indologist.

== Early life ==
Sternbach was born in the Polish city of Kraków to Jewish parents: the lawyer Dr Edward Sternbach and his wife Clara (née Amster).

Sternbach studied Sanskrit in parallel to training as a lawyer. In 1927 he matriculated at the Jagiellonian University in Kraków, graduating as a magister juris in 1931. He proceeded to take an LL.D. in 1933, and also qualified in commercial law and statistics. From 1936 to 1939 he practiced law as an advocate, and on account of his prodigious linguistic skills was the official court's translator for Spanish, Italian, German, French, and English.

Meanwhile, he studied Sanskrit with Professor Helena Willman-Grabowska in the Jagiellonian University's seminar for Sanskritology and Indian Philology, beginning in 1928 and graduating with an M.Ph. in Sanskrit and Indology. He also worked as Grabowska's assistant while practicing as a lawyer.

== Second World War ==
The Nazi occupation of Western Poland led the Jewish Sternbach to flee to Lwów in the east of the country, where he joined the University of Jan Kazimierz Oriental Institute as a lecturer in ancient Indian culture, under Professor Stefan Stasiak. The Russian occupation of Eastern Poland led to the Soviet authorities cancelling Sternbach's position, and in 1941 he fled, along with his parents and his research notes, travelling through Turkey, Iran, and Afghanistan, to Karachi and thence to Bombay. The Polish embassy there helped Sternbach find work in the Indian Army's Indian Censorship Organisation, where he worked in a civilian capacity from 1941 to 1945.

While in India, Sternbach came to the notice of Prefessor R. N. Dandekar and Dr K. M. Munshi, which led to Sternbach receiving the position of honorary professor at the Bharatiya Vidya Bhavan and a teacher at the University of Bombay in 1944. He visited and gave academic papers in Panjab, Andhra, Annamalai, Mysore and Utkal, amongst others, and undertook research at the Kerala University Research Institute and the Manuscripts Library in Trivandrum.

== Post-war career ==
Sternbach left India in 1946. In 1947, he began working for the United Nations, beginning in its Department of Trusteeship and Non-Self-Governing Territories, and retiring from a position as its Deputy Director of Research in 1969. He became Professor of Hindu Law and Indology at the University of Paris (1970–72) and the Collège de France, Paris (1972–76). In 1976, he retired again, but remained active in academia: he was secretary general of the International Association of Sanskrit Studies and of the World Sanskrit Conference from their foundation until his death, and a member of the Institute of Indian Civilization of the Collège de France.

Sternbach was the honorand of one Festschrift in 1979 (and which contains further biographical information), and, following his death, another in 1981.

== Works ==
A complete list of Sternbach's publications up to that time appears in his 1979 Festschrift. Sternbach's books include:

- Supplement to O. Böhtlingk's Indische Sprüche (Wiesbaden: Deutsche Morgenländische Gesellschaft/Kommissionsverlag Franz Steiner, 1965).
- A new Cāṇakya-Rāja-Nīti-Śāstra manuscript (Bombay: Bhāratiya Vidyā Bhavan, 1958).
- The Mānava dharmaśāstra, I-III and the Bhaviṣya Purāṇa (Varanasi: All India Kashi Raj Trust, 1974).
- The spreading of Cāṇakya's aphorisms over "Greater India" (Calcutta: Calcutta Oriental Book Agency, 1969).
- Bibliography of Kauṭilīya Arthaśāstra (Hoshiarpur: Vishveshvaranand Institute, 1973).
- [Mahā-subhāṣita-saṅgraha] = Mahā-subhāṣita-saṁgraha: being an extensive collection of wise sayings in Sanskrit, critically edited with introduction, English translation, critical notes, etc., 3 vols (Hoshiarpur : Vishveshvaranand Vedic Research Institute, 1974–77).
- A descriptive catalogue of poets quoted in Sanskrit anthologies and inscriptions (Wiesbaden: Harrassowitz, 1978–80).
- Subhāṣita, gnomic and didactic literature (Wiesbaden : O. Harrassowitz, 1974).
- Poésie sanskrite dans les anthologies et les inscriptions (Paris: Collège de France, Institut de civilisation indienne/Diffusion, E. de Boccard, 1980–1985).
- The Kāvya-portions in the Kathā-literature (Pañcatantra, Hitopadeśa, Vikramacarita, Vetālapañcaviṁśatikā, and Sukasaptati); an analysis (Delhi: Meharchand Lachhmandas, [1971-1976])
- The Hitopadeśa and its sources (New Haven: American Oriental Society, 1960)
- With Varanasi Kauṭalya, A new abridged version of the Bṛhaspati-saṁhitā of the Garuḋa Purāṇa (Purāṅ Dept.: All-India Kashiraj Trust, 1966).
- Vyāsasubhāṣitasaṅgrahaḥ: Luḍvhik Ṣṭerṇabākh ityetaiḥ anekamātṛkādhāreṇa pāṭhāntarādibhiḥ saṃśodhya idamprathamatayā sampāditaḥ (Vārāṇasī: Caukhambā Saṃskṛta Sīrīja Āphisa, 1969)
- Canakya's aphorisms in the Hitopadesá (I-IV), American Oriental Society. Publications. Offprint series, 28 (New Haven: American Oriental Society, 1956–57).
- Gaṇikā-vr̥tta-saṅgrahaḥ, or, Texts on courtezans in classical Sanskrit (Hośyārapure: Viśveśvarānandasaṃsthāna-prakāśanamaṇḍalam, [1953])
- Indian riddles: a forgotten chapter in the history of Sanskrit literature (Hoshiarpur: Vishveshvaranand Vedic Research Institute, 1975).
- Bibliography on dharma and artha in ancient and mediaeval India (Wiesbaden: Harrassowitz, 1973).
- With Kauṭalya, The subhāsita-samgraha-s as treasuries of Cānakya's sayings (Hoshiarpur: Vishveshvaranand Institute, 1966).
- Cāṇakya-nīti-text-tradition = [Cāṇakya-nīti-śākhā-samprad āyah] (Hoshiarpur: Vishveshvaranand Vedic Research Institute, 1963-)
- Aphorisms and proverbs in the Kathā-sarit-sāgara (Lucknow: Akhila Bharatiya Sanskrit Parishad, 1980-).
- With Kauṭalya, Cāṇakya-rāja-nīti: maxims on Rāja-nīti / compiled from various collections of maxims attributed to C[sup]-aṇakya (Adyar, Madras, India: The Adyar Library and Research Centre, 1963).
- The subhāsita-samgraha-s as treasuries of Cānakya's sayings (Hoshiarpur: Vishveshvaranand Institute, 1966).
- Unknown verses attributed to Kṣemendra (Lucknow: Akhila Bharatiya Sanskrit Parishad, 1979).
- Traduction et commentaire de l'homélie écrite probablement par Théodore le Syncelle sur le siège de Constantinople en 626 / Ferenc Makk; avec une préface de S. Szádeczky-Kardoss; appendice, Analecta Avarica de L. Sternbach (Szeged: JATE, 1975).
