= John Geometres =

Byzantine poet

John Geometres or Kyriotes (Greek: Ιωάννης Γεωμέτρης/Κυριώτης, fl. 2nd half of 10th century), was a Byzantine poet, soldier, and monk. He is one of the main literary figures of the Macedonian Renaissance.

== Biography and work ==
John was probably of noble descent, but other relatives have not been identified. He was well educated and served in the Byzantine army before retiring as a monk. His career encompassed the eventful reigns of Nikephoros II Phokas (r. 963–969), John I Tzimiskes (r. 969–976) and the early years of Basil II (r. 976–1025). As a result, his poetry is full of references to the contemporary Byzantine conflicts with the Bulgarians and the Rus', as well as the rebellions of Bardas Skleros and Bardas Phokas. Among the Byzantine emperors, he singles out Nikephoros II Phokas for particular praise, while he denigrates his murderer and successor John Tzimiskes. He was previously erroneously identified with another John, Bishop of Melitene.

John Geometres wrote both in verse and in prose. His works include epigrams, including a collection on monasticism called Paradeisos ("Paradise"), hymns to the Virgin Mary, an encomium to an oak tree, as well as prose works on rhetoric, oratory and exegesis.

== Editions ==
The first edition of his poems was published by John Antony Cramer in 1841, based on the 13th-century Paris. suppl. gr. 352 manuscript, but his edition contained many errors. A revised edition with a translation in French was published by Émilie Marlène van Opstall in 2008. An edition and English translation of Geometres's prose Life of the Virgin Mary was published by Maximos Constas and Christos Simelidis in 2023.

== Sources ==
- Kazhdan, Alexander (1991). "John Geometres". In Kazhdan, Alexander (ed.). The Oxford Dictionary of Byzantium. New York and Oxford: Oxford University Press. p. 1059. ISBN 978-0-19-504652-6.
- Vasiliev, A. A. (1958). History of the Byzantine Empire, 324–1453, Volume I. THe University of Wisconsin Press. ISBN 9780299809256.
