= Riddles of Amir Khusrow =

Indian riddles

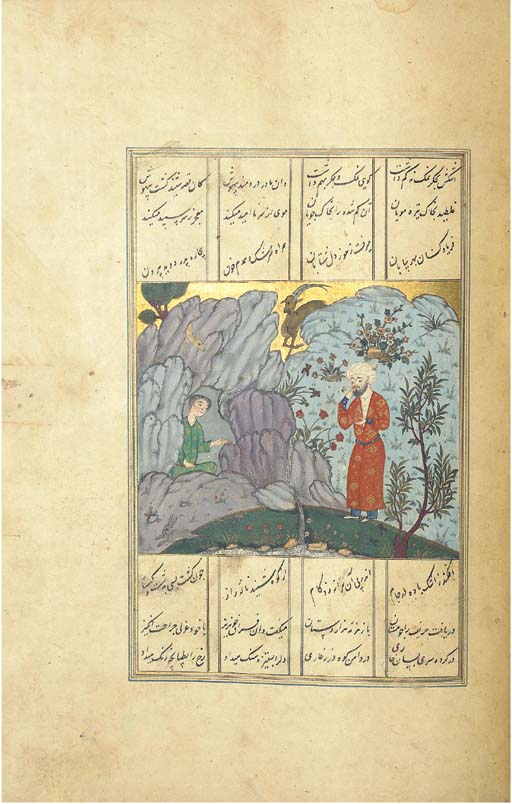
An illustrated manuscript of one of Amir Khusrau's poems.

A page of Amir Khusrow's riddles

The Riddles of Amir Khusrow were developed during the royal courts of more than seven rulers of the Delhi Sultanate. During this time, Khusrow wrote not only many playful riddles, but songs and legends which have been a part of popular culture in South Asia ever since. Additionally, his riddles and songs and legends are considered to be an important early witness to the Hindustani language. His riddles in particular involve fun double entendre, or wordplay. Innumerable riddles by this poet are being passed through oral tradition for the past seven centuries with a notable increase in recent times. However, there is some debate about whether Khusrow was the real author of the riddles attributed to him; some riddles transmitted under his name concern subjects which did not exist in Khusrow's own time, such as the gun and hookah.

The collection contains 286 riddles, divided into six groups, 'apparently on the basis of the structure of the riddle and the structure of the answer'; 'these riddles are "in the style of the common people", but most scholars believe they were composed by Khusro'. The riddles are in Mātrika metre.

== Examples ==
Some of the most notable riddles of Khusrow are —

1. One trickster performed this trick, Inserted a (green) parrot into the cage; Oh, what an act the sorcerer shows, Puts in green, takes out red ! Ans. Paan (Betel leaf)

2. A screen inside, a screen outside, a pounding heart in between, Says Amir Khusrau, its moving inch by inch. Ans. Qaynchi (Scissors)

3. He found some beautiful, sparkling pearls, and gave them to me to keep, But alas, I can't find them now where I kept, Have searched every corner, even in the bazaar; What to do, Oh my friend? What will I give, when the beloved asks? Ans. Olay (Hailstone)

4. Sometimes I see a woman, She peeps in and then disappears. I get amazed – How can water contain such fire in it? (Note the double meaning of the word naar - in Hindavi, a woman and in Persian/Arabic: fire) Ans. Bijli (Lightning)

5. This fellow is beautiful like an idol, whoever sees him, looks like him; Haven't understood this riddle, am guessing but can't figure out. Ans. Aayina (Mirror)

6. All dressed up colourfully, a little shy; but a rain without the season, This is what baffles me, what makes her cry on a happy day? Ans. Dulhan (Bride)

== Editions and translations ==
- Amir Khusrau Dehlavi, Jawahar-i-Khusravi, ed. by Rashid Ahmad Salim (Aligarh: Majmua-i-Rasail Institute Press, 1917).
- Brajratna Das, Khusro kī Hindī Kavitā (Kashi, 1922)
- Gopi Chand Narang, Amir Khusrau ka Hindavi Kalam (Delhi: Photo Offset Printer, 1987)
- In the Bazaar of Love: The Selected Poetry of Amīr Khusrau, trans. by Paul E. Losensky and Sunil Sharma (New Delhi: Penguin, 2011), pp. 114-16 (nos 74–78)
- Ankit Chadha, Amir Khusrau: The Man in Riddles (Gurgaon: Penguin, 2016) (popular adaptation of twenty riddles for children)
