= Mātrika metre =

Mātrika metre is a quantitative system of poetic metre in Indo-Aryan languages. Mātrika metre's are based on units of prosodic time (mātrā) rather than groups of syllabes, vārnika metres.

The unit of measurement is the mātrā, or beat, from which it takes its name. A short vowel or a pause is counted as one mātrā, and long vowels, diphthongs, or a short vowel followed by a consonant cluster counts as two mātrās. In recitation, however, long vowels may be pronounced as short, or short as long, in order to fit the words into the desired metre. For this reason, the mātrā count does not always correspond exactly to the written vowel arrangement. Different mātrika metres have different rules determining caesurae; most require a specific pattern of rhyme.

The most popular of these metres in Hindi are the chaupāī (sixteen mātrās), the chaupaī (fifteen mātrās), and the dohā (thirteen mātrās in the first and third feet and eleven, along with end-rhyme in the second and fourth).

== See also ==
- Sanskrit prosody
