= Antti Aarne =

Finnish folklorist (1867–1925)

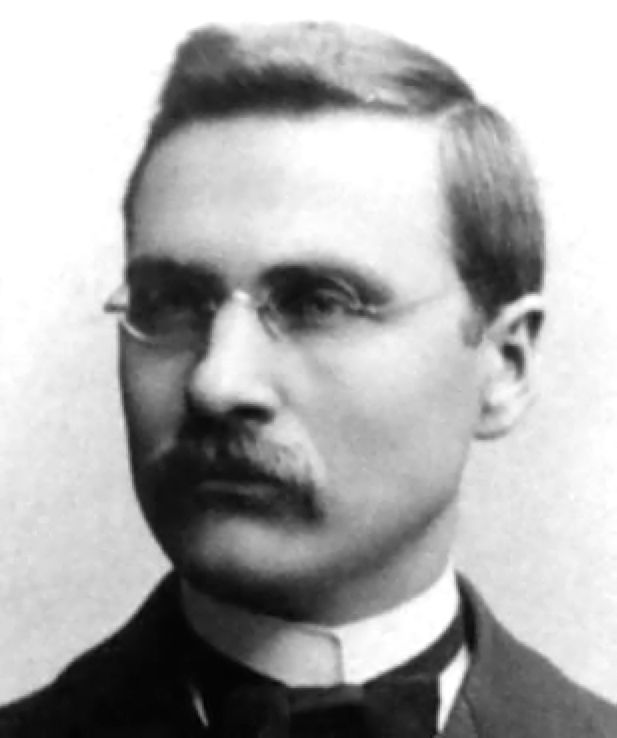
- Born: Antti Amatus Aarne; 5 December 1867; Pori, Grand Duchy of Finland
- Died: 2 February 1925 (aged 57); Helsinki, Finland
- Occupation: Folklorist
- Employer: University of Helsinki
- Known for: Aarne-Thompson classification system

Antti Amatus Aarne (5 December 1867 – 2 February 1925) was a Finnish folklorist.

== Background ==
Aarne was a student of Kaarle Krohn, the son of the folklorist Julius Krohn.

He further developed their historic-geographic method of comparative folkloristics, and the initial version of what became the Aarne–Thompson classification system of classifying folktales, first published in 1910 and extended by Stith Thompson first in 1927 and again in 1961.

Early in February 1925, Aarne died in Helsinki where he had been a lecturer at the University since 1911 and where he had held a position as Professor extraordinarius since 1922.
