= Archer Taylor =

American folklorist (1890–1973)

Archer Taylor (August 1, 1890 – September 30, 1973) was one of America's "foremost specialists in American and European folklore", with a special interest in cultural history, literature, proverbs, riddles and bibliography.

== Early life and education ==
Taylor was born in Philadelphia, Pennsylvania, on August 1, 1890.

He enrolled at Swarthmore College in Pennsylvania, graduating with a B.A. and M.A. in German.

He then taught German at Pennsylvania State College. He went on to Harvard University, receiving his Ph.D. degree in German in 1915 with a dissertation on the fairy tale motifs in the Wolfdietrich epics. At Harvard, he studied under such famous scholars as Kuno Francke, George Lyman Kittredge, John Albrecht Walz, Hans Carl Gunther von Jagemann, William Henry Schofield, Charles Hall Grandgent, and F.N. Robinson. From them he developed interest in such fields as German literature, Germanic philology, Scandinavian studies, Romance languages, Celtic and, folklore in general.

Taylor also spent two summers studying abroad: at the University of Freiburg (Breisgau) in 1913 and at the University of Helsingfors (under Kaarle Krohn) in 1925.

== St. Louis, Chicago ==
In 1915 Taylor began teaching German at Washington University in St. Louis, eventually being promoted to professor.

He moved to the University of Chicago in 1925. By 1927 Taylor had become the Chairman of the Department of Germanic Languages and Literatures.

He married his childhood sweetheart Alice Jones on September 9, 1915, and they had three children. He lost her June 16, 1930, while they lived in Chicago. He later married Dr. Hasseltine Byrd, who became his second wife on June 17, 1932. They had two children. Like her husband, Dr. Hasseltine Byrd Taylor also taught for many years at the University of California Berkeley.

== Berkeley, California ==
In 1939, they moved to California, where he served as Professor of German Literature and Folklore at the University of California at Berkeley, as Chairman of the Department from 1940 to 1945. While in California, they built a home in the Napa Valley, where they hosted many folklorists. While in California, he worked as a journal editor, for California Folklore Quarterly (which he helped found) (now Western Folklore) and the Journal of American Folklore. In 1965, Archer worked with his Finnish friend Matti Kuusi to establish the journal Proverbium.

== Retirement ==
Taylor retired in 1958 but continued to be intellectually active and productive, spending periods as visiting professor at the "University of Texas (1959), Indiana University (1958 and 1962) and Ohio State University (1963)" and continuing to publish books.

He died on September 30, 1973, in Vallejo, California.

== Legacy ==
His publications were numerous, included work in medieval literature, philology, folklore, bibliography, etc., eventually totalling over four hundred books, monographs, articles and notes in America and Europe. His most famous work was The Proverb (1931), which contains his most famous quote, "the definition of a proverb is too difficult to repay the undertaking... An incommunicable quality tells us this sentence is proverbial and that is not".

Though Taylor's contribution to the studies of proverbs is better known, his contribution to the studies of riddles is also significant. "Archer Taylor ... among modern folklorists has contributed most to riddle scholarship."

== Honors ==
Taylor received honorary doctorate of law degree from the University of California and was appointed a senator of the University of Giessen in Germany. He was a Guggenheim Fellowship in 1927 and again in 1960, was elected to the American Academy of Arts and Sciences in 1949, was elected a Member of the American Philosophical Society and president of the Modern Language Association in 1951, and was president of the American Folklore Society 1936–38.

In 1960 Taylor was honored by a Festschrift, Humaniora: Essays in Literature, Folklore, Bibliography: Honoring Archer Taylor on His Seventieth Birthday, edited by his friends Wayland D. Hand and Gustave O. Arlt. At the annual meetings of the Western States Folklore Society, which he helped found, there is an invited lecture in the Archer Taylor Lecture Series.

== Bibliography ==
=== Folklore, proverbs and riddles ===
- The Black Ox: A Study in the History of a Folk-Tale, Helsinki: Suomalainen Tiedeakatemia, 1927.
- "Edward" and "Sven i Rosengard": A Study in The Dissemination of a Ballad, University of Chicago Press, 1931.
- The Proverb, Cambridge, Massachusetts: Harvard University Press, 1931.
- An Index to "The Proverb", Helsinki: Suomalainen tiedakatemia, Academia scientiarum fennica, 1934.
- A Bibliography of Meistergesang, Bloomington, Indiana: Indiana University Press, 1936. Joint author: Frances H. Ellis.
- The Literary History of Meistergesang, New York: Modern Language Association of America, 1937.
- A Bibliography of Riddles, Helsinki, Suomalainen Tiedeakatemia - Academia Scientiarum Fennica, 1939.
- Problems in German Literary History of the Fifteenth and Sixteenth Centuries, New York, Modern Language Association of America, 1939.
- The Literary Riddle before 1600, Berkeley and Los Angeles: University of California Press, 1948.
- English Riddles from Oral Tradition, Berkeley and Los Angeles: University of California Press, 1951.
- Proverbial Comparisons and Similes from California, Berkeley, Los Angeles: University of California Press, 1954.
- A Collection of Irish Riddles, Berkeley: University of California Press, 1955. Joint editor: Vernam Hull.
- The Shanghai Gesture, Helsinki: Suomalainen Tiedeakatemia - Academia Scientiarum Fennica, 1956.
- Selected Writings on Proverbs, Helsinki: Suomalainen Tiedeakatemia - Academia Scientiarum Fennica, 1975.

=== Bibliography and book history ===
- Renaissance Reference Books: A Checklist of Some Bibliographies Published before 1700, Berkeley, Los Angeles: University of California Press, 1941.
- Printing and Progress: Two Lectures, Berkeley, Los Angeles: University of California Press, 1941. Joint author: Gustave O. Arlt.
- Renaissance Guides to Books: An Inventory and Some Conclusions, Berkeley and Los Angeles: University of California Press, 1945.
- The Bibliographical History of Anonyma and Pseudonyma, Chicago: University of Chicago Press (for the Newberry Library), 1951. Joint author: F. J. Mosher.
- A History of Bibliographies of Bibliographies, New Brunswick, New Jersey: Scarecrow Press, 1955.
- Book Catalogues: Their Varieties and Uses, Chicago: Newberry Library, 1957. Rev. ed., New York: Frederic C. Beil, 1987; St Paul's Bibliographies, 1987.
- Catalogues of Rare Books: A Chapter in Bibliographical History, Lawrence, Kansas: University of Kansas Libraries, 1958.
