= Exeter Book Riddles =

Old English word puzzles

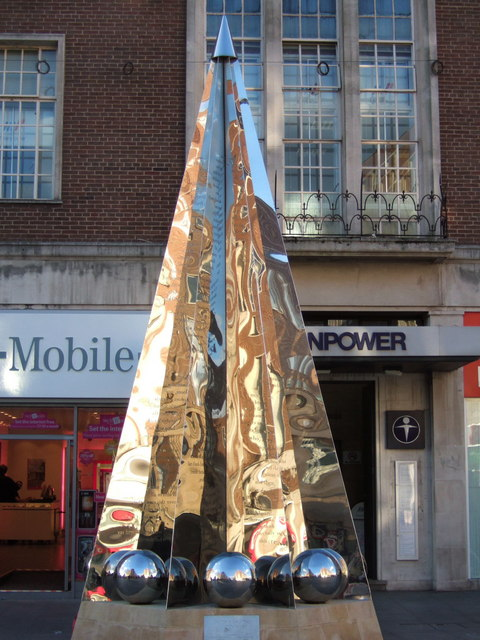
The modern sculpture 'The Riddle' on Exeter High Street by Michael Fairfax, which is inscribed with texts of Old English riddles and evokes how they reflect the material world.

The Exeter Book riddles are a fragmentary collection of verse riddles in Old English found in the later tenth-century anthology of Old English poetry known as the Exeter Book. Today standing at around ninety-four (scholars debate precisely how many there are because divisions between poems are not always clear), the Exeter Book riddles account for almost all the riddles attested in Old English, and a major component of the otherwise mostly Latin corpus of riddles from early medieval England.

== Sources ==
One riddle, known as Exeter Book riddle 30, is found twice in the Exeter Book (with some textual variation), indicating that the Exeter Book was compiled from more than one pre-existing manuscript collection of Old English riddles. Considerable scholarly effort has gone into reconstructing what these exemplars may have been like.

Four of the riddles originate as translations from the Latin riddles of Aldhelm, emphasising that the Exeter Book riddles were at least partly influenced by Latin riddling in early medieval England: riddles 35 (mailcoat, also found in an eighth-century version in a ninth-century manuscript), and 40, 66, and 94 (all derived from Aldhelm's hundredth riddle, De creatura).

Some riddles seem to have come directly from vernacular tradition.

== Form and style ==
The riddles are all written in alliterative verse, and frequently end with an injunction to 'say what I am called', suggesting that they were recited as oral entertainment. Like other Old English poetry, the riddles make extensive use of compound nouns and adjectives. When metaphorical, these compounds become what could be considered riddles within the riddle itself, and the audience must be attentive to any double meanings or "hinge words" in order to discover the answer to the riddle. The riddles offer a new perspective on the mundane world and often poetically personify their subject. In this respect, they can be situated within a wider tradition of 'speaking objects' in Anglo-Saxon culture and have much in common with poems such as The Dream of the Rood and The Husband's Message and with artefacts such as the Franks Casket, Alfred Jewel, and Brussels Cross, which endow inanimate things with first-person voices.

Unlike the Latin riddles from early medieval England, the Old English ones tend not to rely on intellectual obscurity to make the riddle more difficult for the reader, rather focusing on describing processes of manufacture and transformation. And again in contrast to manuscripts of the Latin riddles, the Exeter Book does not state the solutions to its riddles. The search for their solutions has been addressed at length by Patrick J. Murphy, focusing on thought patterns of the period, but there is still no unanimous agreement on some of them.

== Contents ==
The Exeter Book riddles are varied in theme, but they are all used to engage and challenge the readers mentally. By representing the familiar, material world from an oblique angle, many not only draw on but also complicate or challenge social norms such as martial masculinity, patriarchal attitudes to women, lords' dominance over their servants, and humans' over animals. Thirteen, for example, have as their solution an implement, which speaks of itself through the riddle as a servant to its lord; but these sometimes also suggest the power of the servant to define the master.

The majority of the riddles have religious themes and answers. Some of the religious contexts within the riddles are "manuscript book (or Bible)," "soul and body," "fish and river" (fish are often used to symbolize Christ). The riddles also were written about common objects, and even animals were used as inspiration for some of the riddles. One example of a typical, religious riddle is Riddle 41, which describes the soul and body:

A noble guest of great lineage dwells
In the house of man. Grim hunger
Cannot harm him, nor feverish thirst,
Nor age, nor illness. If the servant
Of the guest who rules, serves well
On the journey, they will find together
Bliss and well-being, a feast of fate;
If the slave will not as a brother be ruled
By a lord he should fear and follow
Then both will suffer and sire a family
Of sorrows when, springing from the world,
They leave the bright bosom of one kinswoman,
Mother and sister, who nourished them.
Let the man who knows noble words
Say what the guest and servant are called.

^{Trans. by Craig Williamson, A Feast of Creatures: Anglo-Saxon Riddle-Songs (1982)}

While the Exeter Book was found in a cathedral library, and while it is clear that religious scribes worked on the riddles, not all of the riddles in the book are religiously themed. Many of the answers to the riddles are everyday, common objects. There are also many double entendres, which can lead to an answer that is obscene. One example of this is Riddle 23/25:

I am wonderful help to women,
The hope of something to come. I harm
No citizen except my slayer.
Rooted I stand on a high bed.
I am shaggy below. Sometimes the beautiful
Peasant's daughter, an eager-armed,
Proud woman grabs my body,
Rushes my red skin, holds me hard,
Claims my head. The curly-haired
Woman who catches me fast will feel
Our meeting. Her eye will be wet.
^{Trans. by Craig Williamson, A Feast of Creatures: Anglo-Saxon Riddle-Songs (1982)}

One of the first answers that readers might think of would be an onion. If the reader pays close attention to the wording in the latter half of the riddle, however, he or she may be led to believe that the answer is a man's penis. Both of these answers are perfectly legitimate answers to this riddle, but one is very innocent where the other is obscene. Riddles in which such double entendre is thought to be prominent in the Exeter Book are: 2 (ox and hide), 20 (sword), 25 (onion), 37 (bellows), 42 (cock and hen), 44 (key and lock), 45 (dough), 54 (churn and butter), 61 (mailshirt or helmet), 62 (poker), 63 (glass beaker), 64 (Lot and his family), 65 (onion), 91 (key). Even though some of the riddles contained obscene meanings, that is not to say that the majority of riddles in the Exeter Book were obscene. There were more religious and animalistic riddles than obscene riddles.

Since the riddles were crammed into the pages of the manuscript with hardly any organization, many of the riddles vary in structure. The boundaries between riddles were often unclear. In fact, some remain unanswered to this day, such as 95:

I am noble, known to rest in the quiet
Keeping of many men, humble and high born.
The plunderers' joy, hauled far from friends,
Rides richly on me, shines signifying power,
Whether I proclaim the grandeur of halls,
The wealth of cities, or the glory of God.
Now wise men love most my strange way
Of offering wisdom to many without voice.
Though the children of earth eagerly seek
To trace my trail, sometimes my tracks are dim.

^{Trans. by Craig Williamson, A Feast of Creatures: Anglo-Saxon Riddle-Songs (1982)}

=== List of Exeter Book Riddles ===
The Exeter Book Riddles have the following solutions (according to the Riddle Ages blog and Paull F. Baum), and numbered according to the edition by Krapp and Dobbie.

Folios	Solutions (1-88 Riddle Ages, 89-95 Baum unless otherwise stated)	Numbering		
Folios	Solutions (1-88 Riddle Ages, 89-95 Baum unless otherwise stated)	(Krapp and Dobbie)	(Williamson)	(Baum)
101r	Storm, Wind, etc.	1	1a	1
101r	Storm, Wind, etc.	2	1b	2
101v-102v	Storm, Wind, etc.	3	1c	
102v	Bell (most widely supported), Bucket, Plough-team, etc.	4	2	35
102v	Shield (most widely supported), Chopping Block, Guilt	5	3	49
102v-103r	Sun	6	4	17
103r	Swan	7	5	21
103r	Nightingale (likely), Pipe or Flute, all manner of other birds, etc.	8	6	22
103r-v	Cuckoo	9	7	20
103v	Barnacle Goose	10	8	23
103v	Wine or Cup of Wine	11	9	18
103v-104r	Ox, Ox-hide, Leather (object), etc.	12	10	24
104r	Flock of sheep, ten chickens (this is the generally accepted one), ten pheasants, butterfly cocoon, alphabet, moth, fingers and gloves	13	11	28
104r	Horn	14	12	53
104v	Badger, Fox, Porcupine, Hedgehog, Weasel	15	13	29
104v-105r	Anchor	16	14	57
105r	Ballista, Fortress, Quiver, Bee-skep, etc.	17	15	52
105r	Jug, Amphora, Cask, Leather bottle, Inkhorn, Phallus	18	16	
105r	Ship, Falconry/Horseman and hawk [sometimes with wagon/servant] and Writing	19	17	71
105r-105v	Sword, Falcon/Hawk, Phallus	20	18	51
106r	Plough	21	19	32
106r-106v	Ursa Major, (days of the) month, bridge, New Year, stars	22	20	63
106v	Bow	23	21	46
106v	Jay, Magpie, Woodpecker	24	22	69
106v-107r	Onion, leek, mustard, phallus, etc.	25	23	76
107r-107v	Book, Bible, Gospel Book	26	24	43
107v	Mead, Whip, Sleep	27	25	59
107v	John Barleycorn, Wine cask, Beer, Ale, Mead, Harp, Stringed instrument, Tortoise lyre, Yew horn, Barrow, Trial of soul, Pattern-welded sword, Parchment, Biblical codex	28	26	60
107v-108r	Sun and moon, swallow and sparrow, cloud and wind, bird and wind	29	27	3
108r	Beam, Cross, Wood, Tree, Snowflake	30 a and b	28 a and b	14
108r-108v	Psaltery and Quill-pick, Quill-pen and Fingers, Bagpipe, Fiddle, Portable Organ, Organistrum, Harp, Cithara	31	29	44
108v	Ship, Wagon, Millstone, Wheel, Wheelbarrow	32	30	58
108v-109r	Iceberg, Ice, Ice-floe	33	31	6
109r	Rake	34	32	31
109r-109v	Mail-coat (i.e. armour)	35	33	50
109v	Ship; Man woman horse; Two men, woman, horses, dog, bird on ship; Waterfowl hunt; Pregnant horse, two pregnant women; Hunting; Sow and five piglets	36	34	73
109v	Bellows, Wagon	37	35	81
109v	(Young) Ox, Bullock	38	36	26
109v-110r	Dream, Death, Cloud, Speech, Faith, Day, Moon, Time, Comet	39	37	4
110r-111v	Creation	40	38	11
112r	Water, Wisdom, Creation	41	39	
112r	N N Æ A A H H = hana & hæn, or Cock and Hen	42	40	70
112r-112v	Soul and Body	43	41	10
112v	Key and lock, Phallus, Dagger sheath	44	42	75
112v	Dough	45	43	77
112v	Lot and his Daughters	46	44	64
112v-113r	Book-worm, Book-moth, Maggot and psalter	47	45	42
113r	Paten, Chalice, Sacramental vessel	48	46	15
113r	Oven, Beehive, Falcon Cage, (Book)case, Pen and ink, Barrow, Sacrificial altar, Millpond and sluice	49	47	38
113r	Fire, Anger, Dog	50	48	8
113r-113v	Pen and fingers	51	49	40
113v	Buckets, Broom, Flail, Yoked oxen	52	50	66
113v	Battering Ram is the most common solution, but Cross and Gallows have also been suggested	53	51	47
113v-114r	Butter churn, Baker's boy and oven	54	52	78
114r	Shield, Scabbard, Harp, Cross, Gallows, Sword rack, Sword box, Hengen	55	53	13
114r	Loom, Lathe	56	54	37
114r-114v	Swifts, Swallows, Crows, Jackdaws, Starlings, House martins, Letters, Musical notes, Gnats, Stormclouds, Hailstones, Raindrops, Bees, Midges, Damned souls, or Demons	57	55	19
114v	Well-sweep	58	56	34
114v-115r	Chalice	59	57	16
122v-123r	Reed (pen), Rune staff	60	58	41
124v	Shirt/Kirtle/Tunic, Garment, Helmet	61	59	79
124v-125r	Poker, Boring tool, Phallus	62	60	80
125r	Glass beaker, Flask, Flute	63	61	84
125r	Man on horseback; falconry; ship; scribe; writing	64	62	72
125r	Onion, Leek, Chives	65	63	39
125r-125v	Creation, God	66	64	12
125v	Bible, Religious Book	67	65	
125v	Ice, Iceberg, Icicle, Frozen Pond	68, 69	66	7
125v-126r	(Church) Bell, Shawm/Shepherd's Pipe, (Double) Flute, Harp, Lyre, Organistrum, Shuttle; Lines 5-6 as a separate riddle: Lighthouse, Candle	70	67, 68	45
126r	Cupping-glass, Iron Helmet, Iron Shield, Bronze Shield, Sword or Dagger, Sword-hilt, Iron Ore, Retainer	71	69	
126r	Ox, Heifer, Cow	72	70	25
126r-126v	Spear, bow, cross	73	71	48
126v	Cuttlefish, Boat and oak, Quill pen, Ship's figurehead, Siren, Water	74	72	67
127r	Hound, Piss, Hound and Hind, Christ	75, 76	73	74, 27
127r	Oyster	77	74	30
127r	Crab, Oyster, Fish, Lamprey	78	75	
127r	Horn, Falcon, Hawk, Spear, Sword, Scabbard	79, 80	76	54
127v	Weathercock, Ship, Visored helmet	81	77	36
127v	Crab, harrow	82	78	
127v	Ore; metal; gold; coins; revenant; spirit	83	79	9
127v-128v	Water	84	80	5
128v	Fish and River, Body and Soul	85	81	62
128v-129r	One-eyed Seller of Garlic	86	82	61
129r-129v	Bellows	87	83	
129v	Antler, Inkhorn, Horn, Body and Soul	88	84, 85	55
129v	?	89	86	
129v	? (a Latin text, arguably not actually a riddle)	90		
129v-130r	Key	91	87	33
130r	?	92	88	
130r	Inkhorn	93	89	56
130r-130v	Creation	94	90	
130v	Book, wandering singer, moon, sun	95	91	68

== Editions and translations ==
- Andy Orchard (ed. and trans.), The Old English and Anglo-Latin Riddle Tradition, Dumbarton Oaks Medieval Library 69 (Cambridge, MA: Harvard University Press, 2021); accompanied by Andy Orchard, A Commentary on the Old English and Anglo-Latin Riddle Tradition, Supplements to the Dumbarton Oaks Medieval Library (Washington, DC: Dumbarton Oaks, 2021).
- The Riddle Ages: Early Medieval Riddles, Translations and Commentaries, ed. by Megan Cavell and others, 2nd edn (Birmingham: University of Birmingham, 2020–).
- Martin Foys, et al. (eds) Old English Poetry in Facsimile Project (Madison, WI: Center for the History of Print and Digital Culture, 2019-), with translations from the Old English Poetry Project, Ophelia Eryn Hostetter (trans.).

=== Edition only ===
- The Riddles of the Exeter Book, ed. by Frederick Tupper (Boston: Ginn, c1910), archive.org, Wikimedia Commons
- Elliott van Kirk Dobbie and George Philip Krapp (eds), The Exeter Book, Anglo-Saxon Poetic Records 3 (New York: Columbia University Press, 1936), digitised at https://web.archive.org/web/20181206091232/http://ota.ox.ac.uk/desc/3009
- Craig Williamson (ed), The Old English Riddles of the Exeter Book (Chapel Hill: University of North Carolina Press, 1977)
- Bernard J. Muir (ed), The Exeter Anthology of Old English Poetry: An Edition of Exeter Dean and Chapter MS 3501, 2nd edn, 2 vols (Exeter: University of Exeter Press, 2000)

==== Translation only ====
- Paull F. Baum, Anglo-Saxon Riddles of the Exeter Book (Durham, North Carolina: Duke University Press, 1963), https://en.wikisource.org/wiki/Anglo-Saxon_Riddles_of_the_Exeter_Book
- Kevin Crossley-Holland (trans), The Exeter Book Riddles, revised edition (London: Enitharmon Press, 2008)
- Greg Delanty, Seamus Heaney and Michael Matto, The Word Exchange: Anglo-Saxon Poems in Translation (New York: Norton, 2010)
- F. H. Whitman (ed and trans), Old English Riddles (Ottawa: Canadian Federation for the Humanities, 1982)
- Craig Williamson (trans), A Feast of Creatures: Anglo-Saxon Riddle-Songs (Philadelphia: University of Pennsylvania Press, 1982)
