= De creatura =

Medieval Latin riddle

De creatura ('On Creation') is an 83-line Latin polystichic poem by the seventh- to eighth-century Anglo-Saxon poet Aldhelm and an important text among Anglo-Saxon riddles. The poem seeks to express the wondrous diversity of creation, usually by drawing vivid contrasts between different natural phenomena, one of which is usually physically higher and more magnificent, and one of which is usually physically lower and more mundane.

De creatura is one of two of Aldhelm's riddles known to have been translated into Old English (the other being the Leiden Riddle): a fairly close but expansive, albeit now fragmentary, translation survives as the 108-line Riddle 40 of the Exeter Book (according to the numbering of the Anglo-Saxon Poetic Records). This was itself shortened and reworked as the ten-line Riddle 66, and adapted even further as the now largely lost, presently six-line Riddle 94, both also found in the Exeter Book. These riddles stand as a rare example of an Old English poem surviving in multiple copies.

== Aldhelm's De creatura ==
De creatura is the culminatory hundredth poem of Aldhelm's collection of verse riddles, known as the Enigmata, and also much the longest. The Enigmata survive included in his work on Latin poetics, the Epistola ad Acircium (presumably composed during the reign of its apparent addressee, Aldfrith of Northumbria, 685-704/5). Many of the Enigmata are based on the riddles of Symphosius. Not, however, De creatura.

== Riddle 40 ==
Linguistic evidence suggests that Riddle 40 was probably not composed before the tenth century. This is consistent with the fact that it was clearly translated from a recension of Aldhelm's poem in which lines 61-67 have been moved to before line 44. As the only manuscript of De creatura from Anglo-Saxon England to contain this recension is Oxford, Bodleian Library, Rawlinson C. 697, originally written on the Continent but brought to England by the earlier tenth century, and since this manuscript contains some glosses consistent with Riddle 40, it is conceivable and even likely that Riddle 40 was translated from Rawlinson C. 697 itself. Thomas A. Bredehoft has gone so far as to argue that Riddle 40 enjoys relatively little formulaic diction, but that those lines it does have in common with other Old English poems suggest a particularly strong association with other Exeter Book poems, suggesting that the translation must have been done in the mid-tenth century by someone familiar with a similar corpus of texts, and familiar with Dunstan's promotion of interest in Aldhelm at Glastonbury.

Riddle 40 was given unusual prominence by the scribe of the Exeter Book, and might in an exemplar of the manuscript have stood as the culmination of a collection of 40 Old English riddles. Unfortunately its ending is lost due to a missing bifolium in the manuscript.

== Riddle 66 ==
As edited by Krapp and Dobbie and translated by Sebo, Riddle 66 reads:

Ic eom mare þonne þes middangeard,
læsse þonne hondwyrm, leohtre þonne mona,
swiftre þonne sunne. Sæs me sind ealle
flodas on fæðmum ond þes foldan bearm,
grene wongas. Grundum ic hrine,
helle underhnige, heofonas oferstige,
wuldres eþel, wide ræce
ofer engla eard, eorþan gefylle,
ealne middangeard ond merestreamas
side mid me sylfum. Saga hwæt ic hatte.

Translation:

I am greater than this middle-earth,
less than a hand-worm, lighter than the moon,
swifter than the sun. All the seas' tides
are in my embraces and the earthen breast,
the green fields. I touch the foundations,
I sink under hell, I soar over the heavens,
the glorious realm; I reach wide
over the homeland of angels; I fill the earth abundantly,
the entire world and the streams of the oceans
with myself. Say what I am called.

Riddle 66 has been praised for its tight composition, paring down the exuberant Riddle 40 to a cosmographical focus, giving an elegant structure and memorable form, most of which is paralleled in Riddle 94.

== Riddle 94 ==
Riddle 94 is mostly now lost due to damage to the Exeter Book. As edited by Krapp and Dobbie and translated by Sebo, Riddle 66 reads:

Smeþr/ /ad,
hyrre þonne heofon/
glædre þonne sunne,
/style,
smeare þonne sealtry/
leofre þonne þis leoht eall, leohtre þon w/
Smoother ... | Higher than Heaven ... | ... brighter than the sun, | Sharper than salt ... Dearer than all this light, lighter than the w[ind].

== Editions ==
Major editions and translations of Aldhelm's Latin are:

- Ehwald, Rvdolfvs (ed.), Aldhelmi Opera, Monumenta Germanicae Historica, Auctorum Antiquissorum, 15, 3 vols (Berlin, 1919), http://www.dmgh.de/
- Pittman, James Hall (ed. and trans.), The Riddles of Aldhelm (Yale University Press, 1925)
- Lapidge, Michael and James L. Rosier (trans.), Aldhelm: The Poetic Works (Cambridge University Press, 1985)
- Orchard, Andy, The Poetic Art of Aldhelm (Cambridge University Press, 1994)
- Juster, A. M., Saint Aldhelm's Riddles (University of Toronto Press, 2015)

Major editions of the Old English adaptations are:

- Krapp, George Philip and Elliott Van Kirk Dobbie (eds), The Exeter Book, The Anglo-Saxon Poetic Records, 3 (New York: Columbia University Press, 1936), pp. 200-03, 230-31, 242 [nos 40, 66, 94].
- Williamson, Craig (ed.), The Old English Riddles of the Exeter Book (Chapel Hill: University of North Carolina Press, 1977).
- Muir, Bernard J. (ed.), The Exeter Anthology of Old English Poetry: An Edition of Exeter Dean and Chapter MS 3501, 2nd edn, 2 vols (Exeter: Exeter University Press, 2000), nos 40, 66, 93.

== Recordings ==
- Michael D. C. Drout, 'Riddle 40', performed from the Anglo-Saxon Poetic Records edition (26 October 2007).
- Michael D. C. Drout, 'Riddle 66', performed from the Anglo-Saxon Poetic Records edition (15 November 2007).
- Michael D. C. Drout, 'Riddle 94', performed from the Anglo-Saxon Poetic Records edition (21 November 2007).
