= Exeter Book Riddle 65 =

Exeter Book Riddle 65 (according to the numbering of the Anglo-Saxon Poetic Records) is one of the Old English riddles found in the later tenth-century Exeter Book. Suggested solutions have included Onion, Leek, and Chives, but the consensus is that the solution is Onion.

== Text and translation ==
As edited by Krapp and Dobbie and translated by Andrew Higl, the riddle reads:

Cwico wæs ic, ne cwæð ic wiht, cwele ic efne seþeah.
ær ic wæs, eft ic cwom. æghwa mec reafað,
hafað mec on headre, ond min heafod scireþ,
biteð mec on bær lic, briceð mine wisan.
Monnan ic ne bite, nympþe he me bite;
sindan þara monige þe mec bitað.

Translation:

I was alive but did not speak; even so I die.
Back I came before I was. Everyone plunders me,
keeps me confined, and shears my head,
bites on my bare body, breaks my sprouts.
I bite no one unless the person bites me;
many there are who do bite me.

== Analogues ==
The riddle is frequently compared with Exeter Book Riddle 25, also on the onion, but noted for its double entendre, since in that riddle what to many readers will come first to mind as the obvious solution to the riddle is 'penis'. Meanwhile, its analogue in the late-antique Latin riddles of Symphosius is:

mordeo mordentes, ultro non mordeo quemquam;
sed sunt mordentem multi mordere parati:
nemo timet morsum, dentes quia non habet ullos.

Translation:

I bite those who are biting; of my own accord I do not bite anyone;
but there are many ready to bite me as I am biting;
no one fears my bite, since it does not have any teeth.

== Editions ==
- Krapp, George Philip and Elliott Van Kirk Dobbie (eds), The Exeter Book, The Anglo-Saxon Poetic Records, 3 (New York: Columbia University Press, 1936), p. 230.
- Williamson, Craig (ed.), The Old English Riddles of the Exeter Book (Chapel Hill: University of North Carolina Press, 1977).
- Muir, Bernard J. (ed.), The Exeter Anthology of Old English Poetry: An Edition of Exeter Dean and Chapter MS 3501, 2nd edn, 2 vols (Exeter: Exeter University Press, 2000).
- Smith, Kyle (ed.) Old English Poetry in Facsimile Project (Center for the History of Print and Digital Culture, University of Wisconsin-Madison, 2019-).
