= Exeter Book Riddle 33 =

Old English riddle

Exeter Book Riddle 33 (according to the numbering of the Anglo-Saxon Poetic Records) is one of the Old English riddles found in the later 10th-century Exeter Book. Its solution is accepted to be 'Iceberg' (though there have been other proposals along similar lines). The most extensive commentary on the riddle is by Corinne Dale, whose ecofeminist analysis of the riddles discusses how the iceberg is portrayed through metaphors of warrior violence but at the same time femininity.

== Text and translation ==
As edited by Craig Williamson and translated by Corinne Dale, the riddle reads:

Wiht cwom æfter wege wrætlicu liþan;
cymlic from ceole cleopode to londe,
hlinsade hlude – hleahtor wæs gryrelic,
egesful on earde. Ecge wæron scearpe;
wæs hio hetegrim, hilde to sæne,
biter beadoweorca. Bordweallas grof,
heardhiþende. Heterune bond!
Sægde searocræftig ymb hyre sylfre gesceaft:
“Is min modor mægða cynnes
þæs deorestan þæt is dohtor min
eacen uploden; swa þæt is ældum cuþ,
firum on folce, þæt seo on foldan sceal
on ealra londa gehwam lissum stondan.”

Translation:

A rare, beautiful creature came sailing along the wave,
called from its throat to the land,
resounding loudly; the laughter was fearsome,
terrible on earth; her edges were sharp.
She was cruel, slow to combat,
her battle-work was fierce; [she] carved into the ship-walls,
plundering hard. She bound a hateful curse;
the crafty one spoke about her own creation:
“My mother is from the dearest
of women-kind; that is my daughter,
[who] grew up pregnant—so it is evident to men,
to people in a nation, that she must stand blessedly
on earth, in each and every land.”

== Editions ==
- Krapp, George Philip and Elliott Van Kirk Dobbie (eds), The Exeter Book, The Anglo-Saxon Poetic Records, 3 (New York: Columbia University Press, 1936), https://web.archive.org/web/20181206091232/http://ota.ox.ac.uk/desc/3009.
- Williamson, Craig (ed.), The Old English Riddles of the Exeter Book (Chapel Hill: University of North Carolina Press, 1977), no. 31.
- Muir, Bernard J. (ed.), The Exeter Anthology of Old English Poetry: An Edition of Exeter Dean and Chapter MS 3501, 2nd edn, 2 vols (Exeter: University of Exeter Press, 2000).
- Foys, Martin et al. (eds.) Old English Poetry in Facsimile Project, (Madison, WI: Center for the History of Print and Digital Culture, University of Wisconsin–Madison, 2019-). Online edition annotated and linked to digital facsimile, with a Modern English translation.

=== Recordings ===
- Michael D. C. Drout, 'Riddle 33', performed from the Anglo-Saxon Poetic Records edition (25 October 2007).
