= Exeter Book Riddle 61 =

Old English riddle

Exeter Book Riddle 61 (according to the numbering of the Anglo-Saxon Poetic Records) is one of the Old English riddles found in the later 10th-century Exeter Book. The riddle is usually solved as 'shirt', 'mailcoat' or 'helmet'. It is noted as one of a number of Old English riddles with sexual connotations and as a source for gender-relations in early medieval England.

== Text ==
As edited by Krapp and Dobbie in the Anglo-Saxon Poetic Records series (with the addition of marking of long vowels), and translated by Megan Cavell, Riddle 61 runs:

Oft mec fæste bilēac frēolicu mēowle,
ides on earce, hwīlum up atēah
folmum sīnum ond frēan sealde,
holdum þēodne, swā hīo hāten wæs.
Siðþan mē on hreþre heafod sticade,
nioþan upweardne, on nearo fēgde.
Gif þæs ondfengan ellen dohte,
mec frætwedne fyllan sceolde
rūwes nāthwæt. Rǣd hwæt ic mǣne.

Often a noble woman, a lady, locked me
fast in a chest, sometimes she drew me up
with her hands and gave me to her husband,
her loyal lord, as she was bid.
Then he stuck his head in the heart of me,
upward from beneath, fitted it in the tight space.
If the strength of the receiver was suitable,
something shaggy had to fill
me, the adorned one. Determine what I mean.

== Editions ==
Smith, Kyle (ed.) Old English Poetry in Facsimile Project (Center for the History of Print and Digital Culture, University of Wisconsin-Madison, 2019-).
