= Exeter Book Riddle 47 =

Old English riddle

Exeter Book Riddle 47 (according to the numbering of the Anglo-Saxon Poetic Records) is one of the most famous of the Old English riddles found in the later 10th-century Exeter Book. Its solution is 'book-worm' or 'moth'.

== Text ==
Original

Moððe word fræt. Mē þæt þuhte
wrǣtlicu wyrd, þā ic þæt wundor gefrægn,
þæt se wyrm forswealg wera gied sumes,
þēof in þȳstro, þrymfæstne cwide
ond þæs strangan staþol. Stælgiest ne wæs
wihte þȳ glēawra, þe hē þām wordum swealg.

Formal equivalence

A moth ate words. To me that seemed
a fantastical event, when I found that wonder out,
that a worm swallowed the poem of a some person,
a thief in darkness, a glorious statement
and its strong foundation. The thieving stranger was not
a whit more wise that he swallowed those words.

Translation

A moth ate words. I thought that was a marvelous fate,
that the worm, a thief in the dark, should eat
a man's words — a brilliant statement,
its foundation strong. Not a whit the wiser
was he for having fattened himself on those words.

== Glossary ==
form in text	headword form	grammatical information	key meanings
ic	ic	personal pronoun	I
cwide	cwide	masculine strong noun	utterance, sentence, saying
forswealg	for-swelgan	strong verb	swallow up, consume
fræt	fretan	strong verb	devour, eat, consume, gnaw away
gied	giedd	neuter strong noun	poem, song, report, tale, utterance, saying
glēawra	glēaw	adjective	wise, discerning, prudent
hē	hē	personal pronoun	he
moððe	moððe	feminine weak noun	moth
ond	and	conjunction	and
ne	ne	negative particle	not
se	se	masculine demonstrative pronoun	that
stælgiest	stæl-giest	masculine strong noun	stealing guest, theft-guest
staþol	staðol	masculine strong noun	base, foundation, support
strang	strang	adjective	strong, powerful, bold, brave, severe
sumes	sum	indefinite pronoun	a certain one, someone, something
swealg	swelgan	strong verb	swallow
þā	þā	adverb	then, when
þām	se	demonstrative pronoun	that
þæt	þæt	1. neuter demonstrative pronoun; 2. adverb	1. it, that; 2. so that
þe	þe	relative particle	who, which, that
þēof	þēof	masculine strong noun	criminal, thief, robber
þrymfæstne	þrym-fæst	adjective	glorious, noble, mighty
þuhte	þyncan	weak verb	seem
þȳ	þæt	demonstrative pronoun	it, that
þȳstro	þēostru	feminine noun	darkness
wæs	wesan	irregular verb	be
wera	wer	masculine strong noun	man
wihte	wihte	adverb	at all
word	word	neuter strong noun	word, utterance
wordum	word	neuter strong noun	word, utterance
wrǣtlicu	wrǣtlic	adjective	wondrous, strange; artistic, ornamental
wyrd	wyrd	feminine strong noun	event, fate
wyrm	wyrm	masculine strong noun	worm, maggot

== Interpretation ==
The extensive commentary on this riddle is concisely summarised by Cavell, and more fully by Foys.

== Editions ==
- Krapp, George Philip and Elliott Van Kirk Dobbie (eds), The Exeter Book, The Anglo-Saxon Poetic Records, 3 (New York: Columbia University Press, 1936), p. 236.
- Williamson, Craig (ed.), The Old English Riddles of the Exeter Book (Chapel Hill: University of North Carolina Press, 1977).
- Muir, Bernard J. (ed.), The Exeter Anthology of Old English Poetry: An Edition of Exeter Dean and Chapter MS 3501, 2nd edn, 2 vols (Exeter: University of Exeter Press, 2000).
- Foys, Martin et al. (eds.) Old English Poetry in Facsimile Project, (Madison, WI: Center for the History of Print and Digital Culture, University of Wisconsin–Madison, 2019-). Online edition annotated and linked to digital facsimile, with a modern translation.

=== Recordings ===
- Michael D. C. Drout, 'Riddle 47', performed from the Anglo-Saxon Poetic Records edition (29 October 2007).
