= Exeter Book Riddle 45 =

Old English riddle

Exeter Book Riddle 45 (according to the numbering of the Anglo-Saxon Poetic Records) is one of the Old English riddles found in the later 10th-century Exeter Book. Its solution is accepted to be 'dough'. However, the description evokes a penis becoming erect; as such, Riddle 45 is noted as one of a small group of Old English riddles that engage in sexual double entendre, and thus provides rare evidence for Anglo-Saxon attitudes to sexuality, and specifically for women taking the initiative in heterosexual sex.

== Text and translation ==
As edited by Krapp and Dobbie, the riddle reads:

Ic on wincle gefrægn weaxan nathwæt,
þindan ond þunian, þecene hebban;
on þæt banlease bryd grapode,
hygewlonc hondum, hrægle þeahte
þrindende þing þeodnes dohtor.

Translation:

I have heard of something that grows in a corner,
swelling and standing up, lifting up its covering.
Upon that boneless thing a proud-minded woman
gripped with her hands; with her garment a lord's daughter
covered the swollen thing.

== Editions ==
- Krapp, George Philip and Elliott Van Kirk Dobbie (eds), The Exeter Book, The Anglo-Saxon Poetic Records, 3 (New York: Columbia University Press, 1936), p. 205, https://web.archive.org/web/20181206091232/http://ota.ox.ac.uk/desc/3009.
- Williamson, Craig (ed.), The Old English Riddles of the Exeter Book (Chapel Hill: University of North Carolina Press, 1977), pp. 96-97 [no. 43].
- Muir, Bernard J. (ed.), The Exeter Anthology of Old English Poetry: An Edition of Exeter Dean and Chapter MS 3501, 2nd edn, 2 vols (Exeter: University of Exeter Press, 2000).
- Foys, Martin et al. (eds.) Old English Poetry in Facsimile Project, (Madison, WI: Center for the History of Print and Digital Culture, University of Wisconsin–Madison, 2019-). Online edition annotated and linked to digital facsimile, with a modern translation.

=== Recordings ===
- Michael D. C. Drout, 'Riddle 45', performed from the Anglo-Saxon Poetic Records edition (29 October 2007).
