= Epistola ad Acircium =

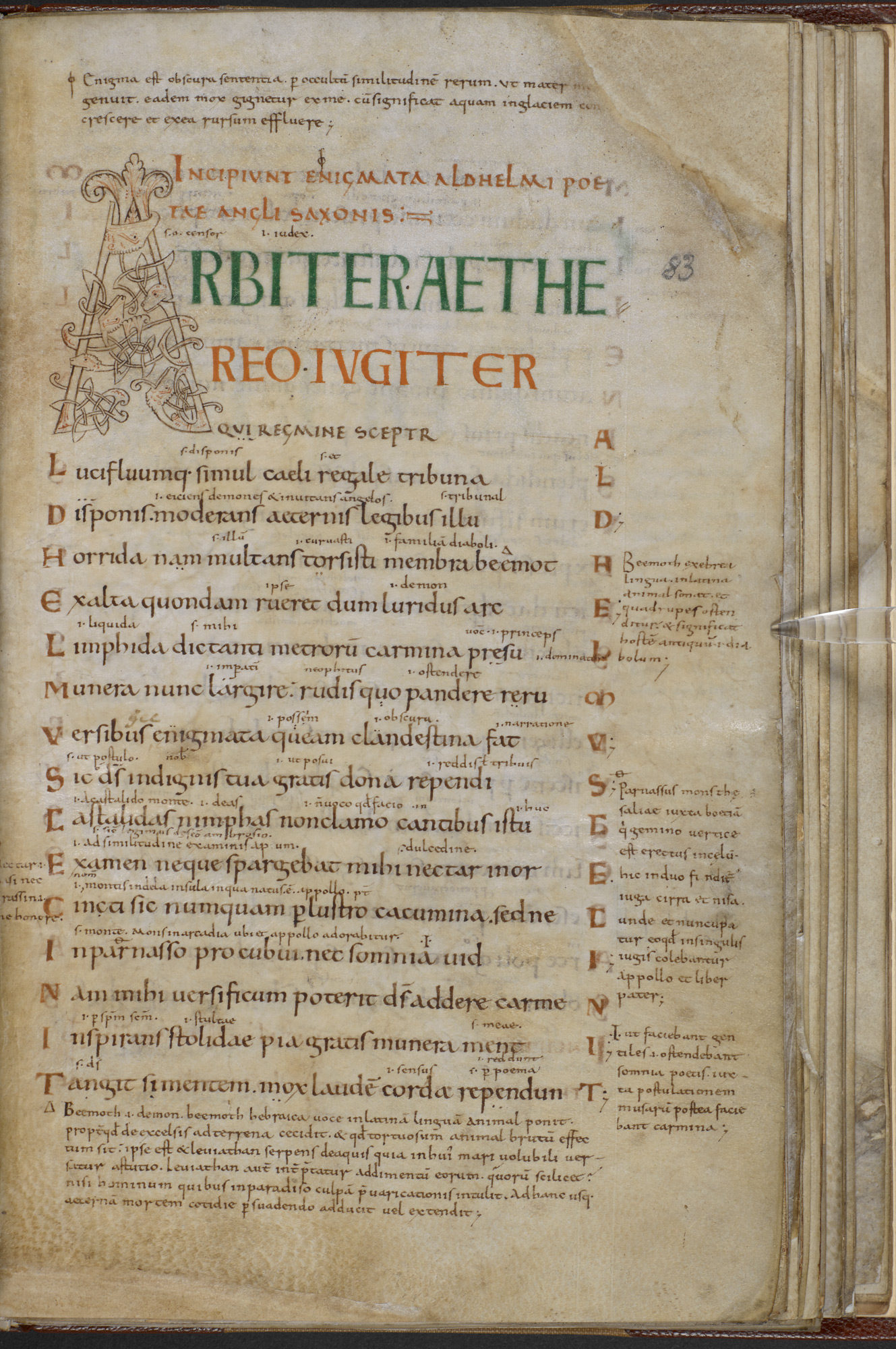
The late 10th-century or early 11th-century London, British Library, Royal MA 12 c xxiii, folio 83r, showing the beginning of Aldhelm's acrostic preface

The Epistola ad Acircium, sive Liber de septenario, et de metris, aenigmatibus ac pedum regulis ('letter to Acircius, or the book on sevens, and on metres, riddles, and the regulation of poetic feet') is a Latin treatise by the West-Saxon scholar Aldhelm (d. 709). It is dedicated to one Acircius, understood to be King Aldfrith of Northumbria (r. 685-704/5). It was a seminal text in the development of riddles as a literary form in medieval England.

== Origins ==
Aldhelm records that his riddles, which appear in this collection, were composed early in his career "as scholarly illustrations of the principles of Latin versification"; they may have been the work where he established his poetic skill in Latin. Aldhelm's chief source was Priscian's Institutiones Grammaticae.

== Contents ==
The treatise opens with a verse praefatio ("preface") addressing 'Acircius', which is remarkably contrived, incorporating both an acrostic and a telestich: the first letters of each line in the left-hand margin spell out a phrase which is paralleled by the same letters on the right-hand margin of the poem, forming a double acrostic. This 36-line message reads "Aldhelmus cecinit millenis versibus odas" ("Aldhelm composed a thousand lines in verse").

After the preface, the letter consists of three treatises:

- De septenario, treatise on the number seven in arithmology
- De metris, treatise on metre, including the Enigmata (see below).
- De pedum regulis, didactive treatise on metrical feet, such as iambs and spondees.

=== The Enigmata ===
The Epistola is best known today for including one hundred hexametrical riddles, which Aldhelm included for purposes of illustration of metrical principles. Among the more famous are the riddle entitled Lorica, and the last and longest riddle, Creatura.

Aldhelm's model was the collection known as Symposii Aenigmata ("The Riddles of Symphosius"), and many of his riddles were directly inspired by Symphosius's. But overall, Aldhelm's collection is quite different in tone and purpose: as well as being an exposition of Latin poetic metres, diction, and techniques, it seems to be intended as an exploration of the wonders of God's creation. The riddles generally become more metrically and linguistically complex as the collection proceeds. The first eight riddles deal with cosmology. Riddles 9-82 are more heterogeneous, covering a wide variety of animals, plants, artefacts, materials and phenomena, but can be seen to establish purposeful contrasts (for example between the light of a candle in Enigma 52 and that of the Great Bear in 53) or sequences (for example the animals of Enigmata 34-39: locust, screech-owl, midge, crab, pond-skater, lion). Riddles 81-99 seem all to concern monsters and wonders. Finally, the long hundredth riddle is "Creatura", the whole of Creation. The Latin enigmata of Aldhelm and his Anglo-Latin successor are presented in manuscripts with their solutions as their title, and seldom close with a challenge to the reader to guess their solution.

==== Example ====
An example of an enigma by Aldhelm is his Elleborus, by which word Aldhelm understood not the hellebore, but woody nightshade. It is number 98 in his collection:

Latin original	Literal translation	Literary translation
Ostriger en arvo vernabam frondibus hirtis Conquilio similis: sic cocci murice rubro Purpureus stillat sanguis de palmite guttis. Exuvias vitae mandenti tollere nolo Mitia nec penitus spoliabunt mente venena; Sed tamen insanum vexat dementia cordis Dum rotat in giro vecors vertigine membra.	Purple-bearing, lo!, I was growing in a field/the countryside, with shaggy/rough/hairy foliage/stalks/branches similar to a shellfish/purple-fish/purple dye/purple cloth; thus with red murex/purple dye of my berry/red dye purple blood drips/trickles from the vine-shoots in drops. I do not wish to take away from the chewer the trappings of life, nor will my gentle juices/poisons/potions utterly rob him of his mind; but nevertheless a madness of the heart shakes/agitates/torments him, mad, while, deranged by giddiness, he whirls his limbs in a circle.	A purple flower, I grow in the fields with shaggy foliage. I am very similar to an oyster: thus with reddened dye of scarlet a purplish blood oozes by drops from my branches. I do not wish to snatch away the spoils of life from him who eats me, nor do my gentle poisons deprive him utterly of reason. Nevertheless a certain touch of insanity torments him as, mad with dizziness, he whirls his limbs in a circle.

==== List of riddles ====
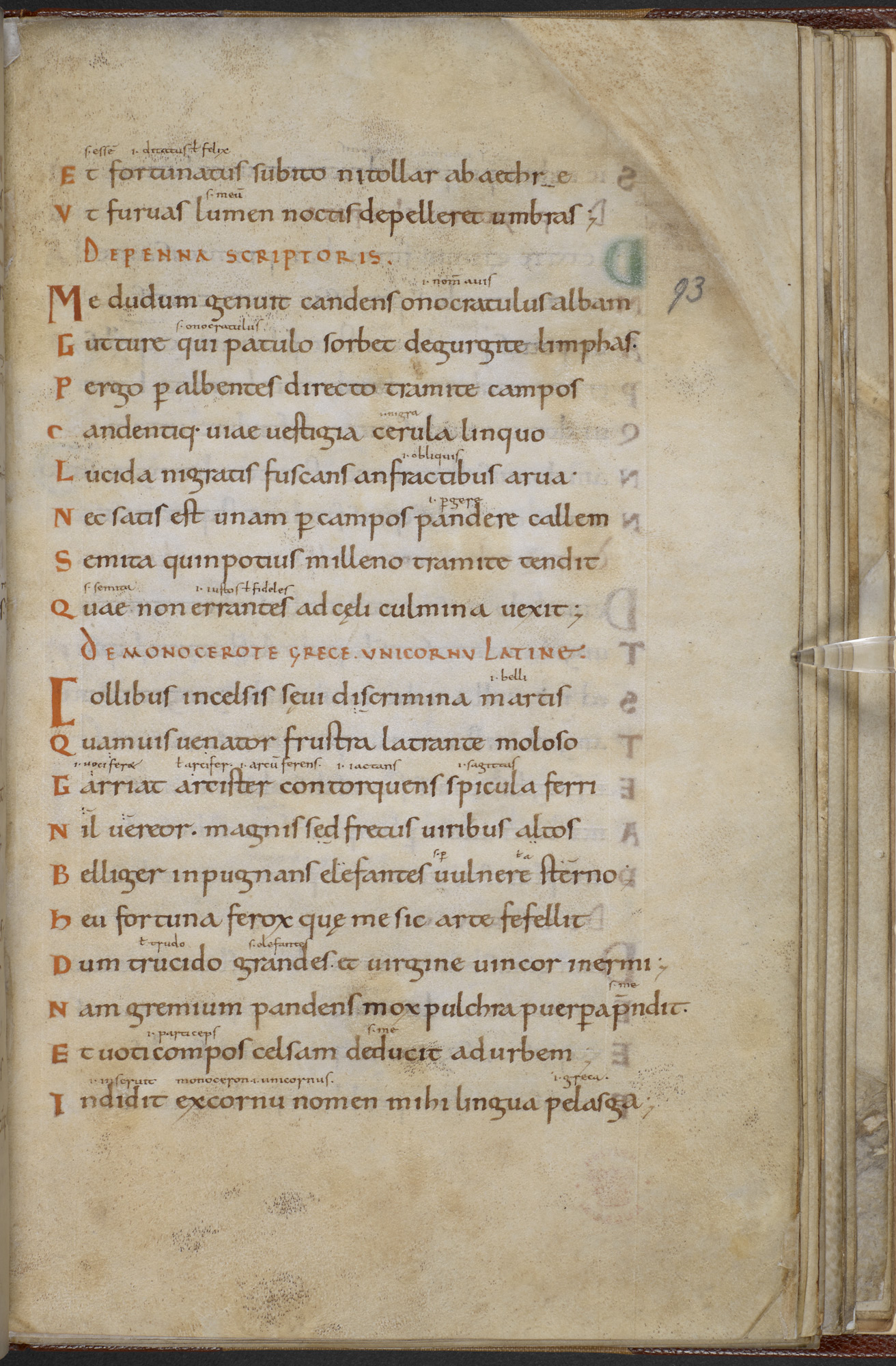
London, British Library, Royal MA 12 c xxiii folio 93r, showing Aldhelm's riddles on the pen and the unicorn

The subjects of Aldhelm's riddles are as follows.

number	title (Latin)	title (English translation)
1	terra	earth
2	ventus	wind
3	nubes	cloud
4	natura	nature
5	iris	rainbow
6	luna	moon
7	fatum	fate
8	Pliades	Pleiades
9	adamas	diamond
10	molosus	mastiff
11	poalum	bellows
12	bombix	silkworm
13	barbita	organ
14	pavo	peacock
15	salamandra	salamander
16	luligo	flying fish
17	perna	bivalve mollusc (pinna nobilis)
18	myrmicoleon	ant-lion
19	salis	salt
20	apis	bee
21	lima	file
22	acalantida	nightingale
23	trutina	scales
24	dracontia	dragon-stone
25	magnes ferrifer	lodestone
26	gallus	rooster
27	coticula	whetstone
28	Minotaurus	Minotaur
29	aqua	water
30	elementum	alphabet
31	ciconia	stork
32	pugillares	writing tablets
33	lorica	armour
34	locusta	locust
35	nycticorax	night-raven
36	scnifes	midge
37	cancer	crab
38	tippula	pond strider
39	leo	lion
40	piper	pepper
41	pulvillus	pillow
42	strutio	ostrich
43	sanguisuga	leech
44	ignis	fire
45	fusum	spindle
46	urtica	nettle
47	hirundo	swallow
48	vertico poli	sphere of the heavens
49	lebes	cauldron
50	myrifyllon	milfoil (yarrow)
51	eliotropus	heliotrope
52	candela	
53	Arcturus	Arcturus
54	cocuma duplex	double boiler
55	crismal	chrismal
56	castor	beaver
57	aquila	eagle
58	vesper sidus	evening star
59	penna	pen
60	monocerus	unicorn
61	pugio	dagger
62	famfaluca	bubble
63	corbus	raven
64	columba	dove
65	muriceps	mouser
66	mola	mill
67	cribellus	sieve
68	salpix	trumpet
69	taxus	yew
70	tortella	loaf of bread
71	piscis	fish
72	colosus	colossus
73	fons	spring
74	fundibalum	sling
75	crabro	hornet
76	melarius	apple tree
77	ficulnea	fig tree
78	cupa vinaria	wine cask
79	sol et luna	sun and moon
80	calix vitreus	glass cup
81	Lucifer	morning star
82	mustela	weasel
83	iuvencus	steer
84	scrofa praegnans	pregnant sow
85	caecus natus	man born blind
86	aries	ram
87	clipeus	shield
88	basiliscus	serpent
89	arca libraria	bookcase
90	puerpera geminas enixa	woman bearing twins
91	palma	palm
92	farus editissima	tall lighthouse
93	scintilla	spark
94	ebulus	dwarf elder
95	Scilla	Scylla
96	elefans	elephant
97	nox	night
98	elleborus	hellebore
99	camellus	camel
100	Creatura	Creation

== Influence ==
Aldhelm's riddles were almost certainly the key inspiration for the forty riddles of Tatwine, an early eighth-century Mercian priest and Archbishop of Canterbury, along with the probably slightly later riddles of Eusebius and of Boniface. Two appear in Old English translation in the tenth-century Old English Exeter Book riddles, and Aldhelm's riddles in general may have been an inspiration for that collection.

== Editions and translations ==
- Ehwald, Rudolf (ed.). Aldhelmi Opera. MGH Scriptores. Auctores antiquissimi 15. Berlin, 1919. Scans available from the Digital MGH.
- Aldhelm: The Prose Works. Trans. Michael Lapidge and Michael Herren. D. S. Brewer, 1979. ISBN 0-85991-041-5.
- Aldhelm: The Poetic Works. Trans. Michael Lapidge and James L. Rosier. Boydell & Brewer, 1984. ISBN 0-85991-146-2.

=== The Enigmata only ===
- The Riddles of Aldhelm. Text and translation by James Hall Pittman. Yale University Press, 1925.
- Through a Gloss Darkly: Aldhelm’s Riddles in the British Library ms Royal 12.C.xxiii, ed. and trans. by Nancy Porter Stork, Pontifical Institute of Mediaeval Studies, Studies and Texts, 98 (Toronto: Pontifical Institute of Mediaeval Studies, 1990). (A digital facsimile of the manuscript edited in this book is available here.)
- Saint Aldhelm's Riddles Translated by A. M. Juster, University of Toronto Press, 2015, ISBN 978-1-4426-2892-2.
