= Exeter Book Riddles 68-69 =

Old English riddle

Exeter Book folio 125v, showing Riddles 68 and 69 towards the bottom of the folio. Each is presented as a separate text, like Riddle 70 which begins on the third line from the bottom.

Exeter Book Riddles 68 and 69 (according to the numbering of the Anglo-Saxon Poetic Records) are two (or arguably one) of the Old English riddles found in the later 10th-century Exeter Book. Their interpretation has occasioned a range of scholarly investigations, but clearly has something to do with ice and one or both of the riddles are likely indeed to have the solution "ice".

== Text ==
As the image of Exeter Book folio 125v shows, Riddles 68 and 69 are clearly presented in the manuscript as different texts.

As edited by Krapp and Dobbie in the Anglo-Saxon Poetic Records series, Riddle 68 runs

Ic þa wiht geseah on weg feran;
heo wæs wrætlice wundrum gegierwed.

Translation:

I saw that being travelling on a road;
she was decorated amazingly beautifully.

Meanwhile, in their edition, Riddle 69 is the shortest text of the Exeter Book:

Wundor wearð on wege; wæter wearð to bane.

Translation:

A marvel occurred on the road: water turned to bone.

However, since at least 1858, editors have discussed reading the riddles numbered by Krapp and Dobbie as 68 and 69 as one text. This is inconsistent with the manuscript punctuation, but works well in terms of the otherwise observable conventions of Old English riddles' form and helps to make sense of Riddle 68:

Ic þa wiht geseah on weg feran;
heo wæs wrætlice wundrum gegierwed.
Wundor wearð on wege; wæter wearð to bane.

Translation:

I saw that being travelling on a road;
she was decorated amazingly beautifully.
A marvel occurred on the road: water turned to bone.

Twenty-first-century scholarship has remained divided on this question, with recent commentators arguing both for reading 68 and 69 as discrete texts or as one text.

== Interpretation ==
Reading riddles 68-69 as a single riddle with the solution "Ice", Murphy argues that "the solution snaps the text into sudden focus and reveals the great wonder of a commonplace thing".

== Editions ==
Smith, Kyle (ed.) Old English Poetry in Facsimile Project (Center for the History of Print and Digital Culture, University of Wisconsin-Madison, 2019-).

== Recordings ==
- Michael D. C. Drout, 'Riddle 69', performed from the Anglo-Saxon Poetic Records edition (15 November 2007).
