= Exeter Book Riddle 83 =

Old English riddle

Exeter Book Riddle 83 (according to the numbering of the Anglo-Saxon Poetic Records) is one of the Old English riddles found in the later tenth-century Exeter Book. Its interpretation has occasioned a range of scholarly investigations, but it is taken to mean 'Ore/Gold/Metal', with most commentators preferring 'precious metal' or 'gold', and John D. Niles arguing specifically for the Old English solution ōra, meaning both 'ore' and 'a kind of silver coin'.

== Text and translation ==
As edited by Williamson, the riddle reads:

Frōd wæs mīn fromcynn [MS. from cym] [..................]
biden in burgum, siþþan bǣles weard
[...........] wera līge [MS līfe] bewunden,
fȳre gefǣlsad. Nū mē fāh warað
eorþan brōþor, se mē ǣrest wearð
gumena tō gyrne. Ic ful gearwe gemon
hwā mīn fromcynn fruman āgētte
eall of earde; ic him yfle ne māt,
ac ic [MS. ic on] hæftnȳd hwīlum ārǣre
wīde geond wongas. Hæbbe ic wunda fela,
middangeardes mægen unlȳtel,
ac ic mīþan sceal monna gehwylcum
dēgolfulne dōm dȳran cræftes,
sīðfæt mīnne. Saga hwæt ic hātte.

Translation:

My ancestral family was venerable [...],
awaited in cities, after the guardian of conflagration
[...] of men, surrounded by flame,
cleansed by fire. Now the hostile brother
of earth guards[/inhabits?] me; he was first to turn into
the misfortune of men for me[?]. I remember very clearly
who originally wiped all my ancestors/descendants
from their homeland; I cannot do him evil,
but at times I raise up bond-oppression
widely across the lands. I have many wounds,
no little power in the world,
but I must conceal from each person
the secretive judgement of precious craftsmanship,
my journey. Say what I am called.

== Interpretation ==
Interpretation has focused on whether the riddle alludes to biblical figures, prominently Tubal-cain, though allusions to fallen angels have also been envisaged.

== Analogues ==
The principal analogue noted in past work is Riddle 91 in the collection by Symphosius on 'money':

Terra fui primo, latebris abscondita terrae;
Nunc aliud pretium flammae nomenque dederunt,
Nec iam terra vocor, licet ex me terra paretur.

Translation:

Earth-child I was, skulking in ground
Till smelt-flames offered a new name and price:
No longer earth, I can purchase the earth.

== Editions ==
- Krapp, George Philip and Elliott Van Kirk Dobbie (eds), The Exeter Book, The Anglo-Saxon Poetic Records, 3 (New York: Columbia University Press, 1936), p. 236, https://web.archive.org/web/20181206091232/http://ota.ox.ac.uk/desc/3009.
- Williamson, Craig (ed.), The Old English Riddles of the Exeter Book (Chapel Hill: University of North Carolina Press, 1977), p. 112 [no. 79].
- Muir, Bernard J. (ed.), The Exeter Anthology of Old English Poetry: An Edition of Exeter Dean and Chapter MS 3501, 2nd edn, 2 vols (Exeter: Exeter University Press, 2000).
- Foys, Martin and Stoll, Daniel (eds.) Old English Poetry in Facsimile Project (Center for the History of Print and Digital Culture, University of Wisconsin-Madison, 2019-).

=== Recordings ===
- Michael D. C. Drout, 'Riddle 83', Anglo-Saxon Aloud (19 November 2007) (performed from the Anglo-Saxon Poetic Records edition).
