= Exeter Book Riddle 60 =

Old English riddle

Exeter Book Riddle 60 (according to the numbering of the Anglo-Saxon Poetic Records) is one of the Old English riddles found in the later tenth-century Exeter Book. The riddle is usually solved as 'reed pen', although such pens were not in use in Anglo-Saxon times, rather being Roman technology; but it can also be understood as 'reed pipe'.

== Text ==
As edited by Krapp and Dobbie in the Anglo-Saxon Poetic Records series, Riddle 60 runs:

Ic wæs be sonde, sæwealle neah,
æt merefaroþe, minum gewunade
frumstaþole fæst; fea ænig wæs
monna cynnes, þæt minne þær
on anæde eard beheolde,
ac mec uhtna gehwam yð sio brune
lagufæðme beleolc. Lyt ic wende
þæt ic ær oþþe sið æfre sceolde
ofer meodubence muðleas sprecan,
wordum wrixlan. Þæt is wundres dæl,
on sefan searolic þam þe swylc ne conn,
hu mec seaxes ord ond seo swiþre hond,
eorles ingeþonc ond ord somod,
þingum geþydan, þæt ic wiþ þe sceolde
for unc anum twam ærendspræce
abeodan bealdlice, swa hit beorna ma
uncre wordcwidas widdor ne mænden.

I was along the sand, near the seawall, beside the sea-surge; [I] dwelled firmly rooted in my original place. Few were any of the race of men that beheld my dwelling place in wilderness, for every dawn the dark sea surrounded me with its enveloping waves. Little did I expect that I, sooner or later, ever would speak mouthless over mead-benches, exchange words. It is somewhat a wonder, complex in the mind, for him who cannot understand such, how the point of the knife and the right hand, man’s intention and the blade, worked me with purpose, so that I would boldly disclose a verbal message for us two alone, so that other men will not know the meaning of our conversation far and wide.

There has been some debate as to whether Riddle 60 is a text in its own right: it is followed by the poem The Husband's Message and has been read as the opening to that. Most scholars agree, however, that the two texts are separate.

== Sources ==
The text is usually thought to have been inspired by the second riddle in Symphosius's collection, whose answer is 'harundo' ('reed'). The same riddle also occurs in the Latin romance of Apollonius of Tyre:

Dulcis amica ripae, semper uicina profundis,
Suaue cano Musis; nigro perfusa colore,
Nuntia sum linguae digitis signata magistris.

Translation:

Sweet darling of the banks, always close to the depths,
sweetly I sing for the Muses; when drenched with black,
I am the tongue’s messenger by guiding fingers pressed.

== Interpretation ==
Riddle 60 is generally read alongside other Anglo-Saxon riddles about writing implements, as giving an insight into Anglo-Saxon attitudes to the craft of writing generally. However, it also provides interesting links to the language and style of the so-called Old English elegies, and has recently been read as a case-study in ecocritical readings of Old English poetry, as it explores complex interactions of different assemblages of species and processes of crafting.

== Digital Facsimile Edition and Translation ==
Foys, Martin and Smith, Kyle (eds.) Old English Poetry in Facsimile Project (Center for the History of Print and Digital Culture, University of Wisconsin-Madison, 2019-).

== Recordings ==
- Michael D. C. Drout, 'Riddle 60', performed from the Anglo-Saxon Poetic Records edition (9 November 2007).
