= Exeter Book Riddle 25 =

Old English riddle

Exeter Book Riddle 25 (according to the numbering of the Anglo-Saxon Poetic Records) is one of the Old English riddles found in the later 10th-century Exeter Book. Suggested solutions have included hemp, leek, onion, rosehip, mustard and phallus, but the consensus is that the solution is 'onion'.

== Text and translation ==
As edited by Krapp and Dobbie and translated by Megan Cavell, the riddle reads:

Ic eom wunderlicu wiht, wifum on hyhte,
neahbuendum nyt; nængum sceþþe
burgsittendra, nymþe bonan anum.
Staþol min is steapheah, stonde ic on bedde,
neoþan ruh nathwær. Neþeð hwilum
ful cyrtenu ceorles dohtor,
modwlonc meowle, þæt heo on mec gripeð,
ræseð mec on reodne, reafað min heafod,
fegeð mec on fæsten. Feleþ sona
mines gemotes, seo þe mec nearwað,
wif wundenlocc. Wæt bið þæt eage.

Translation:

I am a wondrous creature, a joy to women,
a help to neighbours; I harm none
of the city-dwellers, except for my killer.
My base is steep and high, I stand in a bed,
shaggy somewhere beneath. Sometimes ventures
the very beautiful daughter of a churl,
a maid proud in mind, so that she grabs hold of me,
rubs me to redness, ravages my head,
forces me into a fastness. Immediately she feels
my meeting, the one who confines me,
the curly-locked woman. Wet will be that eye.

== Interpretation ==
The riddle is noted for its double entendre, since to many readers the obvious solution to the riddle is 'penis'. It accordingly provides important evidence for attitudes to gender and sexuality in early medieval England.

== Editions ==
- Krapp, George Philip and Elliott Van Kirk Dobbie (eds), The Exeter Book, The Anglo-Saxon Poetic Records, 3 (New York: Columbia University Press, 1936), p. 193, https://web.archive.org/web/20181206091232/http://ota.ox.ac.uk/desc/3009.
- Williamson, Craig (ed.), The Old English Riddles of the Exeter Book (Chapel Hill: University of North Carolina Press, 1977).
- Muir, Bernard J. (ed.), The Exeter Anthology of Old English Poetry: An Edition of Exeter Dean and Chapter MS 3501, 2nd edn, 2 vols (Exeter: University of Exeter Press, 2000).
- Foys, Martin et al. (eds.) Old English Poetry in Facsimile Project, (Madison, WI: Center for the History of Print and Digital Culture, University of Wisconsin–Madison, 2019-). Online edition annotated and linked to digital facsimile, with a modern translation.

=== Recordings ===
- Michael D. C. Drout, 'Riddle 25', performed from the Anglo-Saxon Poetic Records edition (24 October 2007).
