= Lorsch riddles =

The Lorsch riddles, also known as the Aenigmata Anglica, are a collection of twelve hexametrical, early medieval Latin riddles that were anonymously written in the ninth century.

The absence of line breaks separating individual verses (among other things) show that they are possibly of English origin. The poems were heavily influenced by Aldhelm's Enigmata. None of the poems have a written solution, which has caused much debate over the answers to some of them; the solutions as given in Glore's edition are: 1. de homine/person; 2. de anima/soul; 3. de aqua/water; 4. de glacie/ice; 5. de cupa uinaria/wine-cup; 6. de niue/snow; 7. de castanea/chestnut; 8. de fetu/foetus; 9. de penna/feather; 10. de luminari/eternal light; 11. de tauro/bull; 12. de atramento/ink.

The riddles are preserved in only one manuscript (Vatican, Pal. Lat. 1753). The manuscript was written c. 800 in the Carolingian scriptorium of Lorsch Abbey, where it was rediscovered in 1753. It contains among a variety of grammatical texts the Aenigmata of Symphosius, the Enigmata of Aldhelm and a variety of prose and metrical texts by Boniface.

== Editions ==
- 'Aenigmata "lavreshamensia" [anigmata "anglica"]', ed. by Fr. Glorie, trans. by Karl J. Minst, in Tatuini omnia opera, Variae collectiones aenigmatum merovingicae aetatis, Anonymus de dubiis nominibus, Corpus christianorum: series latina, 133-133a, 2 vols (Turnholt: Brepols, 1968), I 345–58 [including German translation].

The Lorsch riddles have also been edited twice by Ernst Dümmler--once in 1879 and again in 1881.

== See also ==
- Anglo-Saxon riddles
