= Exeter Book Riddle 26 =

Old English riddle

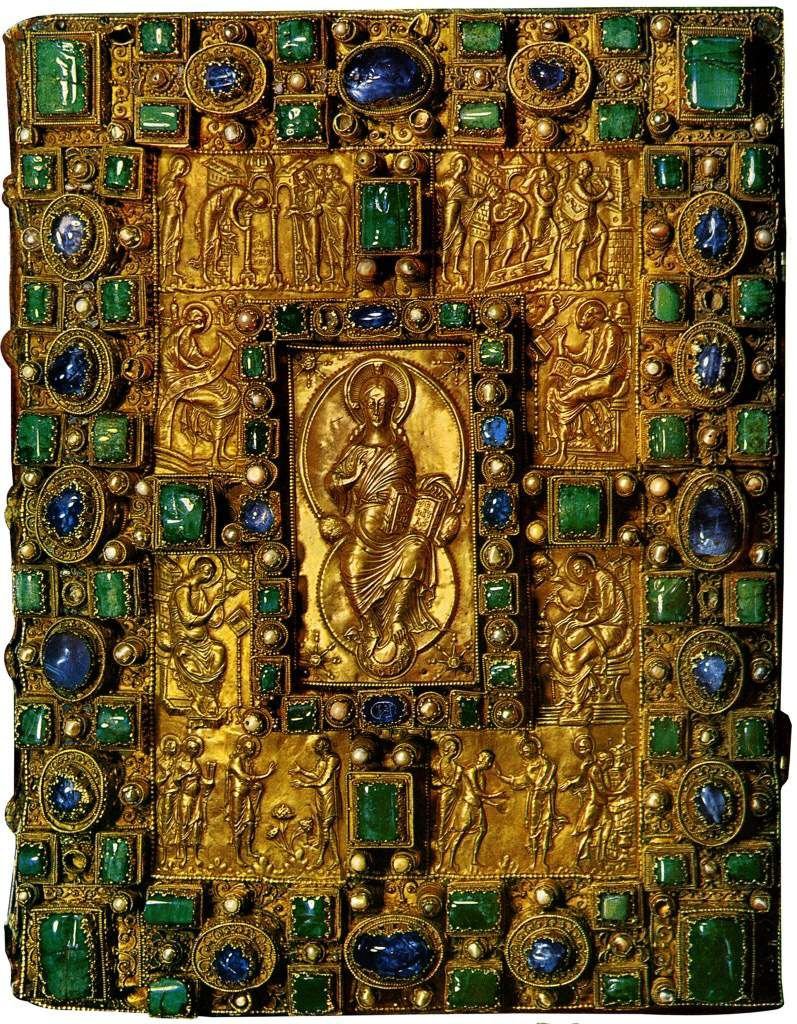
The ninth-century Codex Aureus of Sankt Emmeram, the kind of lavishly decorated Gospel-book which Riddle 26 may envisage.

Exeter Book Riddle 26 (according to the numbering of the Anglo-Saxon Poetic Records) is one of the Old English riddles found in the later tenth-century Exeter Book.

The riddle is almost unanimously solved as 'gospel book'.

== Text and translation ==
As edited by Krapp and Dobbie, and translated by Megan Cavell, the riddle reads:

Mec feonda sum feore besnyþede,
woruldstrenga binom, wætte siþþan,
dyfde on wætre, dyde eft þonan,
sette on sunnan, þær ic swiþe beleas
herum þam þe ic hæfde. Heard mec siþþan
snað seaxses ecg, sindrum begrunden;
fingras feoldan, ond mec fugles wyn
geond speddropum spyrede geneahhe,
ofer brunne brerd, beamtelge swealg,
streames dæle, stop eft on mec,
siþade sweartlast. Mec siþþan wrah
hæleð hleobordum, hyde beþenede,
gierede mec mid golde; forþon me gliwedon
wrætlic weorc smiþa, wire bifongen.
Nu þa gereno ond se reada telg
ond þa wuldorgesteald wide mære
dryhtfolca helm, nales dol wite.
Gif min bearn wera brucan willað,
hy beoð þy gesundran ond þy sigefæstran,
heortum þy hwætran ond þy hygebliþran,
ferþe þy frodran, habbaþ freonda þy ma,
swæsra ond gesibbra, soþra ond godra,
tilra ond getreowra, þa hyra tyr ond ead
estum ycað ond hy arstafum
lissum bilecgað ond hi lufan fæþmum
fæste clyppað. Frige hwæt ic hatte,
niþum to nytte. Nama min is mære,
hæleþum gifre ond halig sylf.

Translation:

A certain enemy robbed me of my life,
stole my world-strength; afterward he soaked me,
dunked me in water, dragged me out again,
set me in the sun, where I swiftly lost
the hairs that I had. Afterward the hard
edge of a knife, with all unevenness ground away, slashed me;
fingers folded, and the bird’s joy
[spread] over me with worthwhile drops, often made tracks,
over the bright border, swallowed tree-dye,
a portion of the stream, stepped again on me,
journeyed, leaving behind a dark track. Afterward a hero
encircled me with protective boards, covered me with hide,
garnished me with gold; therefore the wonderful
work of smiths glitters on me, surrounded by wire.
Now those ornaments and the red dye
and that wondrous dwelling widely worship
the protector of the people, not at all foolish in wisdom.
If the children of men wish to enjoy me,
they will be the more sound and the more victory-fast,
the bolder in heart and the more blithe in mind,
the wiser in spirit, they will have more friends,
dear and near, faithful and good,
upright and true; then their glory and prosperity
will increase with favour and lay down
goodwill and kindness and in the grasp of love
clasp firmly. Find what I am called,
useful to men. My name is famous,
handy to heroes and holy in itself.

== Editions, translations, and recordings ==
=== Editions ===
- Krapp, George Philip and Elliott Van Kirk Dobbie (eds), The Exeter Book, The Anglo-Saxon Poetic Records, 3 (New York: Columbia University Press, 1936), pp. 193–94.
- Williamson, Craig (ed.), The Old English Riddles of the Exeter Book (Chapel Hill: University of North Carolina Press, 1977).
- Muir, Bernard J. (ed.), The Exeter Anthology of Old English Poetry: An Edition of Exeter Dean and Chapter MS 3501, 2nd edn, 2 vols (Exeter: Exeter University Press, 2000).
- Foys, Martin et al. (eds.) Old English Poetry in Facsimile Project (Madison, WI: Center for the History of Print and Digital Culture, 2019-). Online edition annotated and linked to digital facsimile, with a modern translation.

=== Translations ===
- Jane Hirschfield, 'Some enemy took my life', in The Word Exchange: Anglo-Saxon Poems in Translation, ed. by Greg Delanty and Michael Matto (New York and London: Norton, 2011), pp. 164–67

=== Recordings ===
- Michael D. C. Drout, 'Riddle 26', Anglo-Saxon Aloud (24 October 2007) (performed from the Anglo-Saxon Poetic Records edition).
