= Exeter Book Riddle 27 =

Old English riddle

Exeter Book Riddle 27 (according to the numbering of the Anglo-Saxon Poetic Records) is one of the Old English riddles found in the later tenth-century Exeter Book. The riddle is almost universally solved as 'mead'.

== Text ==
As edited by Krapp and Dobbie in the Anglo-Saxon Poetic Records series, Riddle 27 runs:

Ic eom weorð werum, wide funden,
brungen of bearwum ond of burghleoþum,
of denum ond of dunum. Dæges mec wægun
feþre on lifte, feredon mid liste
under hrofes hleo. Hæleð mec siþþan
baþedan in dydene. Nu ic eom bindere
ond swingere, sona weorpere;
esne to eorþan hwilum ealdne ceorl.
Sona þæt on findeð, se þe mec fehð ongean
ond wið mægenþisan minre genæsteð,
þæt he hrycge sceal hrusan secan,
gif he unrædes ær ne geswiceð;
strengo bistolen, strong on spræce,
mægene binumen, nah his modes geweald,
fota ne folma. Frige hwæt ic hatte,
ðe on eorðan swa esnas binde
dole æfter dyntum be dæges leohte.

— George Philip Krapp and Elliott Van Kirk Dobbie (eds), The Exeter Book, The Anglo-Saxon Poetic Records, 3 (New York: Columbia University Press, 1936), p. 194, accessed from http://ota.ox.ac.uk/desc/3009 Archived 2018-12-06 at the Wayback Machine
Translation:

I am valuable/useful to men, found widely,
brought from groves and from mountain slopes,
from valleys and from hills. By day, feathers
carried me up high, took me skillfully
under the shelter of a roof. A man then
washed me in a container. Now I am a binder
and a striker; I bring a slave
to the ground, sometimes an old ceorl.
Immediately he discovers, he who goes
against me and contends against my strength,
that he shall meet the ground with his back,
unless he ceases from his folly early;
deprived of his strength, loud of speech,
his power bound, he has no control over his mind,
his feet, or his hands. Ask what I am called,
who thus binds slaves to the earth
with blows, by the light of day.

— Helen Price, 'A Hive of Activity: Realigning the Figure of the Bee in the Mead-Making network of Exeter Book Riddle 27', Postmedieval: A Journal of Medieval Cultural Studies (2015), 1-19; doi:10.1057/pmed.2015.1.

== Interpretation ==
Until recently there has been little work on this riddle. However, in recent years commentary has emphasised how it undermines the association with mead in Old English heroic poetry with martial masculinity. Other work has shown how the riddle not only elucidates Anglo-Saxons' relationships with bees, but has argued that the riddle enables us to chart the complex interrelations between humans and other ecological actors in the medieval past.

=== Editions ===
- Williamson, Craig (ed.), The Old English Riddles of the Exeter Book (Chapel Hill: University of North Carolina Press, 1977).
- Muir, Bernard J. (ed.), The Exeter Anthology of Old English Poetry: An Edition of Exeter Dean and Chapter MS 3501, 2nd edn, 2 vols (Exeter: Exeter University Press, 2000).
- Foys, Martin et al. (eds.),(Madison, WI: Center for the History of Print and Digital Culture, 2019-). Online edition annotated and linked to digital facsimile, with a modern translation: https://oepoetryfacsimile.org/?document=9363&document=9088

=== Recordings ===
- Michael D. C. Drout, 'Riddle 27', performed from the Anglo-Saxon Poetic Records edition (24 October 2007).
