= Exeter Book Riddle 5 =

Old English riddle

Exeter Book Riddle 5 (according to the numbering of the Anglo-Saxon Poetic Records) is one of the Old English riddles found in the later tenth-century Exeter Book. Its usual solution is 'shield', but other solutions, such as 'chopping board', are also possible.

== Text ==
As edited by Richard Marsden and rendered in a poetic translation by David Curzon, the poem reads:

Ic eom ānhaga īserne wund,
bille gebennad, beadoweorca sæd,
ecgum wērig. Oft ic wīg sēo,
frēcne feohtan, frōfre ne wēne,
þæt mē gēoc cyme gūðgewinnes,
ǣr ic mid ældum eal forwurðe,
ac mec hnossiað homera lāfe,
heardecg heoroscearp, hondweorc smiþa,
bītað in burgum. Ic ābīdan sceal
lāþran gemōtes. Nǣfre lǣcecynn
on folcstede findan meahte,
þāra þe mid wyrtum wunde gehǣlde,
ac mē ecga dolg ēacen weorðað
þurh dēaðslege dagum ond nihtum.

I am a monad gashed by iron,
savaged by the sword, worn by battles,
drained by blades. I often watch war,
fierce fighting. I trust in no comfort,
no solace to come from the trouble of conflict,
until my murder among men,
but on me beat hard hammers,
smiths' handiwork, deep bites
in my battlements. I wait for further
hateful conclaves. In no abode
can I discover the clan of doctors
who might heal my hurts with herbs,
but sword wounds widen in me
through deadly blows day and night.

A more literal, prose translation by S. A. J. Bradley runs

I am on my own, wounded by weapon of iron, scarred by sword, wearied from the actions of the fray, exhausted from the edges of the blade. Often I see battle and fight the foe. The consolation that relief from the toil of war shall come to me before I am completely done for amongst men, I do not expect; instead, the products of hammers, the hard-edged blade, bloodily sharp, the handiwork of the smiths, buffet and bite me within the strongholds. I must continue to await encounters yet more hostile. Never have I been able to find in town the kind of physician that has healed with herbs my wounds; instead, the sword-gashes upon me grow bigger through mortal blows by day and by night.

== Editions and translations ==
- Matthias Ammon, translation and commentary for Riddle 5, The Riddle Ages: Old English Riddles, Translations and Commentaries, ed. by Megan Cavell, with Matthias Ammon, Neville Mogford and Victoria Symons (Birmingham: University of Birmingham, 2020 [first publ. 2013])
- Foys, Martin et al. (eds.) Old English Poetry in Facsimile Project, (Madison, WI: Center for the History of Print and Digital Culture, 2019-). Online edition annotated and linked to digital facsimile, with a modern translation.

== Recordings ==
- Michael D. C. Drout, 'Riddle 5', performed from the Anglo-Saxon Poetic Records edition (19 October 2007).
