= Exeter Book Riddle 9 =

Old English riddle

Exeter Book Riddle 9 (according to the numbering of the Anglo-Saxon Poetic Records) is one of the Old English riddles found in the later tenth-century Exeter Book, in this case on folio 103r–v. The solution is believed to be 'cuckoo'. The riddle can be understood in its manuscript context as part of a sequence of bird-riddles.

== Text ==
As translated by Harriet Soper, Riddle 9 runs:

Mec on þissum dagum deadne ofgeafun
fæder ond modor; ne wæs me feorh þa gen,
ealdor in innan. Þa mec an ongon,
welhold mege, wedum þeccan,
heold ond freoþode, hleosceorpe wrah
swa arlice swa hire agen bearn,
oþþæt ic under sceate, swa min gesceapu wæron,
ungesibbum wearð eacen gæste.
Mec seo friþe mæg fedde siþþan,
oþþæt ic aweox, widdor meahte
siþas asettan. Heo hæfde swæsra þy læs
suna ond dohtra, þy heo swa dyde.

In these days my father and mother
gave me up for dead; there was no life in me yet,
vitality inside. Then began a certain one,
a most faithful kinswoman, to cover me with clothes,
kept and cared for me, wrapped me in a protective-garment,
as graciously as she did her own children,
until under a covering, as was my fate,
I became increased with spirit among the unrelated.
The fair kinswoman fed me afterwards,
until I grew and might wider
set my paths. She had fewer dear ones,
son and daughters, because she did so.

== Editions and translations ==
- Megan Cavell, translation and commentary for Riddle 9, The Riddle Ages: Early Medieval Riddles, Translations and Commentaries, ed. by Megan Cavell, with Matthias Ammon, Neville Mogford and Victoria Symons (Birmingham: University of Birmingham, 2020 [first publ. 2013])
- Foys, Martin et al. (eds.) Old English Poetry in Facsimile Project (Madison, WI: Center for the History of Print and Digital Culture, 2019-). Online edition annotated and linked to digital facsimile, with a modern translation.

== Recordings ==
- Michael D. C. Drout, 'Riddle 9', performed from the Anglo-Saxon Poetic Records edition (19 October 2007).
