= Exeter Book Riddle 24 =

Old English riddle

Exeter Book Riddle 24 (according to the numbering of the Anglo-Saxon Poetic Records) is one of the Old English riddles found in the later tenth-century Exeter Book. The riddle is one of a number to include runes as clues: they spell an anagram of the Old English word higoræ 'jay, magpie'. There has, therefore, been little debate about the solution.

== Text and translation ==
As edited by Williamson and translated by Stanton, the riddle reads:

Ic eom wunderlicu wiht— wræsne mine stefne:
hwilum beorce swa hund, hwilum blæte swa gat,
hwilum græde swa gos, hwilum gielle swa hafoc.
Hwilum ic onhyrge þone haswan earn,
guðfugles hleoþor; hwilum glidan reorde
muþe gemæne, hwilum mæwes song,
þær ic glado sitte. .ᚷ. (giefu) mec nemnað,
swylce .ᚫ. (æsc) ond .ᚱ. (rad) .ᚩ. (os) fullesteð,
.ᚻ. (hægl) ond .ᛁ. (is) Nu ic haten eom
swa þa siex stafas sweotule becnaþ.

Translation:

I am a wondrous creature—I vary my voice;
sometimes I bark like a dog, sometimes I bleat like a goat,
sometimes I cry like a goose, sometimes I shriek like a hawk.
Sometimes I imitate the grey eagle,
the sound of the war-bird; sometimes the kite’s voice
I speak with my mouth, sometimes the seagull’s song,
where I sit cheerful. G name me,
also Æ and R. O helps,
H and I. Now I am named
as the six letters clearly signify.

It is clear for metrical reasons that the runes were supposed to be sounded by their names, which are also words in their own right, so that in a sense the translation should also be something like:

where I sit cheerful. 'Gift' name me,
also 'ash-tree' and 'ride'. 'Pagan god[?]' helps,
'hail' and 'ice'. Now I am named
as the six letters clearly signify.

== Interpretation ==
The riddles alludes to the jay's proclivity for imitating other species, and it has been argued that the poem's soundplay also reflects this.

== Editions ==
- Krapp, George Philip and Elliott Van Kirk Dobbie (eds), The Exeter Book, The Anglo-Saxon Poetic Records, 3 (New York: Columbia University Press, 1936), pp. 192–93, https://web.archive.org/web/20181206091232/http://ota.ox.ac.uk/desc/3009.
- Williamson, Craig (ed.), The Old English Riddles of the Exeter Book (Chapel Hill: University of North Carolina Press, 1977), p. 82.
- Muir, Bernard J. (ed.), The Exeter Anthology of Old English Poetry: An Edition of Exeter Dean and Chapter MS 3501, 2nd edn, 2 vols (Exeter: Exeter University Press, 2000).
- Foys, Martin et al. (eds.) Old English Poetry in Facsimile Project, (Madison, WI: Center for the History of Print and Digital Culture, 2019-). Online edition annotated and linked to digital facsimile, with a modern translation.

=== Recordings ===
- Michael D. C. Drout, 'Riddle 24', performed from the Anglo-Saxon Poetic Records edition (23 October 2007).
