= Northumbrian Old English =

Dialect of Old English

- Native to: Great Britain
- Region: Roughly around what is now Northern England and Southern Scotland
- Ethnicity: Northumbrian
- Language family: Indo-European: Germanic; West Germanic; North Sea Germanic; Anglo-Frisian; Anglic; Anglian; Northumbrian Old English
- Early forms: Proto-Indo-European: Proto-Germanic

Language codes
- ISO 639-3: –

Northumbrian was a language now considered a dialect of Old English spoken in the Anglian Kingdom of Northumbria. Together with Mercian, Kentish and West Saxon, it forms one of the sub-categories of Old English devised and employed by modern scholars.

The dialect was spoken from the Humber, now within England, to the Firth of Forth, now within Scotland.

Most of the earliest surviving Old English texts were written in Northumbrian, such as Cædmon's Hymn (7th century) and Bede's Death Song (8th century). Other works, including the bulk of Cædmon's poetry, have been lost. Other examples of this dialect are the Runes on the Ruthwell Cross from the Dream of the Rood. Also in Northumbrian are the 9th-century Leiden Riddle and the late 10th century gloss of the Lindisfarne Gospels.

Today, the Scots language (including Ulster Scots) is descended from the Northumbrian language, as are modern Northumbrian, Cumbrian, Yorkshire and Lancashire dialects.

== History ==
Extent of Northumbria, c. 700 AD

Historical linguists recognise four distinct dialects of Old English: Northumbrian, Mercian, Kentish and West Saxon. The Northumbrian dialect was spoken in the Kingdom of Northumbria from the Humber to the River Mersey (mersey meaning border river) in northern England to the Firth of Forth in the Scottish Lowlands. Today, Modern Scots, Northumbrian, Cumbrian and Yorkshire dialects originate purely from Northumbrian, as well as forming the substrate of the since Mercian-influenced West Riding and Lancashire dialects. It was significantly different from the dialects spoken by other Kingdoms, especially that of West-Saxon (the dialect used for most modern studies of 'Old English'). Modern Standard English, on the other hand, has its origins in the Mercian dialect, which was the dialect most similar to Northumbrian.

The Angles brought their language (Englisc) to Northumbria in the 6th century AD, where it reached the modern-day Scottish Lowlands. This form of Northumbrian Old English was first recorded in poetry; e.g. Cædmon's Hymn c. 658-680), writings of the Venerable Bede (c. 700 AD) and the Leiden Riddle. The language is also attested in modern Scotland as a carved runic text, the Dream of the Rood, and on the Ruthwell Cross, c. 750 AD. Old Northumbria was later conquered by the Danes (867–883 AD) and from this day forth the language became influenced with Old Norse.

The area now in Southern Scotland, which was a part of the Kingdom of Northumbria from the 7th century, was invaded by Malcolm II of Scotland and became part of the kingdom of Alba following the Battle of Carham. The language north of the border later became known as Scottis or Scots.

An Old Northumbrian English translation of the Lindisfarne Gospels, originally written in Latin circa 715 AD, was made around 970 AD in Northumbrian.

Meanwhile, in parts of Galloway, Northumbrian and Brythonic were progressively displaced by Galwegian Gaelic, a process probably complete by the 11th century.

The anonymous author of the Northumbrian Cursor Mundi claimed southern English texts needed to be translated into northern dialects for people to fully understand what they were reading. Ralph Higden in 1364 described Northumbrian as incredibly difficult for southern natives to understand, believing the reason for this to be the "strange men an nations that speaketh stronglie" (i.e. the Scots) the region bordered. John of Trevisa spoke about nearby "strange men an aliens" in discussing northern English's alleged outlandishness, and in c. 1440 Osbern Bokenam wrote about Scots' influence on northern English in his Mappula Angliae.

By the 14th century, Lowland Scots became the main language of Scotland's Lowlands (excluding parts of Galloway, which still spoke Gaelic). Despite this, Northumbrian began to lose its significance in England by the 16th century. Northumbrian dialectical terms, accents, and manners of speaking were considered incorrect and inelegant to those in power, who were seated in the south of England. As England began to centralise its power in London and the south of England, texts in the midland and southern dialects became the de facto standard. A great number of letters, poems and newspaper articles were written in Northern English dialects throughout the 19th and 20th centuries; however, their use is declining in favour of Standard English. The modern Northumbrian dialect is currently promoted by organisations such as the Northumbrian Language Society and Northumbrian Words Project. Similarly, the closely related Cumbrian dialect is promoted by the Lakeland Dialect Society. The Yorkshire Dialect is promoted by the Yorkshire Dialect Society.

== Examples ==
The following witnesses to the language have added punctuation, diacritics for long vowels and palatalization, and italics representing expanded abbreviations and missing or illegible text.

=== Cædmon's Hymn ===
Nū sċylun herġan ‖ hefaenrīċaes uard,
metudæs maecti ‖ end his mōdġidanc,
uerc uuldurfadur, ‖ suē hē uundra ġihuaes,
ēċi dryctin ‖ ōr āstelidæ.
Hē a̅e̅rist sċōp ‖ aelda barnum
heben til hrōfe, ‖ hāleġ sċepend.
Thā middunġeard, ‖ moncynnæs uard,
ēċi dryctin ‖ æfter tīadæ,
fīrum foldu, ‖ frēa allmectiġ.

=== Bede's Death Song ===
Fore thēm ne̅i̅dfaerae ‖ na̅e̅niġ uuiurthit
thoncsnottura, ‖ than him tharf sīe
tō ymbhyċġġannae ‖ a̅e̅r his hiniongae
huaet his gāstae ‖ gōdaes aeththa yflaes
aefter dēothdaeġe ‖ do̅e̅mid uueorthae.

=== The Leiden Riddle ===
Mec se uēta uong, ‖ uundrum frēoriġ,
ob his innaðae ‖ a̅e̅rest cændæ.
Ni uaat iċ mec biuorthæ ‖ uullan flīusum,
hērum ðerh hēhcraeft, ‖ hyġiðoncum mīn.
Uundnae mē ni bīað ueflæ, ‖ ni iċ uarp hafæ,
ni ðerih ðrēatun ġiðraec ‖ ðrēt mē hlimmith,
ne mē hrūtendu ‖ hrīsil sċelfath,
ni mec ōuana ‖ aam sċeal cnyssa.
Uyrmas mec ni āuēfun ‖ uyrdi craeftum,
ðā ði ġeolu gōdueb ‖ ġeatum fraetuath.
Uil mec huethrae sua̅e̅ðēh ‖ uīdæ ofaer eorðu
hātan mith heliðum ‖ hyhtliċ ġiuǣde;
ni ano̅e̅ġu nō iċ mē aeriġfaerae ‖ eġsan brōgum,
ðēh ði numen sīæ ‖ nīudlicae ob cocrum.

=== Ruthwell Cross inscription ===
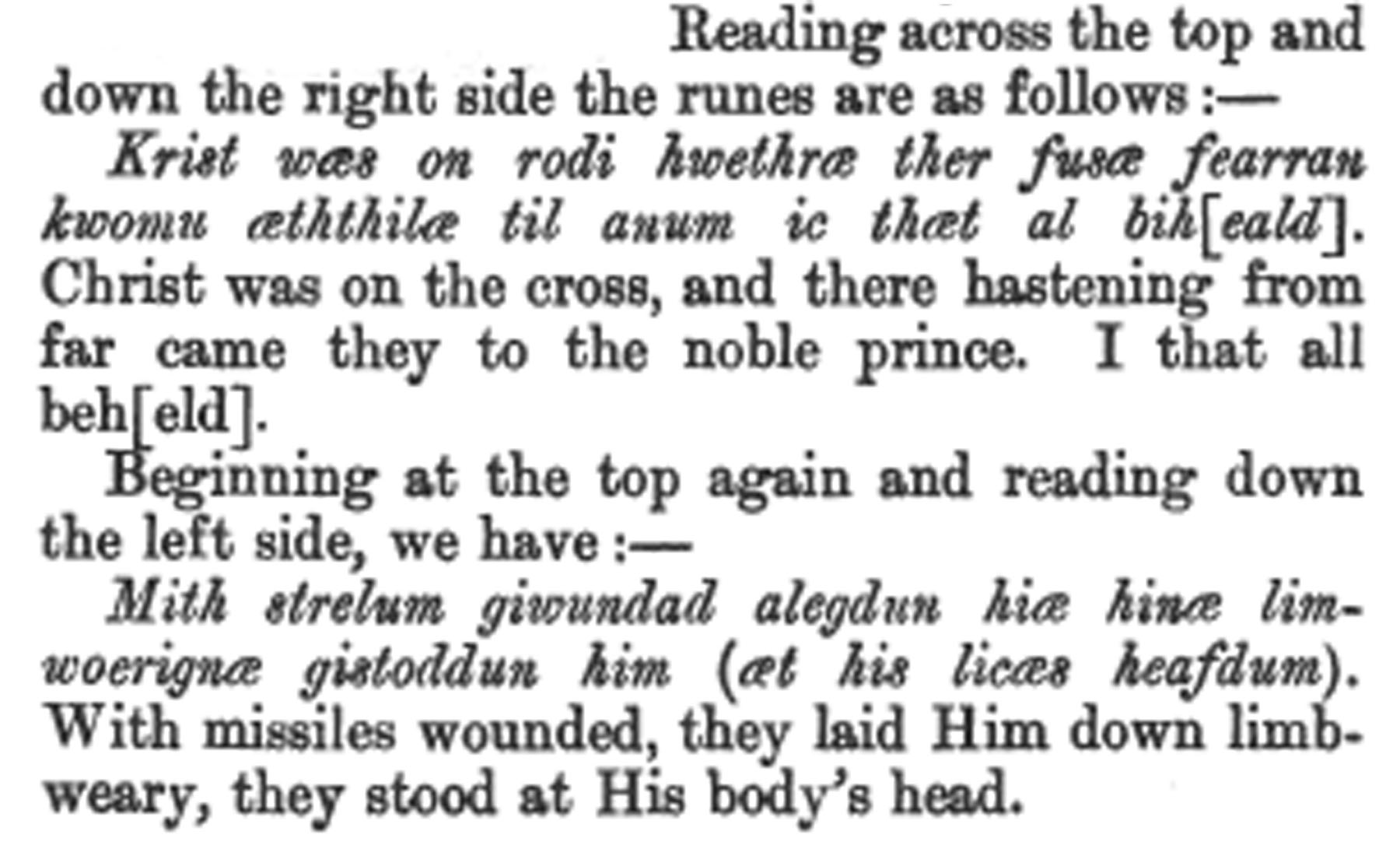
Translation of Ruthwell Cross inscription

Transcription notes: ġ = ᚷ; g = ᚸ; ħ = ᛇ; c = ᚳ; k = ᛣ/ᛤ; e͜a = ᛠ; ŋ = ᛝ. Many aspects of this transcription are subject to debate, due to the highly weathered condition of the original inscription.

Side 1:

Ġeredæ hinæ God almeħttiġ ‖ þā hē walde on galgu ġistiga,
modiġ fore... ‖ men bug...

... ic riicnæ kyniŋc,
he͜afunæs hlāfard ‖ hælda ic ni darstæ
bismæradun uŋket men ba ætgadre ‖ ic wæs miþ blodi bistemid...

Side 2:

Krist wæs on rōdi,
hweþræ þēr fūsæ ‖ fe͜arran kwōmu
æþþilæ til ānum ‖ ic þæt al biheald.
Sār ic wæs miþ sorgum ġidrœ̄fd ‖ hnag...

Miþ strēlum ġiwundad
aleġdun hīæ hinæ limwœ̄riġnæ ‖ gistoddun him æt his līcæs heafdum,
bihe͜aldun hīæ þēr...

=== The Lord's Prayer ===
The following version of the Lord's Prayer is taken from the late 10th-century gloss of the Lindisfarne Gospels:

Fader ūsær, ðū arð in heofnum.
Sīe ġehālgad noma ðīn.
Tōcymeð rīċ ðīn.
Sīe willo ðīn,
suǣ is in heofne ⁊ in eorðo.
Hlāf ūserne oferwistlīċ sel ūs tōdæġ
⁊ forġef ūs sċylda ūsra,
suǣ uo̅e̅ forġefon sċyldgum ūsum,
⁊ ne inlǣd ūsih in costunge,
ah ġefriġ ūsich from yfle.
