= Exeter Book Riddle 7 =

Old English riddle

Exeter Book Riddle 7 (according to the numbering of the Anglo-Saxon Poetic Records) is one of the Old English riddles found in the later tenth-century Exeter Book, in this case on folio 103r. The solution is believed to be 'swan' and the riddle is noted as being one of the Old English riddles whose solution is most widely agreed on. The riddle can be understood in its manuscript context as part of a sequence of bird-riddles.

== Text ==
As edited by Richard Marsden, and translated by Elaine Treharne, Riddle 7 runs:

Hrægl mīn swīgað, þonne ic hrūsan trede,
oþþe þā wīc būge, oþþe wado drēfe.
Hwīlum mec āhebbað ofer hæleþa byht
hyrste mīne, ond þēos hēa lyft,
ond mec þonne wīde wolcna strengu
ofer folc byreð. Frætwe mīne
swōgað hlūde ond swinsiað,
torhte singað, þonne ic getenge ne bēom
flōde ond foldan, fērende gǣst.

My garment is silent when I tread upon the earth
or reside in my dwelling or stir up the waters.
Sometimes my apparel and this high air
lift me over the dwellings of men,
and the strength of the clouds carries me far
over the people. My ornaments
resound loudly and make music,
sing clearly, when I am not resting on
water and ground, a travelling spirit.

== Editions and translations ==
- Jessica Lockhart, translation and commentary for Riddle 7, The Riddle Ages: Early Medieval Riddles, Translations and Commentaries, ed. by Megan Cavell, with Matthias Ammon, Neville Mogford and Victoria Symons (Birmingham: University of Birmingham, 2020 [first publ. 2013])
- Foys, Martin et al. (eds.) Old English Poetry in Facsimile Project, (Madison, WI: Center for the History of Print and Digital Culture, 2019-). Online edition annotated and linked to digital facsimile, with a modern translation.

== Recordings ==
- Michael D. C. Drout, 'Riddle 7', performed from the Anglo-Saxon Poetic Records edition (19 October 2007).
