= Exeter Book Riddle 30 =

Old English riddle

Exeter Book Riddle 30 (according to the numbering of the Anglo-Saxon Poetic Records) is one of the Old English riddles found in the later tenth-century Exeter Book. Since the suggestion of F. A. Blackburn in 1901, its solution has been agreed to be the Old English word bēam, understood both in its primary sense 'tree' but also in its secondary sense 'cross'.

The riddle is particularly important because it actually appears twice in the Exeter Book, on folios 108r (numbered 30a in the Anglo-Saxon Poetic Records) and 122v (numbered 30b). Parts of 30b are missing due to burn damage to the manuscript. This makes Riddle 30 a rare example of an Old English poem surviving in two copies (in this case both by the same scribe). The copies are fairly different, and these differences seem more likely to have arisen from scribal rather than memorial transmission. In the assessment of Roy M. Liuzza, '30b is rhetorically a decidedly more forceful poem than 30a'.

== Text ==
As transcribed by Roy M. Liuzza and translated by Pirkko Koppinen, Riddle 30's text is thus:

30a (f. 108r)

Ic eom leg bysig lace mid winde
bewunden mid wuldre wedre gesomnad
fus forð weges fyre gebysgad
bearu blowende byrnende gled
ful oft mec gesiþas sendað æfter hondum
þat mec weras ⁊ wif wlonce cyssað
þoñ ic mec on hæbbe ⁊ hi on hin gað to me
monige mid miltse þær ic monnum sceal
ycan up cyme eadig nesse :⁊

Translation:
English

I am busy with fire, fight with the wind,
wound around with glory, united with storm,
eager for the journey, agitated by fire;
[I am] a blooming grove, a burning ember.
Very often companions send me from hand to hand
so that proud men and women kiss me.
When I exalt myself and they bow to me,
many with humility, there I shall
bring increasing happiness to humans.

30b (f. 122v)

Ic eom lig bysig lace mid winde
w . . . [r] . . . . . . dre ge somnad
fus forð weges fyre gemylted
[bear] . blowende byrnende gled
ful oft mec gesiþas sendað æfter hondū
þær mec weras ⁊ wif wlonce gecyssað
þoñ ic mec onhæbbe hi on hnigað to me
modge miltsum swa ic mongum sceal
ycan up cyme eadignesse :⁊

Translation:
English

I am busy with fire, fight with the wind,
[…] united […],
eager for the journey, consumed by fire;
[I am] a blooming […], a burning ember.
Very often companions send me from hand to hand
where proud men and women kiss me.
When I exalt myself, high-spirited [ones]
bow to me with humility, in this way I shall
bring increasing happiness to many.

== Editions ==
- Foys, Martin et al. Old English Poetry in Facsimile Project (Center for the History of Print and Digital Culture, University of Wisconsin-Madison, 2019-).
- Krapp, George Philip and Elliott Van Kirk Dobbie (eds), The Exeter Book, The Anglo-Saxon Poetic Records, 3 (New York: Columbia University Press, 1936), pp. 195-96, 224-25, http://ota.ox.ac.uk/text/3009.html.
- Williamson, Craig (ed.), The Old English Riddles of the Exeter Book (Chapel Hill: University of North Carolina Press, 1977), no. 28.
- Muir, Bernard J. (ed.), The Exeter Anthology of Old English Poetry: An Edition of Exeter Dean and Chapter MS 3501, 2nd edn, 2 vols (Exeter: Exeter University Press, 2000).

=== Recordings ===
- Michael D. C. Drout, 'Riddle 30a', performed from the Anglo-Saxon Poetic Records edition (9 November 2007).
- Michael D. C. Drout, 'Riddle 30b', performed from the Anglo-Saxon Poetic Records edition (9 November 2007).
