= Exeter Book Riddle 12 =

Old English riddle

Exeter Book Riddle 12 (according to the numbering of the Anglo-Saxon Poetic Records) is one of the Old English riddles found in the later tenth-century Exeter Book. Its solution is accepted to be 'ox/ox-hide' (though variations on this theme, focusing on leather objects, have been proposed). The riddle has been described as 'rather a cause celebre in the realm of Old English poetic scholarship, thanks to the combination of its apparently sensational, and salacious, subject matter with critical issues of class, sex, and gender'. The riddle is also of interest because of its reference to an enslaved person, possibly ethnically British.

== Text and translation ==
As edited by Krapp and Dobbie, the riddle reads:

Fotum ic fere, foldan slite,
grene wongas, þenden ic gæst bere.
Gif me feorh losað, fæste binde
swearte Wealas, hwilum sellan men.
Hwilum ic deorum drincan selle
beorne of bosme, hwilum mec bryd triedeð
felawlonc fotum, hwilum feorran broht
wonfeax Wale wegeð ond þyð,
dol druncmennen deorcum nihtum,
wæteð in wætre, wyrmeð hwilum
fægre to fyre; me on fæðme sticaþ
hygegalan hond, hwyrfeð geneahhe,
swifeð me geond sweartne. Saga hwæt ic hatte,
þe ic lifgende lond reafige
ond æfter deaþe dryhtum þeowige.

Translation:

I travel by foot, trample the ground,
the green fields, as long as I carry a spirit [i.e. as long as I am living].
If I lose my life, I bind fast
dark Welshmen; sometimes better men.
On occasion, I give a brave warrior drink
from within me, sometimes a very stately bride treads
her foot on me; sometimes a dark-haired slave-girl
brought far from Wales shakes and presses me,
some stupid, drunken maidservant, on dark nights
she moistens with water, she warms for a while
by the pleasant fire; on my breast she thrusts
a wanton hand and moves about frequently,
then sweeps me within the blackness. Say what I am called
who, living ravages the land,
and after death, serves the multitudes.

== Interpretations ==
The riddle is noted particularly for its rare (and unflattering) depiction of Wealas, a word which either means 'Brittonic people' or 'slaves', or both (Wealas is rendered in Treharne's translation above as 'Welshmen' and the rare but related term wale 'slave-girl ... from Wales'); the precise meanings here have occasioned extensive discussion.

The riddle is also noted for its implicit portrayal of sexual desire, which is rare in Old English poetry: the riddle seems to depict a slave and/or ethnically Brittonic person fashioning an object from boiled leather, but certainly does so in ways that evoke sexual activity.

There are a number of early medieval Latin riddles on oxen which stand as analogues to this one.

== Editions ==
- Krapp, George Philip and Elliott Van Kirk Dobbie (eds), The Exeter Book, The Anglo-Saxon Poetic Records, 3 (New York: Columbia University Press, 1936), p. 186, https://web.archive.org/web/20181206091232/http://ota.ox.ac.uk/desc/3009.
- Williamson, Craig (ed.), The Old English Riddles of the Exeter Book (Chapel Hill: University of North Carolina Press, 1977).
- Muir, Bernard J. (ed.), The Exeter Anthology of Old English Poetry: An Edition of Exeter Dean and Chapter MS 3501, 2nd edn, 2 vols (Exeter: Exeter University Press, 2000).
- Foys, Martin et al. (eds.) Old English Poetry in Facsimile Project, (Madison, WI: Center for the History of Print and Digital Culture, 2019-). Online edition annotated and linked to digital facsimile, with a modern translation.

=== Recordings ===
- Michael D. C. Drout, 'Riddle 12', performed from the Anglo-Saxon Poetic Records edition (19 October 2007).
