= Exeter Book Riddle 44 =

Old English riddle

Exeter Book Riddle 44 (according to the numbering of the Anglo-Saxon Poetic Records) is one of the Old English riddles found in the later tenth-century Exeter Book. Its solution is accepted to be 'key'. However, the description evokes a penis; as such, Riddle 44 is noted as one of a small group of Old English riddles that engage in sexual double entendre, and thus provides rare evidence for Anglo-Saxon attitudes to sexuality.

== Text and translation ==
As edited by Krapp and Dobbie, the riddle reads:

Wrætlic hongað bi weres þeo,
frean under sceate. Foran is þyrel.
Bið stiþ ond heard, stede hafað godne;
þonne se esne his agen hrægl
ofer cneo hefeð, wile þæt cuþe hol
mid his hangellan heafde gretan
þæt he efenlang ær oft gefylde.

Translation:

A curious thing hangs by a man's thigh,
under the lap of its lord. In its front it is pierced,
it is stiff and hard, it has a good position.
When the man lifts his own garment
above his knee, he intends to greet
with the head of his hanging object that familiar hole
which is the same length, and which he has often filled before.

== Editions ==
- Krapp, George Philip and Elliott Van Kirk Dobbie (eds), The Exeter Book, The Anglo-Saxon Poetic Records, 3 (New York: Columbia University Press, 1936), pp. 204-5, https://web.archive.org/web/20181206091232/http://ota.ox.ac.uk/desc/3009.
- Williamson, Craig (ed.), The Old English Riddles of the Exeter Book (Chapel Hill: University of North Carolina Press, 1977), no. 42.
- Muir, Bernard J. (ed.), The Exeter Anthology of Old English Poetry: An Edition of Exeter Dean and Chapter MS 3501, 2nd edn, 2 vols (Exeter: Exeter University Press, 2000).
- Foys, Martin et al. (eds.) Old English Poetry in Facsimile Project, (Madison, WI: Center for the History of Print and Digital Culture, 2019-). Online edition annotated and linked to digital facsimile, with a modern translation.

=== Recordings ===
- Michael D. C. Drout, 'Riddle 44', performed from the Anglo-Saxon Poetic Records edition (29 October 2007).
