= Bede's Death Song =

Old English poem

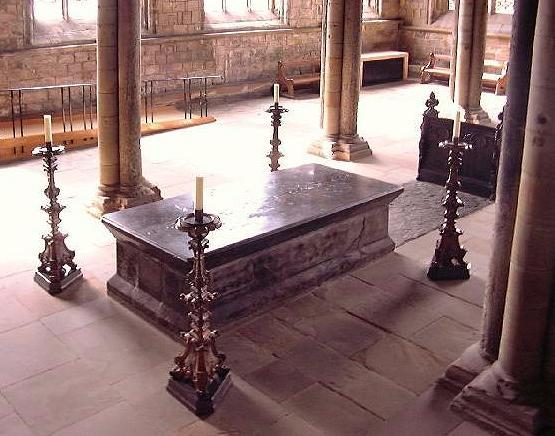
Bede's tomb in Durham Cathedral

Bede's Death Song is the editorial name given to a five-line Old English poem, supposedly the final words of the Venerable Bede. It is, by far, the Old English poem that survives in the largest number of manuscripts — 35 or 45 (mostly later medieval manuscripts copied on the Continent). It is found in both Northumbrian and West Saxon dialects.

== Attribution to Bede ==
Bede died on Thursday, 26 May 735 (Ascension Day) on the floor of his cell, singing Glory be to the Father and to the Son and to the Holy Spirit and was buried at Jarrow. Cuthbert, a disciple of Bede's, wrote a letter to a Cuthwin (of whom nothing else is known), describing Bede's last days and his death. According to Cuthbert, Bede fell ill, "with frequent attacks of breathlessness but almost without pain", before Easter. On the Tuesday, two days before Bede died, his breathing became worse and his feet swelled. He continued to dictate to a scribe, however, and despite spending the night awake in prayer he dictated again the following day. At three o'clock, according to Cuthbert, he asked for a box of his to be brought, and distributed among the priests of the monastery "a few treasures" of his: "some pepper, and napkins, and some incense". That night he dictated a final sentence to the scribe, a boy named Wilberht, and died soon afterwards. (Note: The account of Cuthbert does not make entirely clear whether Bede died before midnight or after. However, by the reckoning of Bede's time, passage from the old day to the new occurred at sunset, not midnight, and Cuthbert is clear that he died after sunset. Thus, while his box was brought at three o'clock Wednesday afternoon the 25th, by the time of the final dictation it was already Thursday the 26th.") Cuthbert's letter also relates a five-line poem in the vernacular that Bede composed on his deathbed, known as "Bede's Death Song". But the poem's attribution to Bede is not absolutely certain—not all manuscripts name Bede as the author, and the ones that do are of later origin than those that do not.

== Text ==
Recorded in both Northumbrian and West Saxon, as edited in the Anglo-Saxon Poetic Records series (with ‖ representing a medial caesura) the poem reads:

=== Northumbrian version ===
Fore thaem neidfaerae ‖ naenig uuiurthit
thoncsnotturra, ‖ than him tharf sie
to ymbhycggannae ‖ aer his hiniongae
huaet his gastae ‖ godaes aeththa yflaes
aefter deothdaege ‖ doemid uueorthae.

=== West Saxon version ===
For þam nedfere ‖ næni wyrþeþ
þances snotera, ‖ þonne him þearf sy
to gehicgenne ‖ ær his heonengange
hwæt his gaste ‖ godes oþþe yfeles
æfter deaþe heonon ‖ demed weorþe.

=== Modern English translation ===
Literally: Before the necessary journey, no-one will be wiser in thought than he needs to be, to think, before he goes from here, about what of his spirit, of good or of evil, will be judged after his death-day.

In a literal translation by Leo Shirley-Price, the text reads as:

Before setting forth on that inevitable journey, none is wiser than the man who considers—before his soul departs hence—what good or evil he has done, and what judgement his soul will receive after its passing.

=== Modern dialect of the counties of Durham and Northumberland ===
A translation into the modern Durham and Northumberland dialect by Richard Oliver Heslop.

Afore thor need-fare ‖ yen is nivvor mair
wise in thowt ‖ than he owt
think what he can ‖ on his way to gan
what tiv his ghaist ‖ o good or ill maist
after his deeth day ‖ doom then may say.
