= Leiden Riddle =

Old English riddle

The "Leiden Riddle" is an Old English riddle (which also survives in a similar form in the Exeter Book known as Exeter Book Riddle 33 or 35). It is noteworthy for being one of the earliest attested pieces of English poetry; one of only a small number of representatives of the Northumbrian dialect of Old English; one of only a relatively small number of Old English poems to survive in multiple manuscripts; and evidence for the translation of the Latin poetry of Aldhelm into Old English.

== Text ==
Aldhelm’s Lorica

Roscida me genuit gelido de uiscere tellus;
Non sum setigero lanarum uellere facta,
Licia nulla trahunt nec garrula fila resultant
Nec crocea Seres texunt lanugine uermes
Nec radiis carpor duro nec pectine pulsor;
Et tamen en ‘uestis’ uulgi sermone uocabor.
Spicula non uereor longis exempta faretris.

Translation:
English

The damp earth produced me from her cold womb;
I am not made from the rasping fleece of wool,
no leashes pull [me] nor garrulous threads reverberate,
nor do Oriental worms weave [me] with yellow down,
nor am I plucked by shuttles nor beaten by the hard reed;
and yet I will be called a coat in the common speech.
I do not fear arrows pulled out from long quivers.

The Leiden Riddle

Mec se uēta uong, · uundrum frēorig,
ob his innaðae · a̅e̅rest cændæ.
Ni ua̅a̅t ic mec biuorthæ · uullan fli̅u̅sum,
hērum ðerh hēhcraeft, · hygiðonc....
Uundnae mē ni bīað ueflæ, · ni ic uarp hafæ,
ni ðerih ðreatun giðraec · ðrēt mē hlimmith,
ne mē hrūtendu · hrīsil scelfath,
ni mec ōuana · a̅a̅m sceal cnyssa.
Uyrmas mec ni āuēfun · uyrdi craeftum,
ðā ði geolu gōdueb · geatum fraetuath.
Uil mec huethrae sua̅e̅ ðēh uīdæ ofaer eorðu
hātan mith hæliðum · hyhtlic giuǣde;
ni ano̅e̅gun ic mē a̅e̅rigfaerae · egsan brōgum,
ðēh ði n[...] [...]n sīæ · nīudlicae ob cocrum.

Translation:
English

The wet ground, incredibly cold,
first produced me from its innards.
I do not know myself in my mind's considerations
to be made with wool from fleeces, from hair through great skill.
There are no woofs woven in me, nor do I have warps,
nor does thread resound in me through the thrusting of pressers,
nor do whizzing shuttles shake in me,
nor must the sley knock me anywhere.
Worms did not weave me with the skills of the fates,
those which adorn the costly yellow cloth with decorations.
But nevertheless, widely across the earth,
I am wont to be called desirable clothing amongst heroes.
Nor do I dread terror from the peril of a flight of arrows,
though it might be taken eagerly from the quivers.

Exeter Book Riddle 33/35

Mec se wǣta wong, · wundrum frēorig,
of his innaþe · ǣrist cende.
Ne wāt ic mec beworhtne · wulle flȳsum,
hǣrum þurh hēahcræft, · hygeþoncum mīn.
Wundene mē ne bēoð wefle, · ne ic wearp hafu,
ne þurh þreata geþræcu · þrǣd mē ne hlimmeð,
ne æt mē hrūtende · hrīsil scrīþeð,
ne mec ōhwonan · sceal ām cnyssan.
Wyrmas mec ne āwǣfan · wyrda cræftum,
þā þe geolo gōdwebb · geatwum frætwað.
Wile mec mon hwæþre seþēah · wīde ofer eorþan
hātan for hæleþum · hyhtlic gewǣde.
Saga sōðcwidum, · searoþoncum glēaw,
wordum wīsfæst, · hwæt þis gewǣde sȳ.

Translation:
English

The wet ground, incredibly cold,
first produced me from its innards.
I do not know myself in my mind's considerations
to be made with wool from fleeces, from hair through great skill.
There are no woofs woven in me, nor do I have warps,
nor does thread resound in me through the thrustings of pressers,
nor does whizzing shuttle glide in me,
nor must the sley knock me anywhere.
Worms did not weave me with the skills of the fates,
those which adorn the costly yellow cloth with decorations.
But nevertheless, widely across the earth,
I am wont to be called desirable clothing amongst heroes.
Person clever in your ideas, wise in your words,
say in truthful utterance what this clothing might be.

== Manuscript ==
The Leiden Riddle is attested in MS Leiden VLQ 106, Leiden University Library, where it accompanies the Latin text on which it is based. The manuscript was described by Herbert Dean Merritt thus:

25 leaves, Riddles of Symphosius and Aldhelm, ninth century. At the end of the Riddles, folio 25v, is the well-known Leiden Riddle in Old English. On folio 10r, in a space [xviii] at the end of chapter headings, are written in the hand of the text the Old English glosses to nymph names.

The manuscript was probably copied in western France, perhaps at Fleury Abbey. The riddle was added after the completion of the main contents, fairly certainly at Fleury Abbey, in the tenth century, but the language of the text is older, of the eighth century. It was already hard to read by the earlier nineteenth century, and was further damaged by the librarian, Willem George Pluygers, who in 1864 applied reagents to the text in an attempt to make it more legible.

== Literary origins and character of the text ==
The West Saxon aristocrat, monk, scholar, and poet Aldhelm (c. 639–709) composed, among many other works, a set of one hundred hexametrical 'enigmata' or 'enigmas', inspired by the so-called Riddles of Symphosius. The thirty-third was Lorica ('corselet'). This was translated into Old English, and first witnessed in the Northumbrian dialect of Old English as the Leiden Riddle; the language is of the seventh or eighth century. Unusually, the riddle is also attested, in West Saxon, among the Old English riddles of the later tenth-century Exeter Book, where it is number 33 or 35 (depending on the edition consulted). Apart from differences in language caused by dialect and date, and damage to the Leiden manuscript, the texts are the identical on all but a couple of points.

The translation has been praised for its complexity and wit. In the assessment of Thomas Klein,

The spirit behind this rewritten riddle may be best exemplified by a pun in the penultimate line of the Exeter Book version. In the manner of other riddles, the riddle dares us to find the solution, calling the reader searoþoncum gleaw, 'clever with cunning thoughts'. As a separate word, searo has several competing senses. It may designate either a 'device' or the intellectual power that created such a device. But more specifically, searo can mean 'armour'—so the pun reads, 'clever with thoughts of armour'.

== Linguistic origins and character of the text ==
The Leiden Riddle is an unusually archaic example of Old English, and one of relatively few representatives of its Northumbrian dialect. This is easily shown through comparison between the Leiden Riddle and the later, West Saxon copy in the Exeter Book:

The differences between these two copies are ample testament to the distances in time and space that separate them. Several are relatively superficial, representing different conventions for the spelling of what was in fact the same sound: eg. Leiden's typically early ⟨u⟩, ⟨th⟩ and ⟨b⟩, frequently appearing for Exeter ⟨w⟩ (the Anglo-Saxon letter 'wynn'), ⟨þ⟩ and ⟨f⟩. Reflecting a distinct pronunciation are the Leiden forms ueta (1), herum (4) and auefun (9), whose ⟨e⟩ versus Exeter ⟨æ⟩ represents one of the most important dialect divisions between West Saxon and Anglian; similarly significant are the vowels in, e.g., Leiden heh (4) rather than heah, uarp (5) as opposed to wearp, biað (5) next to beoð, and so on. In general, there is a far greater range of unaccented vowels in Leiden, another feature of an early date (before these merged; compare, e.g., innaðae (2) with innaðe, hlimmith (6) with hlimmeð); and some important differences in inflexional endings (viz. Leiden's early preterite plural auefun (9), Exeter's late awæfan).

== Editions and Translations ==
- Foys, Martin et al. (eds.) Old English Poetry in Facsimile Project (Madison, WI: Center for the History of Print and Digital Culture, 2019-). Online edition annotated and linked to digital facsimile, with a modern translation.

== Recordings ==
- Michael D. C. Drout, 'Riddle 35', performed from the Anglo-Saxon Poetic Records edition (25 October 2007).
