= George Philip Krapp =

American English scholar

- Born: September 1, 1872; Cincinnati, Ohio
- Died: April 22, 1934 (aged 61)
- Spouse: Elisabeth Christina von Saltza
- Children: Robert M. Adams
- Relatives: Carl Frederick von Saltza (father-in-law); Philip von Saltza (brother-in-law)

Academic background
- Education: Wittenberg University (BA); Johns Hopkins University (PhD)

Academic work
- Discipline: English language
- Institutions: University of Cincinnati; Columbia University
- Notable works: Anglo-Saxon Poetic Records

George Philip Krapp (1872–1934) was a scholar of the English language. Born in Cincinnati, he graduated from Wittenberg College in 1894 and received a PhD from Johns Hopkins University in 1899. His doctoral thesis was on the poem The Legend of the Purgatory of St. Patrick.

In 1897 Krapp joined the faculty of Columbia University, becoming professor of English at the University of Cincinnati (1908–1910) before gaining the same title at Columbia (1910–1934).

His best-known achievement is conceiving and in large part undertaking the six-volume Anglo-Saxon Poetic Records edition (begun in 1931, and concluded by Krapp's collaborator Elliott Van Kirk Dobbie in 1953). Krapp is also noted for his books Modern English: Its Growth and Present Use (1909), in which he argued "that 'good English' was not determined by the conformity to grammatical laws, but by the common use of language"; and The English Language in America (1925), described by Henry Blake Fuller as "detailing the adventures of an old language in a new country" and a book that "contravenes many of our favorite notions about ourselves and our speech". He wrote six children's books about subjects such as "the Civil War, the Great Lakes, the frontier, and country life".

In June 1924, Krapp wrote in The American Mercury that several words in African American dialect were from common English usage that lingered in "Negro speech" while becoming archaic elsewhere. The article was noted in Monroe Work's Negro Yearbook 1925-1926 (page 45) and elsewhere.

== Legacy ==
Following Krapp's death, his widow donated 500 of his books to Columbia University. His wife, Elisabeth Christina von Saltza, was the daughter of Swedish painter Carl Frederick von Saltza, and his brother-in-law was painter Philip von Saltza. His son was literary scholar Robert M. Adams.
