= Symphosius =

Roman writer and poet

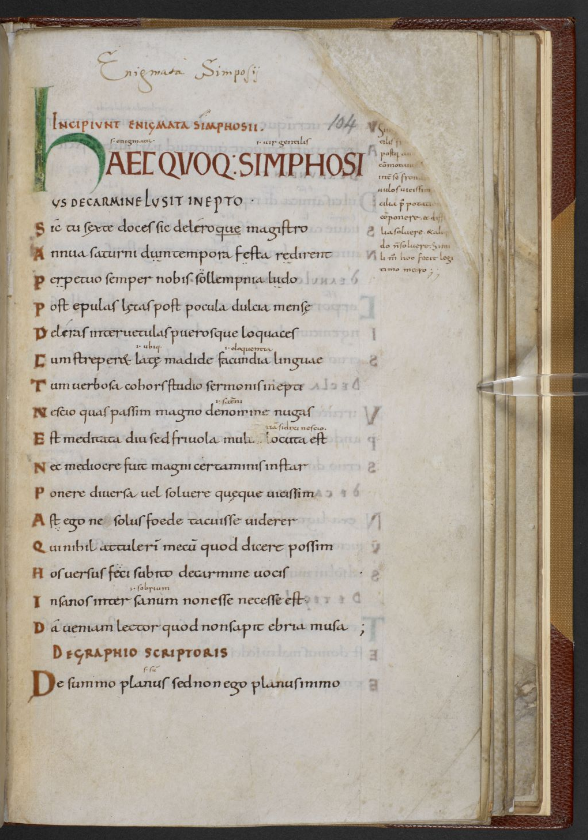
Title page of the riddles of Symphosius, from the late tenth- or early eleventh-century London, British Library, Royal MS 12 c xxiii folio 104r

Symphosius (sometimes, in older scholarship and less properly, Symposius) was the author of the Aenigmata, an influential collection of 100 Latin riddles, probably from the late antique period. They have been transmitted along with their solutions.

== Biography ==
Nothing more is known of Symphosius's life than what can be gleaned from the riddles themselves: even his name is clearly 'a joking pseudonym, meaning “party boy” or the like'. Proposed dates of composition have ranged from the third century to the sixth. The prevailing view today is that they were probably composed in the late fourth or early fifth century. A range of circumstantial evidence in the content of the riddles suggests that Symphosius was writing in Roman North Africa.

== The riddles ==
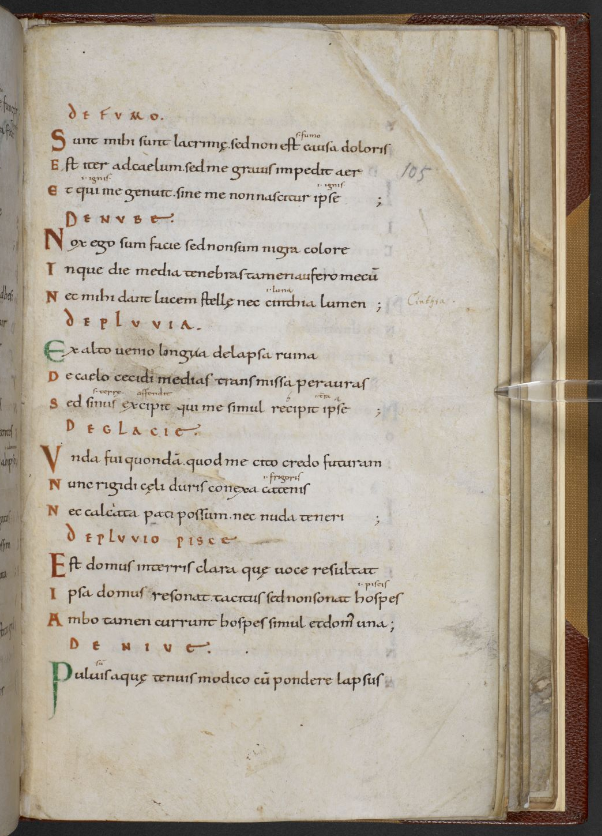
Symphosius's riddles on smoke, a cloud, rain, ice, river and fish, and snow, in London, British Library, Royal MS 12 c xxiii folio 105r

The riddles themselves, written in tercets of dactylic hexameters, are of elegant Latinity. The author's brief preface states that they were written to form part of the entertainment at the Saturnalia. This could be a literary convention, and the passage may not even have been original, but the riddles do 'copy their form(and some of their content) from Martial's Xenia, a collection of enigmatic descriptions of xenia (Saturnalian gifts)'.

According to Sebo, the preface to Symphosius's riddles 'reveals that within Symphosius' milieu there is still a conception of riddles as oral and agonistic' going back to Antique traditions of the symposium. However, the riddles themselves are highly literary: 'in thus removing the Riddle form from its popular context as a guessing game, so to speak, and endowing it with a new autonomy and intertextual sophistication Symphosius "invents" what was later termed the Literary Riddle'. Sebo also argues that the collection is carefully structured as a literary whole, proceeding from the more light-hearted to the more sombre, and drawing together material similar in subject (such as whether the solutions are plants, animals or artefacts), metaphorical themes, or aural similarity of lemmata. She argues that, since the solutions are transmitted with the riddles in the manuscript, they too are to be read as part of the sophisticated literary form of Symphosius's work; and she claims that overall the work meditates on the material world, giving voices to creatures and objects whose perspectives on the world were not ordinarily heard.

Symphosius's collection opens with riddles about writing; these riddles about the act of writing stand as a meta-comment on Symphosius's own literary act in writing the riddles: Thus the second riddle is Harundo ('reed'):

Dulcis amica ripae, semper uicina profundis,
Suaue cano Musis; nigro perfusa colore,
Nuntia sum linguae digitis signata magistris.
Sweet darling of the banks, always close to the depths, sweetly I
sing for the Muses; when drenched with black, I am the tongue’s
messenger by guiding fingers pressed.

Another is Echo. Here, Symphosius mischievously proves 'prepared to defy Juno's curse and restore to Echo the ability to speak for herself':

Virgo modesta nimis legem bene seruo pudoris;
Ore procax non sum, nec sum temeraria linguae;
Vltro nolo loqui, sed do responsa loquenti.
A modest maid, too well I observe the law of modesty;
I am not pert in speech nor rash of tongue;
of my own accord I will not speak, but I answer him who speaks.

=== Intrinsic nature of the Symphosius riddles, and how they may be solved ===
Based on a systematic analysis of the riddles, Hatfield argues that few in our age have grasped either what kind of riddle these actually are, or how they are intended to work, and that few have any idea what information these riddles in fact disclose once they are solved correctly.

The Greek word αἰνίγμα (ainigma) generally refers to a simple type of riddle which asks a question clearly marked as such. In contrast, the Greek word γρῖφος (griphos), whose primary meaning is a woven fishing basket, serves additionally to denote a more sophisticated riddle which, according to Luz, 'consists in a claim or statement which seems to make sense at first sight, unless, of course, the recipient realises that there is something wrong with this claim and that there must be a different meaning behind it. The γρῖφος (...) does not explicitly tell the recipient that it contains a hidden meaning which has to be found; it rather misleads him unless he is capable of discovering its point'.

Equivalent riddles in Latin were known by the term 'scirpus', meaning a bulrush. The logical connection between such riddles and wicker baskets or bulrushes arises because this kind of riddle emulates the intersecting intricacy observed in articles made from plaited rush-work. The woven/intersecting property reflects what it takes to contrive such a riddle. One or more words are first selected for concealment. Their constituent letters are then shuffled, extra letters added as required, and all are now woven together to form a finished string of text. Here now is a spelling riddle which has multiple solutions (i.e. polyvalent).

A rudimentary example in English will suffice to illustrate what is meant here by 'polyvalent' and by 'intersecting intricacy'. We may easily recover the word "riddle" from the word "disorderly". But in the process we might be "sorry" if we could not "rely" upon restoring good "order".

This method for creating riddles leaves them pregnant with concealed information accessible only when the riddle is solved to recover its hidden words. Thus a marginal note on Lucian of Samosata's Greek text known as Vitarum Auctio asserts as follows:

Griphos and Ainigma differ, because for the Ainigma someone admits being ignorant.
But for the Griphos he is ignorant (whilst) supposing he understands.

Anagrammatic dispersion of this kind is merely an implementation of what is termed 'transposition', cited by Kahn as one of two basic transformations available for use in cryptography. When compared with 'substitution' (the alternative method), transposition offers the advantages of steganography... such that many readers will never realise that anything more is intended by the inclusion of a particular word beyond its literal meaning.

According to Hatfield, the Symphosius riddles are spelling riddles of the griphos/scirpus type and follow the principles outlined above. They have been generated by writers who first select certain words or names to be concealed before dispersing the letters required to spell those words into a longer passage of text. That would explain why the Symphosius riddles appear at first sight curiously facile. Yet Hatfield believes that there is far more to these riddles than is widely recognised today.

=== Contents ===
The complete set of solutions of Symphosius's riddles (according to Hickman du Bois) is: 1. graphium/stilus, 2. harundo/reed, 3. anulus cum gemma/signet ring, 4. clavis/key, 5. catena/chain, 6. tegula/roof-tiles, 7. fumus/smoke, 8. nebula/fog, 9. pluvia/rain, 10. glacies/ice, 11. nix/snow, 12. flumen et pisces/a river with fish, 13. navis/ship, 14. pullus in ovo/chicken in its shell, 15. vipera/viper, 16. tinea/bookworm, 17. aranea/spider, 18. coclea/snail, 19. rana/frog, 20. testudo/tortoise, 21. talpa/mole, 22. formica/ant, 23. musca/fly, 24. curculio/corn-worm, 25. mus/mouse, 26. grus/crane, 27. cornix/crow, 28. vespertilio/bat, 29. ericius/hedgehog, 30. peduculus/louse, 31. phoenix/phoenix, 32. taurus/bull, 33. lupus/wolf, 34. vulpes/fox, 35. capra/she-goat, 36. porcus/pig, 37. mula/mule, 38. tigris/tiger, 39. centaurus/centaur, 40. papaver/poppy, 41. malva/mallow, 42. beta/beet, 43. cucurbita/gourd, 44. cepa/onion, 45. rosa/rose, 46. viola/violet, 47. tus/frankincense, 48. Murra/Myrrh, 49. ebur/ivory, 50. fenum/hay, 51. mola/mill, 52. farina/flour, 53. vitis/vine, 54. amus/fish-hook, 55. acula/needle, 56. caliga/boot, 57. clavus caligarius/boot-nail, 58. capillus/a hair, 59. pila/ball, 60. serra/saw, 61. ancora/anchor, 62. pons/bridge, 63. spongia/sponge, 64. tridens/trident, 65. sagitta/arrow, 66. flagellus/scourge, 67. lanterna/lantern, 68. vitreum/glass, 69. speculum/mirror, 70. clepsydra/water-clock, 71. puteus/well, 72. tubus ligneus/wooden pipe, 73. uter/wine-skin, 74. lapis/stone, 75. clax/lime, 76. silex/flint, 77. rotae/wheels, 78. scalae/flight of steps, 79. scopa/broom, 80. tintinnabulum/bell, 81. laguna/earthenware jar, 82. conditum/spiced wine, 83. vinum in acetum conversum/wine turned to vinegar, 84. malum/apple, 85. perna/ham, 86. malleus/hammer, 87. pistillus/pestle, 88. strigilis aenea/bronze strigil, 89 balneum/bath, 90. tessera/die, 91. pecunia/money, 92. mulier quae geminos pariebat/mother of twins, 93. miles podages/gouty soldier, 94. luscus allium vendens/a one-eyed seller of garlic, 95. funambulus/rope-dancer, 96. missing?, 97. umbra/shadow, 98. Echo/Echo, 99. somnus/sleep, 100. monumentum/tombstone.

== Influence ==
The Aenigmata were influential on later Latin riddle-writers, inspiring the Bern Riddles, those of Aldhelm, Tatwine, and others. Ten of them appear in the riddle-contest in Historia Apollonii Regis Tyri. They had some popularity as school-texts among Renaissance humanists: some appear in the anonymous Aenigmata et griphi veterum et recentium (Douai 1604), which Joachim Camerarius translated seventeen into Greek for his Elementa rhetoricae of 1545.

== Manuscripts ==
The Aenigmata come down to us in more than thirty manuscripts. The most notable of these is the famous Codex Salmasianus (Paris, 10318).

== Editions ==
The editio princeps was by Joachimus Perionius, Paris, 1533; the most recent editions are:

- E. F. Corpet, Paris, 1868, with witty French translation
- Elizabeth Hickman du Bois (ed. and trans.), The Hundred Riddles of Symphosius (Woodstock, Vermont: The Elm Tree Press, 1912), with elegant English translation
- Raymond T. Ohl. 1928. The Enigmas of Symphosius (Philadelphia) (with English translation)
- Fr. Glorie (ed.), Variae collectiones aenignmatvm Merovingicae aetatis (pars altera), Corpvs Christianorvm, Series Latina, 133a (Turnhout: Brepols, 1968), pp. 620–723.
- Bergamin, Manuela, Aenigmata Symposii: La fondazione dell'enigmistica come genere poetico, Per verba. testi mediolatini con trad, 22 (Florence: SISMEL edizioni del Galluzzo, 2005)
- Symphosius, The Aenigmata: An Introduction, Text and Commentary, ed. by T. J. Leary (London: Bloomsbury, 2014).
- Christian Rösch, Symphosius. Rätsel (Ditzingen: Reclam, 2025) (with German translation and commentary)
