= Elliott Van Kirk Dobbie =

American historian (1907-1970)

Elliott Van Kirk Dobbie (May 9, 1907 – March 23, 1970) was an American scholar of Anglo-Saxon literature who taught English at Columbia University.

== Early life ==
Dobbie was born in Brooklyn, New York City, in 1907.

== Education and academic career ==
Dobbie studied at Columbia University, being awarded a bachelor's in 1927 and a first class master's in American Literature in 1929. He began teaching English in Long Island in the same year, but later returned to teach at Columbia in 1934. In 1937, he received his PhD from Columbia, and was promoted to the role of Instructor. He later became assistant professor in 1942, Associate Professor in 1945, and Professor in 1951.

While studying and teaching, Dobbie began assisting George Philip Krapp on a six-volume edition entitled the Anglo-Saxon Poetic Records, considered the standard edition of Old English poetry. The first three volumes were mainly edited by Krapp (The Junius Manuscript in 1931, and in 1932 The Vercelli Book and The Paris Psalter and Meters of Boethius), but he soon died. This left Dobbie working on the final three volumes, finishing Krapp's work on The Exeter Book in 1936, and editing alone The Ango-Saxon Minor Poems in 1942, and Beowulf and Judith in 1953. He also wrote articles for the first edition of the Columbia Encyclopedia, including those on Shakespeare and Chaucer.

Dobbie also served a long history with the journal American Speech, first working as assistant editor from 1939 until 1940. He was then promoted to associate editor for a year, before becoming managing editor from 1942 until 1947. During this period, he often argued with other editors over manuscript editing styles, but the journal ran smoothly enough. He was then associate editor for another three years, and a member of the editorial board from 1952 until 1965.

As a philologist, he had (at least) a basic knowledge of various languages:

- Sanskrit
- Homeric Greek
- Latin
- French
- Italian
- Gothic
- Icelandic
- German
- Swedish
- Dutch
- Irish
- Welsh
- Breton

Dobbie served on the executive committee of the Linguistic Circle of New York for several years, becoming vice president from 1955 until 1957, then President from 1958 until 1960. He was granted a Guggenheim Fellowship in 1948.

He twice served as chairman of the executive committee for Columbia's Italian department, for a year in 1957 and again from 1960 until 1963. In 1966 he served as acting chairman for the English department.

== Personal life ==
In 1937, Dobbie married Mary Lorraine Kout, an associate in Columbia's English department. She edited the second edition of the Columbia Encyclopedia. They had at least one child, a son named William.

Dobbie died at his home on March 23, 1970, after suffering from a brief illness.

== Selected bibliography ==
=== Edited works ===
Title	Time of first publication	First edition publisher/publication	Unique identifier	Notes
The Junius Manuscript	1931	Columbia University Press	OCLC 353894	Part of Anglo-Saxon Poetic Records; with George Philip Krapp
The Vercelli Book	1932	Columbia University Press	OCLC 471779707	Part of Anglo-Saxon Poetic Records; with George Philip Krapp
The Paris Psalter and Meters of Boethius	1932	Columbia University Press	OCLC 1032033198	Part of Anglo-Saxon Poetic Records; with George Philip Krapp
The Exeter Book	1936	Columbia University Press	OCLC 559086101	Part of Anglo-Saxon Poetic Records; with George Philip Krapp (deceased)
The Anglo-Saxon Minor Poems	1942	Columbia University Press	OCLC 137293763	Part of Anglo-Saxon Poetic Records
Beowulf and Judith	1953	Columbia University Press	OCLC 221021233	Part of Anglo-Saxon Poetic Records

=== Books ===
Title	Time of first publication	First edition publisher/publication	Unique identifier	Notes
The Manuscripts of Cædmon's Hymn and Bede's Death Song	1937	Columbia University Press	OCLC 1100456573	Part of Columbia University Studies in English and Comparative Literature series

=== Articles ===
Title	Time of publication	Journal	Volume (Issue)	Page range	Unique identifier	Notes
"Pacific Place Names and the History of Discovery"	Dec 1961	American Speech	36 (4)	258–265	JSTOR 453798	
"Review: Dialect Components in Modern Standard English"	Oct 1964	American Speech	39 (3)	216–217	JSTOR 453632	
