= Anglo-Saxon riddles =

Part of Anglo-Saxon literature

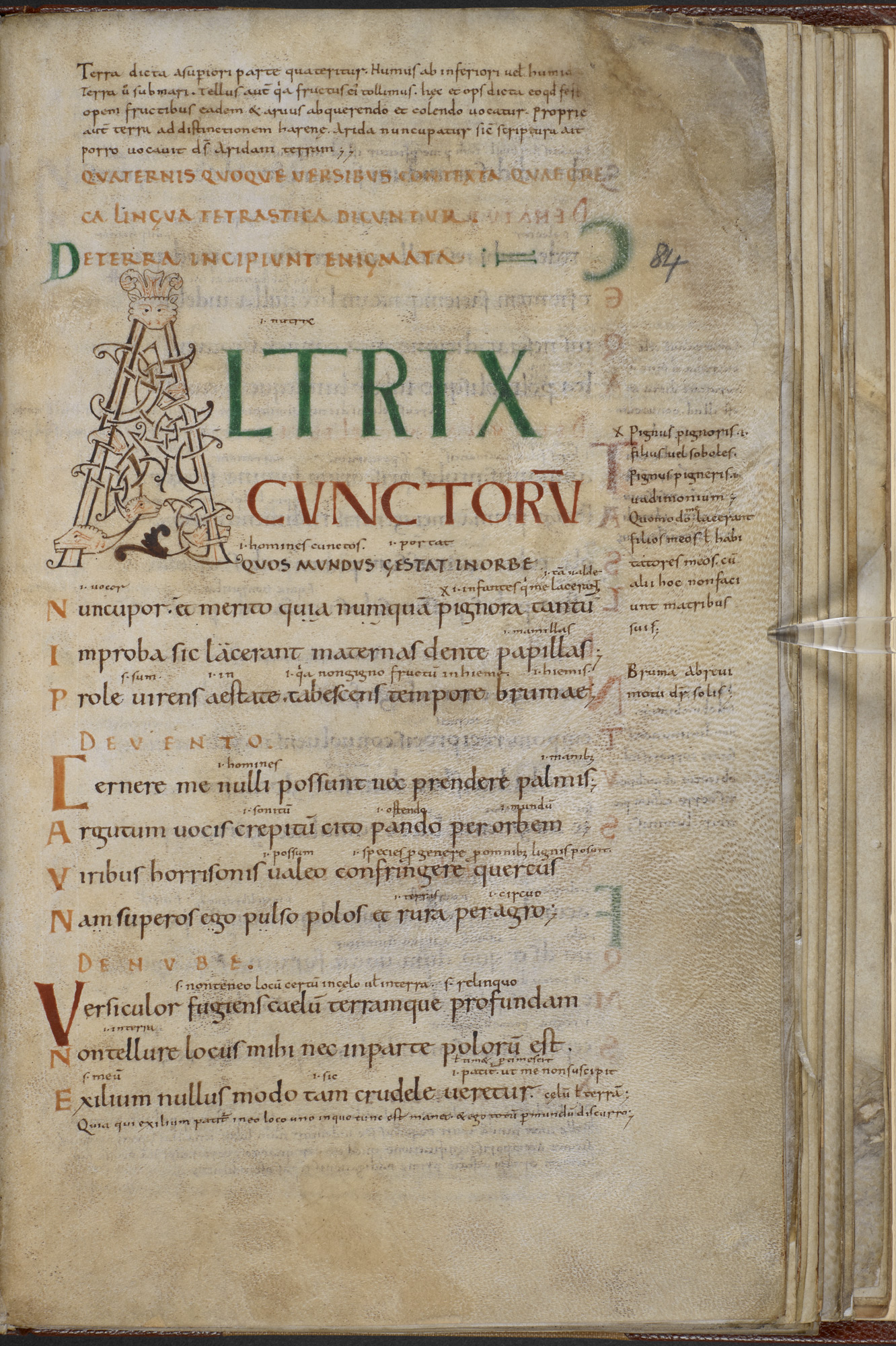
Opening of Aldhelm's riddles in the late tenth- or early eleventh-century manuscript London, British Library, Royal MA 12 c xxiii, folio 84r

Anglo-Saxon riddles are a significant genre of Anglo-Saxon literature. The riddle was a major, prestigious literary form in early medieval England, and riddles were written both in Latin and Old English verse. The pre-eminent composer of Latin riddles in early medieval England was Aldhelm (d. 709), while the Old English verse riddles found in the tenth-century Exeter Book include some of the most famous Old English poems.

== History ==
=== Antique inspirations ===
Riddles are an internationally widespread feature of oral literatures and scholars have not doubted that they were traditional to Old English culture. But the history of riddles as a literary genre in England seems to be rooted in an influential collection of late Antique Latin riddles, possibly from north Africa, attributed to a poet called Symphosius, whose work English scholars emulated and adapted.

=== Aldhelm ===
As the conversion of England to Christianity proceeded during the seventh century, Old English-speakers studied Latin and gained access to Latin literacy and literary traditions. Apparently relatively early in his career, a prominent early Christian aristocrat, scholar, abbot and bishop from Wessex, Aldhelm, composed the Epistola ad Acircium, a Latin treatise on the poetic arts. Apparently inspired by the hundred enigmata ('enigmas') of Symphosius, as well as another, possibly north-Italian collection of metrical Latin riddles known today as the Bern Riddles, perhaps along with Byzantine literary riddling, Aldhelm included in this his own collection of one hundred hexametrical enigmata.

Aldhelm's most prominent themes were 'the natural world, daily life, church furniture, and the classroom. A bookish quality is evident in many of the other topics addressed, which would certainly have been outside the daily experience of Anglo-Saxon England'.

=== Bede, Tatwine, Eusebius, and Boniface ===
Perhaps because of its use in Anglo-Saxon education, Aldhelm's collection inspired several more Anglo-Latin riddle collections. Recent scholarship suggests that nineteen riddles attributed to Bede (d. 735) in an eleventh-century manuscript indeed belong to his partly lost Liber epigrammatum. Bede's contemporary Tatwine (d. 734), a Mercian priest and Archbishop of Canterbury, composed forty acrostic riddles, which were supplemented by a further sixty attributed to a scholar with the name Eusebius whose identity is not securely known. These riddles of Tatwine and riddles of Eusebius survive in two manuscripts, as a set of one hundred riddles. It is almost certain that Tatwine had read the riddles of Aldhelm; Frederick Tupper believed that this influence was minimal, but subsequent scholars have argued that Tatwine's riddles owed a substantial debt to those of Aldhelm. Both Tatwine and Eusebius composed on everyday objects and abstract concepts, including the theological, philosophical, and mythological.

Meanwhile, Saint Boniface (d. 754) composed a sequence of ten riddles on the virtues and another of ten on the vices. These were "for the moral instruction of an unnamed female correspondent", were influenced greatly by Aldhelm, and contained many references to works of Vergil (the Aeneid, the Georgics, and the Eclogues).

The Lorsch riddles are also thought to have been composed in Anglo-Saxon England.

=== Old English riddles ===
Aldhelm's Latin riddling was also inspiring the composition of riddles in Old English as early as the eighth century: this is attested by the Leiden Riddle, a translation of Aldhelm's riddle on the lorica (breastplate).

However, the vast majority of Old English riddles are attested in the later tenth-century Exeter Book, which in its current, fragmentary state contains around 94 riddles (scholars debate precisely how many there are because divisions between poems are not always clear). There is speculation that there may once have been, or have been intended to be, 100 riddles in the book, since this would match the Latin collections discussed above. The riddles are all written in alliterative verse; their solutions are not given, and several end with an injunction to 'say what I am called', suggesting that they were indeed recited as verbal entertainment; yet they clearly have diverse origins. The search for answers to the riddles has been addressed at length by Patrick J. Murphy, focusing on thought patterns of the period, but there is still no unanimous agreement on some of them.

There are also two Old English prose riddles, surviving on folio 16v in the mid-eleventh-century psalter British Library, Cotton Vitellius E.xviii, made in Winchester, within a short text on secret codes, found among a collection of notes, charms, prayers, and computistical tables.

The Franks Casket, a box made of whale bone, also features a text written in Old English with runic script which some scholars have viewed as a riddle (with the proposed solution 'whale').

== Scholarly interpretations ==
The Old English riddles have been much more studied than the Latin ones, but recent work has argued that the two groups need to be understood together as 'a vigorous, common tradition of Old English and Anglo-Latin enigmatography'. Much past work on the Old English riddles has focused on finding and debating solutions, but a new wave of work has started using riddles as a way to study Anglo-Saxon world-views through the critical approaches of eco-criticism. The Exeter Book riddles can be situated within a wider tradition of 'speaking objects' in Anglo-Saxon culture and have much in common with poems such as The Dream of the Rood and The Husband's Message and with artefacts such as the Alfred Jewel or the Brussels Cross, which endow inanimate things with first-person voices. By representing the familiar, material world from an oblique angle, many riddles from early medieval England complicate or challenge social norms such as martial masculinity, patriarchal attitudes to women, lords' dominance over their servants, and humans' over animals. Thirteen, for example, have as their solution an implement, which speaks of itself through the riddle as a servant to its lord; but these sometimes also suggest the power of the servant to define the master. Riddles have also been shown as both inducing and easing anxiety, through their reinterpretation of the known world.

The Latin enigmata of Aldhelm and his Anglo-Latin successors are presented in manuscripts with their solutions as their title, and seldom close with a challenge to the reader to guess their solution. Unlike the Latin Anglo-Saxon riddles, the Old English ones tend not to rely on intellectual obscurity to make the riddle more difficult for the reader, rather focusing on describing processes of manufacture and transformation. The reader must be observant to any double meanings or "hinge words" in order to discover the answer to the riddle.

== Editions and translations ==
=== All Anglo-Saxon riddles ===
- Andy Orchard (ed and trans), The Old English and Anglo-Latin Riddle Tradition, Dumbarton Oaks Medieval Library 69 (Cambridge, MA: Harvard University Press, 2021); accompanied by Andy Orchard, A Commentary on the Old English and Anglo-Latin Riddle Tradition, Supplements to the Dumbarton Oaks Medieval Library (Washington, DC: Dumbarton Oaks, 2021).
- The Riddle Ages: Early Medieval Riddles, Translations and Commentaries, ed. by Megan Cavell and others, 2nd edn (Birmingham: University of Birmingham, 2020–).

=== The Exeter Book riddles only ===
==== Editions ====
- The Riddles of the Exeter Book, ed. by Frederick Tupper (Boston: Ginn, c1910), archive.org, Wikimedia Commons
- Elliott van Kirk Dobbie and George Philip Krapp (eds), The Exeter Book, Anglo-Saxon Poetic Records 3 (New York: Columbia University Press, 1936), digitised at https://web.archive.org/web/20181206091232/http://ota.ox.ac.uk/desc/3009
- Craig Williamson (ed), The Old English Riddles of the Exeter Book (Chapel Hill: University of North Carolina Press, 1977)
- Bernard J. Muir (ed), The Exeter Anthology of Old English Poetry: An Edition of Exeter Dean and Chapter MS 3501, 2nd edn, 2 vols (Exeter: University of Exeter Press, 2000)
- Martin Foys, et al. (eds.) Old English Poetry in Facsimile Project, (Madison, WI: Center for the History of Print and Digital Culture, 2019-).

==== Translations ====
- Paull F. Baum, Anglo-Saxon Riddles of the Exeter Book (Durham, North Carolina: Duke University Press, 1963), https://en.wikisource.org/wiki/Anglo-Saxon_Riddles_of_the_Exeter_Book
- Kevin Crossley-Holland (trans), The Exeter Book Riddles, revised edition (London: Enitharmon Press, 2008)
- Greg Delanty, Seamus Heaney and Michael Matto, The Word Exchange: Anglo-Saxon Poems in Translation (New York: Norton, 2010)
- F. H. Whitman (ed and trans), Old English Riddles (Ottawa: Canadian Federation for the Humanities, 1982)
- Craig Williamson (trans), A Feast of Creatures: Anglo-Saxon Riddle-Songs (Philadelphia: University of Pennsylvania Press, 1982)

=== Anglo-Latin riddles only ===
==== All Anglo-Latin riddles ====
- Tatuini omnia opera, Variae collectiones aenigmatum merovingicae aetatis, Anonymus de dubiis nominibus, ed. by Fr. Glorie, trans. by Erika von Erhardt-Seebold, Corpus christianorum: series latina, 133-133a, 2 vols (Turnholt: Brepols, 1968), vol I, vol II.

==== Aldhelm's riddles only ====
- Aldhelmi Opera, ed. by Rvdolfvs Ehwald, Monumenta Germanicae Historica, Auctorum Antiquissorum, 15, 3 vols (Berlin, 1919)
- Aldhelm: The Poetic Works, trans. by Michael Lapidge and James L. Rosier (Cambridge, 1985)
- Through a Gloss Darkly: Aldhelm’s Riddles in the British Library ms Royal 12.C.xxiii, ed. and trans. by Nancy Porter Stork, Pontifical Institute of Mediaeval Studies, Studies and Texts, 98 (Toronto: Pontifical Institute of Mediaeval Studies, 1990)
- Saint Aldhelm's "Riddles", ed. and trans. by A. M. Juster (Toronto: University of Toronto Press, 2015)
