= Anglo-Saxon Poetic Records =

The Anglo-Saxon Poetic Records (ASPR) is a six-volume edition intended at the time of its publication to encompass all known Old English poetry. Despite many subsequent editions of individual poems or collections, it has remained the standard reference work for scholarship in this field.

== History ==
The edition was conceived by George Philip Krapp (1872–1934), who edited volumes 1, 2, and 5 while Professor of English at Columbia University, with the assistance of his student and colleague Elliott Van Kirk Dobbie. Krapp died partway through editing volume 3, and Dobbie completed this edition before going on to complete the series by editing volumes 6 (which came out in 1942) and 4 (which emerged in 1953). According to Henry Wiggins, the long gap before the publication of Volume 4, which contains the poems Beowulf and Judith, was partly due

to Elliott's feeling that there was no urgency about completing the Beowulf volume, because there were so many competent editions. The Press, like any publisher, was troubled about the absence of Volume V [recte Volume IV] from a six-volume set, and I was assigned the duty of "prodding" Elliott. Despite all my efforts, he gave us the manuscript when he wanted to—when he felt he had something to contribute.

In 1960, the ASPR became the basis for Bessinger's A Short Dictionary of Anglo-Saxon Poetry. A concordance to the ASPR was published in 1978.

The Old English texts in the ASPR were digitised by Greg Hidley under the auspices of the Toronto Dictionary of Old English project; this text was then corrected by Duncan Macrae-Gibson, though still with a few divergences from the ASPR text.

The ASPR also serves as a foundation for the digital Old English Poetry in Facsimile Project (2019-), designed both to augment the ASPR and supersede this resource as a new and digital edition of record and reference, with updated materials, scholarly citations and methodologies.

== Contents ==
Scholars vary, when citing the ASPR, as to whether they regard it as six works in a numbered series or as a single work in six volumes.

As six individual works, the ASPR comprises:

- Krapp, George Philip, ed. (1931), The Junius Manuscript, The Anglo-Saxon Poetic Records: A Collective Edition, 1, New York: Columbia University Press, ISBN 9780231087650, OCLC 353894.
- Krapp, George Philip, ed. (1932), The Vercelli Book, The Anglo-Saxon Poetic Records: A Collective Edition, 2, New York: Columbia University Press, ISBN 9780231087667, OCLC 635743.
- Krapp, George Philip; Dobbie, Elliott Van Kirk, eds. (1936), The Exeter Book, The Anglo-Saxon Poetic Records: A Collective Edition, 3, New York: Columbia University Press, ISBN 9780231087667, OCLC 352008.
- Dobbie, Elliott Van Kirk, ed. (1953), Beowulf and Judith, The Anglo-Saxon Poetic Records: A Collective Edition, 4, New York: Columbia University Press, OCLC 352009.
- Krapp, George Philip, ed. (1932), The Paris Psalter and the Meters of Boethius, The Anglo-Saxon Poetic Records: A Collective Edition, 5, New York: Columbia University Press, ISBN 9780231087698, OCLC 351981.
- Dobbie, Elliott Van Kirk, ed. (1942), The Anglo-Saxon Minor Poems, The Anglo-Saxon Poetic Records: A Collective Edition, 6, New York: Columbia University Press, ISBN 9780231087704, OCLC 351982.

As a single work, it is thought of as:

- Krapp, George Philip; Dobbie, Elliott Van Kirk, eds. (1931–1953), The Anglo-Saxon Poetic Records: A Collective Edition, vol. 6 vols, New York: Columbia University Press, OCLC 470435953.

The series was printed in the UK by Routledge and Kegan Paul, but the UK year of publication is not always clear, leading to some variation in citations. The series was reprinted by Columbia University Press in 1961.
