= Fernando Cazón Vera =

Ecuadorian poet and journalist

Fernando Cazón Vera is an Ecuadorian poet and journalist. He was born in Quito in 1935 but moved as a child to Guayaquil upon the early death of his father in 1942. He was the only child of Ecuadorian Leonor Vera. His father, German communist activist Jan Andries Jolles, also known in exile since 1933 as ‘Manuel Enrique Cazón Arribar’, had two other children from a different relationship. Jolles was a son of Nazi Party member André Jolles, while Fernando’s mother was a daughter of Alfredo R. Vera Benavides, Chief Public Prosecutor of Guayaquil. He grew up surrounded by his maternal family, including uncles Pedro Jorge Vera and Alfredo Vera Vera and his cousin, ballet dancer Noralma Vera Arrata.

In Guayaquil he studied at the Colegio Vicente Rocafuerte and then the University of Guayaquil.

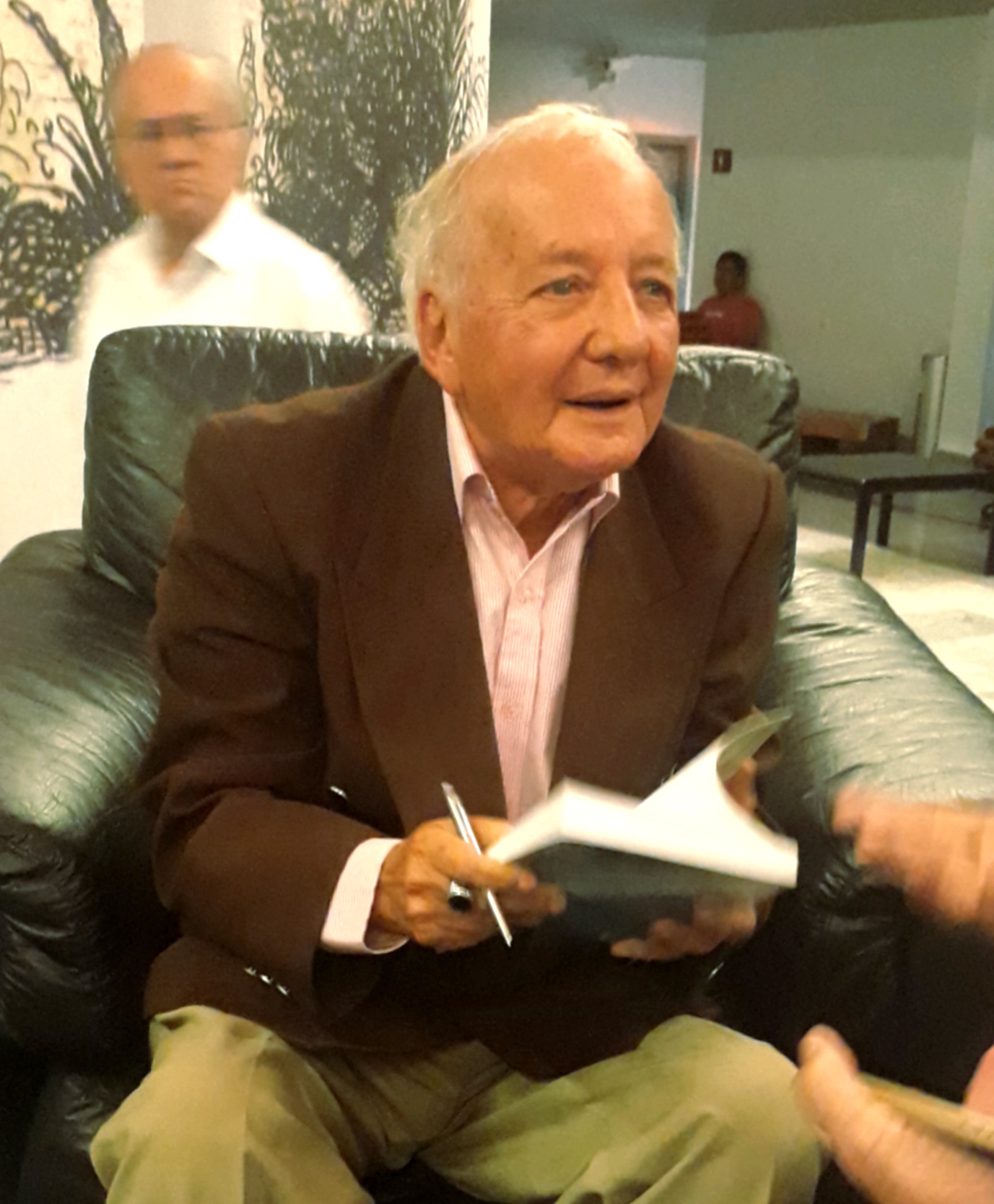
Fernando Cazón Vera in 2018

He worked for several Ecuadorian newspapers and magazines, among them La Hora; he was lately a columnist for the Guayaquil newspapers Expreso and Extra. He was also a university professor for fifteen years. He published numerous poetry collections during his career. He was associated with the literary group Madrugada which also included figures such as Efraín Jara Idrovo, Jorge Enrique Adoum, Hugo Salazar Tamariz, etc.

He received awards from the Municipality of Guayaquil and the Guayaquil Journalists Association. The Ecuadorian House of Culture published an extensive anthology of his poetic work (1958-2000) in the Poesía Junta collection.

In 2018, he received the Premio Eugenio Espejo, the country's most important literary award.

== Poetry ==
- Las canciones salvadas (1957)
- El enviado (1958)
- La guitarra rota (1967)
- La misa (1967)
- El extraño (1968)
- Poemas comprometidos (1972)
- El libro de las paradojas (1976)
- El hijo pródigo (1977)
- Las canciones salvadas (antología, 1980)
- La pájara pinta (1984)
- Rompecabezas (1986)
- Este pequeño mundo (1996)
- Cuando el río suena (1996)
- A fuego lento (1998)
- Relevo de prueba (2005)
- La sombra degollada (2006)
