= Robert M. Adams (literary scholar) =

- Born: 1915; New York City, U.S.
- Died: December 16, 1996 (aged 80–81); Santa Fe, New Mexico, U.S.
- Relatives: Carl Frederick von Saltza (grandfather); George Philip Krapp (father)
- Awards: Guggenheim Fellowship (1959, 1974)

Academic background
- Education: Columbia University

Academic work
- Discipline: English literature
- Institutions: Columbia University; Rutgers University; University of Wisconsin–Madison; Cornell University; University of California, Los Angeles
- Doctoral students: Stanley Corngold

Robert Martin Adams (1915 – December 16, 1996) was an American literary scholar.

== Biography ==
Adams was born Robert Martin Krapp in New York City in 1915. He was the son of George Philip Krapp, a Columbia University English professor, and grandson of Swedish painter Carl Frederick von Saltza. His uncle was muralist Philip von Saltza.

Adams received his B.A., M.A. and Ph.D., all from Columbia University, and changed his name after serving in the army during World War II. Adams taught at Columbia, Rutgers, and the University of Wisconsin–Madison, before joining the Cornell University faculty in 1950. His students at Cornell included future Princeton University professor and Kafka scholar Stanley Corngold. He joined the University of California, Los Angeles faculty in 1968 and retired in 1979.

Adams received the Guggenheim Fellowship twice, once in 1959, and a second time in 1974. He was one of the founding editors of The Norton Anthology of English Literature and an editor of the Hudson Review.

Adams was a 1978 National Book Award for Translated Literature finalist for translating Niccolò Machiavelli's The Prince. A second edition of his translation was published in 1992 (A Norton Critical Edition).

== Personal life and family ==
Adams died on December 16, 1996, in Santa Fe, New Mexico. He was survived by his wife, and his son, Nicholas Adams, who is an emeritus professor of architecture at Vassar College.
