= Avital Ronell =

American philosopher (born 1952)

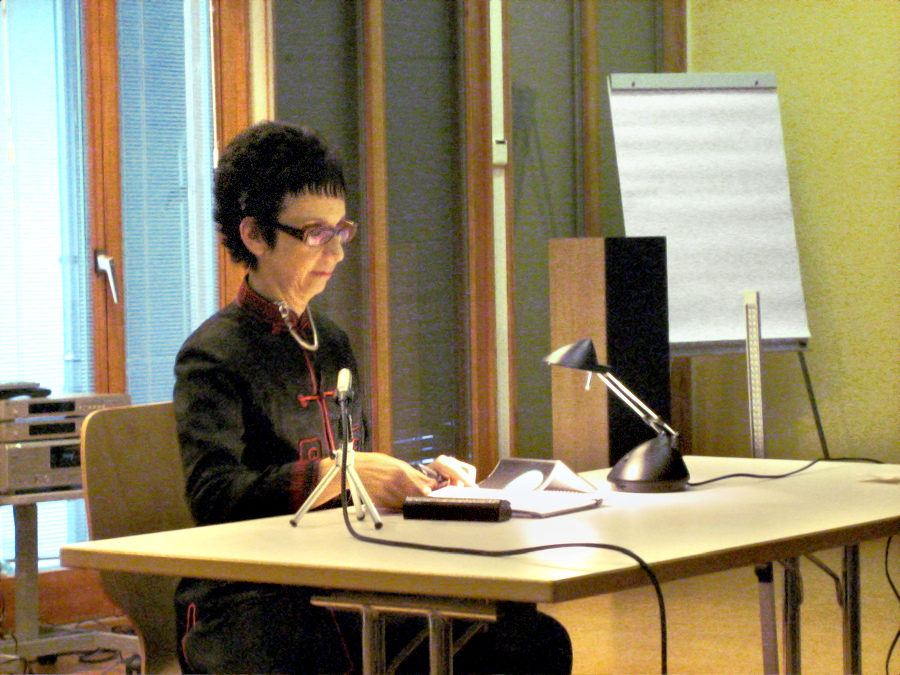
- Ronell in 2006
- Born: 15 April 1952 (age 74); Prague, Czechoslovakia (now Czech Republic)

Education
- Education: Rutgers Preparatory School; Middlebury College; Princeton University
- Doctoral advisor: Stanley Corngold

Philosophical work
- Era: 20th-/21st-century philosophy
- Region: Western philosophy
- School: Continental philosophy, critical theory, deconstruction, existentialism, hermeneutics, post-structuralism
- Main interests: Addiction, deficiency, dictation, disappearance of authority, disease, drugs, excessive force, ethics, legal subjects, rumor, stupidity, technology, telephony, tests, trauma, war
- Notable ideas: Killer-texts, narcoanalysis

Avital Ronell (/ˈɑːvɪtəl roʊˈnɛl/ AH-vit-əl roh-NEL; Hebrew: אביטל רונל; born 15 April 1952) is an American academic who writes about continental philosophy, literary studies, psychoanalysis, political philosophy, and ethics. She is a professor in the humanities and in the departments of Germanic languages and literature and comparative literature at New York University, where she co-directs the trauma and violence transdisciplinary studies program. As Jacques Derrida Professor of Philosophy, Ronell also teaches at the European Graduate School in Saas-Fee.

She has written about such topics as Johann Wolfgang von Goethe; Alexander Graham Bell and the telephone; the structure of the test in legal, pharmaceutical, artistic, scientific, Zen, and historical domains; stupidity; the disappearance of authority; childhood; and deficiency. Ronell is a founding editor of the journal Qui Parle.

In 2018 an eleven-month investigation at New York University determined that Ronell had sexually harassed a male graduate student, and the university suspended her without pay for the 2018–2019 academic year.

== Biography ==
Avital Ronell was born in Prague to Israeli diplomats and was a performance artist before entering academia. She emigrated to New York in 1956. She attended Rutgers Preparatory School and graduated in 1970. As a young immigrant, Ronell later stated, she frequently encountered xenophobia and antisemitism. She earned a Bachelor of Arts from Middlebury College, and subsequently studied with Jacob Taubes and Hans-Georg Gadamer at the Hermeneutic Institute at the Free University of Berlin. She received her doctorate of philosophy in German studies at Princeton University in 1979, where her advisor was Stanley Corngold and her dissertation concerned self-reflection in Johann Wolfgang von Goethe, Friedrich Hölderlin, and Franz Kafka. When she met Jacques Derrida at a symposium and he asked her name, she introduced herself as "Metaphysics", and he later wrote that he "found this little game rather clever." She subsequently studied with Derrida and Hélène Cixous in Paris. She went on to help introduce Derrida to American audiences by translating his essay on Kafka's "Before the Law", his essay on the law of gender/genre, his lectures on Nietzsche's relation to biography, and a number of other works. Ronell became a close friend of poet and novelist Pierre Alféri, Derrida's son, who later influenced Ronell in the titling of several of her major works. Alféri moved in with Ronell as a teenager following the revelation of his father's adultery.

A professor at the University of Virginia for a short time period, Ronell claims she was fired because she taught continental philosophy and "went to the gym on a regular basis: [her] colleagues were shocked by this—it didn't correspond to their image of an academic woman!" She joined the comparative literature faculty at the University of California, Riverside and then at University of California, Berkeley where she taught with Philippe Lacoue-Labarthe, Jean-Luc Nancy and Judith Butler. She was a close friend of the writer Kathy Acker and identified with Acker's fiction, saying they were "destined to each other." In 1996, she moved to New York University, where she co-taught a course with Jacques Derrida until 2004.

In 2009, the Centre Pompidou invited Ronell to hold an interview series with such artists and thinkers as Werner Herzog, Judith Butler, Dennis Cooper, Jean-Luc Nancy, and Suzanne Doppelt. Also in 2009, she began co-teaching courses with Slavoj Žižek. In 2010, François Noudelmann also co-taught with her, and co-curated the Walls and Bridges program with her in 2011.

Ronell served as Chair to the Division of Philosophy and Literature and to the Division of Comparative Literature at the Modern Language Association from 1993 to 1996, and gave a keynote address at the annual meeting of the American Comparative Literature Association in 2012.

She identifies as queer.

== Overview of works ==
Ronell argues for "the necessity of the unintelligible." In an account of the 1992 Rodney King beating, Ronell argued that the idiom of the "perfectly clear" recurrently serves as a code for the white lie. Instead of referring to herself as the author of a text, she has sometimes described herself as a "signatory," "operator," or even "television." She sometimes focuses on thinkers who clean up after other thinkers, arguing that what she calls "sanitation departments" sometimes undermine the work they are tidying up after.

=== Dictations: On Haunted Writing (1986) ===
Ronell investigates one of Goethe's most influential works, Conversations with Eckermann, which he did not write but instead dictated to a young companion, Johannes Peter Eckermann. Heralded by Nietzsche as "the best German book," Conversations with Eckermann contains Goethe's last thoughts about art, poetry, politics, religion, and the fate of German literature and philosophy. Ronell reads Conversations with Eckermann as a return from beyond the grave of the great master of German literature and science.

Ronell starts by exploring Goethe's focus on "a certain domain of immateriality—the nonsubstantializable apparitions ... [of] weather forecasting ... ghosts, dreams, and some forms of hidden, telepathic transmissions." Ronell renames the Goethe effect what she calls "killer-texts" and describes the effect as the textual machination destructive of values, of the "worthier (Werther, from The Sorrows of Young Werther)." The first part opens on Freud's debt to Goethe and reprints the frontispiece of The Psychopathology of Everyday Life. Ronell names Goethe the "secret councilor (Geheimrat)" of Freud and already anticipates her work on the Rat Man in the third footnote where she alludes to the "suppository logic, inserting the vital element into the narrative of the other." In the first section Ronell aims to "attune [her] ears to the telepathic orders that Goethe's phantom transmitted to Freud by a remote control system.

In general, Dictations: On Haunted Writing traces the closure without end of influence's computation. Ronell's task entails a reading practice where the analysis of a text must investigate the endless movement towards closure in dictation. Ronell thus practices what is called anasemic reading, a practice developed by Nicolas Abraham and Maria Torok, in which the psychoanalyst traces the textual metaphors, rhetorical structures, and linguistic associations of a writer/patient.

"Part Two" presents a case of literary parasitism between Eckermann and Goethe, and opens at the scene of Goethe's table in Weimar "the eleventh of September 1828, at two o'clock." In other words, Ronell re-imagines the scene that Eckermann illustrates at the beginning and ending of Conversations with Eckermann. Ronell starts to address the fiction of the writer as a particularly admirable human being and argues for the necessary passivity of the writer as a human being. Ronell also troubles the notion of a body of work as a totality. Ronell remaps earlier arguments about feminine appropriation in terms of writing, for Eckermann, which "involves recuperating something 'for myself,' for the most part instinctively; it entails repetitive acts of appropriation."

Dictations: On Haunted Writing explores how the work of writing in general adheres to a call dictated from elsewhere, a call formative of desire.

=== The Telephone Book: Technology — Schizophrenia — Electric Speech (1989) ===
Ronell questions the operations that such ordinary objects as the telephone and book dictate. She signs the text as the operator of the switchboard alongside Richard Eckersley, operator of design, and Michael Jensen, operator of compositor. Eckersley's design departs from his "typographic subtlety and restraint" towards a computer design, marked by new page-making software programs to interpret the text typographically. Eckersley dislodges the text from presumed conventional settings and shifts the focus of reading with inexplicable gaps, displacements between sentences and paragraphs, mirror imaging of pages facing one another, words blurred to the point of indecipherability, and a regular exaggeration of negative line spacing, spilling sentences over into each other. Pushing the limits of an ordinary "Table of Contents" or "Footnotes," the operators set up a "Directory Assistance," in which chapters appear as reference indexes, and a yellow pages entitled "Classified," in which footnotes appear as soliciting advertisements.

Following "A User's Manual," the text begins as if the reader answers a call: "And yet, you're saying yes, almost automatically, suddenly, sometimes irreversibly." Ronell makes clear that The Telephone Book is a philosophical project on questions concerning the telephone, the call, and the answering machines: "always incomplete, always unreachable, forever promising at once its essence and its existence, philosophy identifies itself finally with this promise, which is to say, with its own unreachability."

=== Crack Wars: Literature, Addiction, Mania (1992) ===
Ronell takes as her point of departure Nietzsche's position that, as long as culture has existed, it has supported and inspired addiction. She develops an argument investigating destructive desires that coincide with the war on drugs and with the very addiction to drugs which the war claims to want to vanquish. The text intends to disturb simple comprehension of drugs on one side or another of a binary opposition.

=== Finitude's Score: Essays for the End of the Millennium (1994) ===
Research assistant and friend, Shireen R.K. Patell, helped bring Finitude's Score to fruition. Finitude's Score collects a series of reflections on the fragile memory left at the close of the millennium. It looks into the projects responsible for devastating humanity and a thinking of the future. Ronell asks why the twentieth century stakes so much on a diction of deficiency. For Ronell, it says that, "we have been depleted." Ronell traces the relegitimization of war, the philosophical status of the rumor, the questionable force of the police, the test sites of technology, the corporeal policies of disease and a thoroughgoing reconstitution of the subject of law. In sum, Finitude's Score reads the desire to finish once and for all, to be done with issues definitively, as the everlasting legacy of the Western logos.

== Reception ==
Ronell's work has been both praised and criticized. In 1994, the journal Diacritics published a special edition "On the Work of Avital Ronell", in which Jonathan Culler wrote: "Over the past decade, Ronell has put together what must be one of the most remarkable critical oeuvres of our era ... Zeugmatically yoking the slang of pop culture with philosophical analysis, forcing the confrontation of high literature and technology or drug culture, Avital Ronell produces sentences that startle, irritate, illuminate. At once hilarious and refractory, her books are like no others." Judith Butler has said she feels deeply indebted to Ronell's influence on her work and wrote in an edited collection Reading Ronell: "The different path that Ronell takes is precisely the path of difference: gay, difficult, affirmative, ironic." The collection's editor Diane Davis highlighted the "singular provocation of Ronell's 'remarkable critical oeuvre,'" "the devastating insights, the unprecedented writing style, the relentless destabilizations." In the sixth session of The Beast and the Sovereign on February 6 of 2002, Jacques Derrida devoted special attention to Ronell's Stupidity and commends the untranslatable complexity of her "irony."

By contrast, in a 1990 review of The Telephone Book for the New York Times Book Review, novelist Robert Coover appreciated the "visual pyrotechnics" of the book's typography but found "the argument… to be that of a fairly conventional academic paper, recognizably party-lined with fashionable Continental voices like Jacques Lacan, Roland Barthes and Jacques Derrida," and found the connection that Ronell tried to establish between Heidegger, schizophrenia, and the telephone "weak." In a 2002 review of Stupidity for the Times Literary Supplement, philosopher Jonathan Rée said Ronell's "prose reads like a plodding translation of a French version of Heidegger, but there is hardly a sentence that does not try to stop the show to receive an ovation for its cleverness." Bernd Hüppauf (former chair of the German department at NYU who hired Ronell but was later replaced by her) similarly described her work as "translating incomprehensibility into pseudo-profundity."

== Sexual conduct investigation and suspension ==
In September 2017, a student, later identified as her male former graduate student Nimrod Reitman, filed a complaint in New York University's Title IX office accusing Ronell of sexual harassment, sexual assault, stalking, and retaliation over the span of three years, when she served as his doctoral supervisor. In May 2018, the university found Ronell responsible for sexual harassment and suspended her for the 2018–19 academic year. Ronell never admitted to sexual harassment, claiming that both parties' emails contained "exaggerated expressions of tenderness" because they are "both gay," not because she was sexually harassing him. On August 16, 2018, Reitman filed a lawsuit against Ronell and the university, alleging sexual harassment, sexual assault, and stalking.

Several major figures in the areas of feminism, queer theory, philosophy, literature, and history, including Judith Butler, Slavoj Žižek, Joan Scott, Gayatri Chakravorty Spivak, Jean-Luc Nancy, and others published a letter dated May 11, 2018 to NYU written in defense of Ronell. Additionally, Lisa Duggan and Chris Kraus published blog posts denying Ronell's sexual harassment charges.

The letter was subsequently criticized for suggesting that Ronell should be excused on the basis of the significance of her academic contributions and for imputing a "malicious intention" to Reitman. The #MeToo movement came under scrutiny as feminist scholars continued to support Ronell, despite the charges of sexual misconduct. Butler later regretted some wording of the letter and regretted implying "that Ronell’s status and reputation earn her differential treatment of any kind." Žižek argued that Ronell's years long sexual harassment of Reitman was "a series of acts of eccentricity." Duggan called Ronell's emails to Reitman "practices of queer intimacy."

Providing historical and institutional context, an article in the Los Angeles Review of Books argued that Ronell's inappropriate conduct was intimately linked to the power that she wields within the humanities as a "theory star." Political scientist Corey Robin noted that "Ronell's largest claims were on his time, on his life, on his attention and energy". Writer and critic Andrea Long Chu in The Chronicle of Higher Education described her experiences as a teaching assistant for Ronell at NYU, which made her "believe her accuser". Noting that Ronell seemed to have felt "persecuted" even while teaching, Andrea Long Chu argued that Ronell's desire for Reitman to make her "feel loved" stemmed not from feeling "entitle[d]" by "status" to "fuck" students, but, on the contrary, because "the relentless misogyny of the university" still seemed present to her:

[E]ven when she does have status and power and celebrity, she still thinks of herself as a vulnerable grad student in need of care and protection, ie, she thinks she still is the person Reitman is saying he is. (italics in original)

Ronell returned to teaching at NYU in the fall of 2019. Her course, "Unsettled Scores: Theories of Grievance, Stuckness, & Boundary Troubles," was advertised on campus with a flyer asking: "How have we secretly internalized penitentiary structures?" Ronell's return caused protests and frequent demands by student groups for her termination, such as the petition circulated by the graduate-student workers' union, carrying some 600 signatures, which called upon NYU to fire Ronell, a demand that was endorsed by NYU's Student Government general assembly. In February 2020, she took a semester-long leave of absence. As of fall 2023, Ronell continues to teach both undergraduate and graduate courses at NYU.

== Selected honors and awards ==
- 1995–1996: University of California President's Fellowship
- 1993: Research Fellow Award
- 1991: American Cultures Fellowship
- 1981–1983: Alexander von Humboldt-Stiftung Fellowship

== Publications (selected) ==
=== Books ===
- (2024) America: The Troubled Continent of Thought (ISBN 1-509-56027-0)
- (2018) Complaint: Grievance among Friends (ISBN 0-252-08322-9)
- (2012) Loser Sons: Politics and Authority (ISBN 0-252-03664-6)
- (2010) Fighting Theory: In Conversation with Anne Dufourmantelle (ISBN 0-252-07623-0) trans. by Catherine Porter from French
- (2010) Lignes de Front (ISBN 2-234-06404-X) trans. from English by Daniel Loayza
- (2008) The ÜberReader: Selected Works of Avital Ronell (ISBN 0-252-07311-8) (ed. Diane Davis)
- (2007) Life Extreme: An Illustrated Guide to New Life (ISBN 2-914563-34-5) co-authored by Eduardo Kac
- (2006) American philo: Entretiens avec Anne Dufourmantelle (ISBN 2-234-05840-6)
- (2005) The Test Drive (ISBN 0-252-02950-X)
- (2002) Stupidity (ISBN 0-252-07127-1)
- (1994) Finitude's Score: Essays for the End of the Millennium (ISBN 0-8032-8949-9)
- (1992) Crack Wars: Literature, Addiction, Mania (ISBN 0-252-07190-5)
- (1989) The Telephone Book: Technology — Schizophrenia — Electric Speech (ISBN 0-8032-8938-3)
- (1986) Dictations: On Haunted Writing (ISBN 0-8032-8945-6)

=== Articles ===
- (2026) "Justice and Personality: A Promissory Note" (DOI 10.1177/01914537241301003)
