= Dubiecki Manor in Vasylivka =

Ruined castle in Ukraine

Dubiecki Manor
- Палац-Садиба Дубецьких
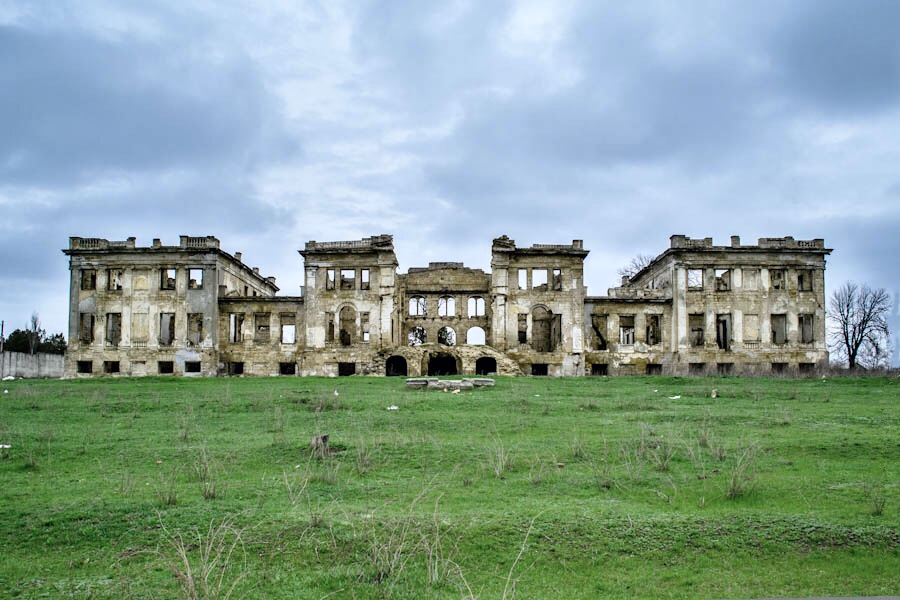
- The view of ruins
- Interactive map of the Dubiecki Manor area
- Alternative names: Wolf's-lair

General information
- Status: Ruined
- Architectural style: Classicist architecture
- Location: Vasylivka, Odesa Oblast, Ukraine
- Coordinates: 46°36′58.64″N 30°17′53.09″E
- Construction started: 1830
- Opened: 1854
- Client: Vasyl Dubiecki

Design and construction
- Architect: Francesco Boffo?

The Dubiecki Manor is an architectural monument located in the village of Vasylivka, Odesa Raion, Odesa Oblast, Ukraine. The manor was built between 1830 and 1854. According to some data, architect Francesco Boffo, famous from his work on the Potemkin Stairs in Odessa, designed the building. The designer of the gardens, situated nearby the manor, was the architect Ivan Dallakva. The first owner was the noblemen Major General Vasyl Dubiecki, who built the manor.

== History ==
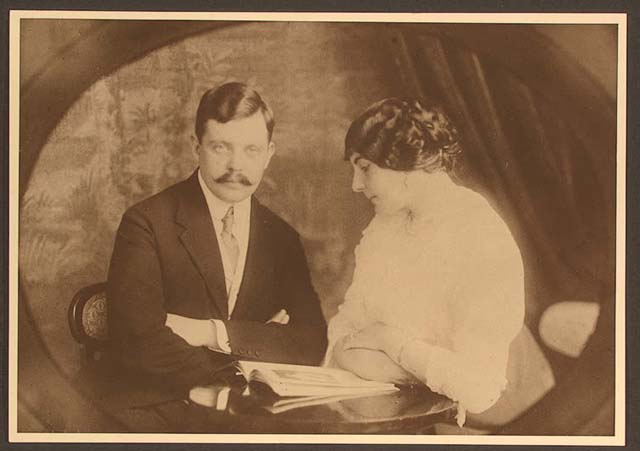
Sergei Pankejeff with his wife, the last owners of the palace

In 1880, after the death of Vasyl Dubiecki, the manor was sold. In 1885, Konstantin Pankejeff became the owner. His son, Sergei Pankejeff, is well known as the "Wolf Man", one of the most famous clients of Sigmund Freud, because he was tormented by a nightmare of wolves watching him for a long time, which Freud interpreted as fear of being eaten by the father. Nicolas Abraham and Maria Torok have later analyzed the dream as testifying to child abuse by the father. Thanks to this fact the manor received the nickname Wolf's-lair.

== Gallery ==
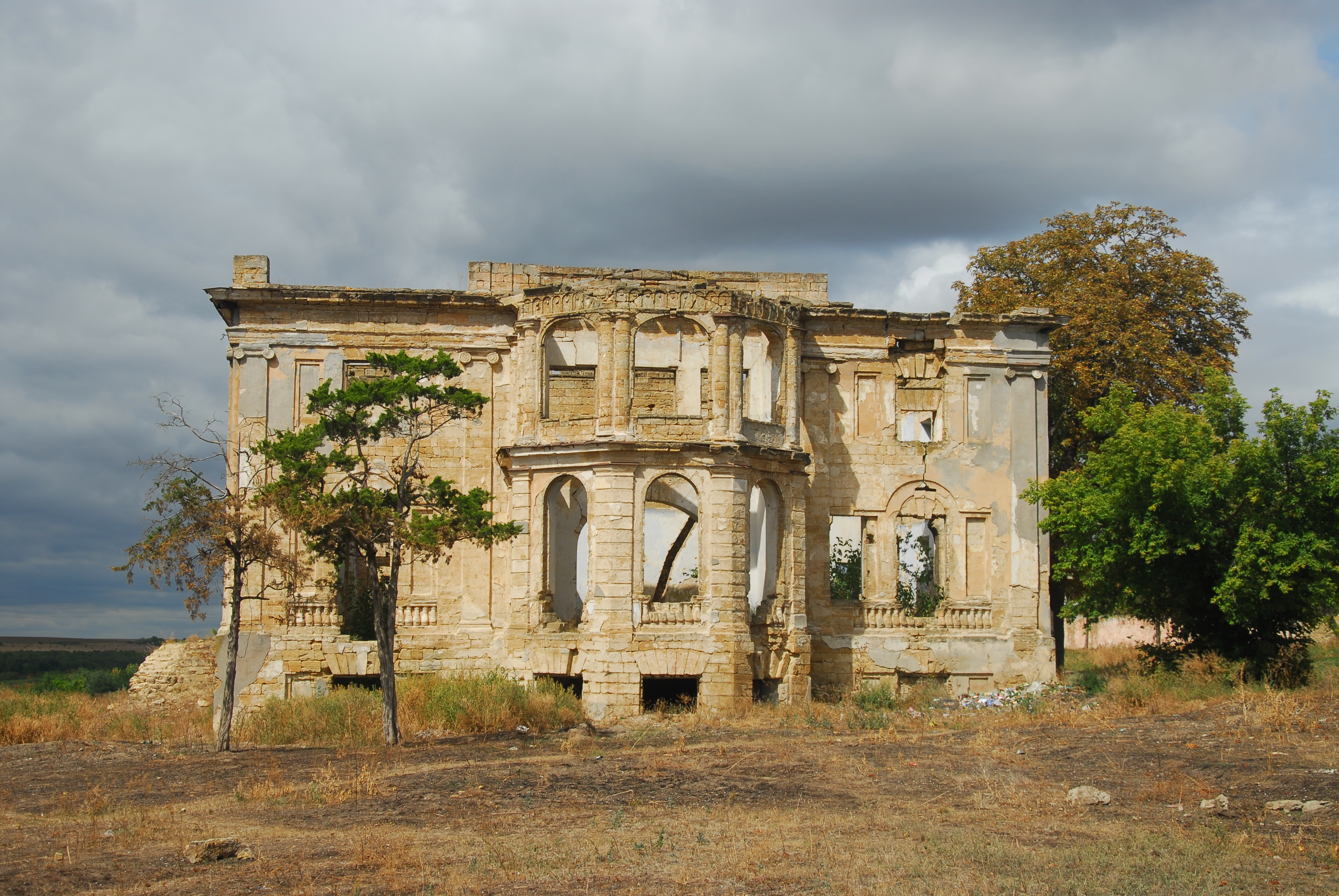

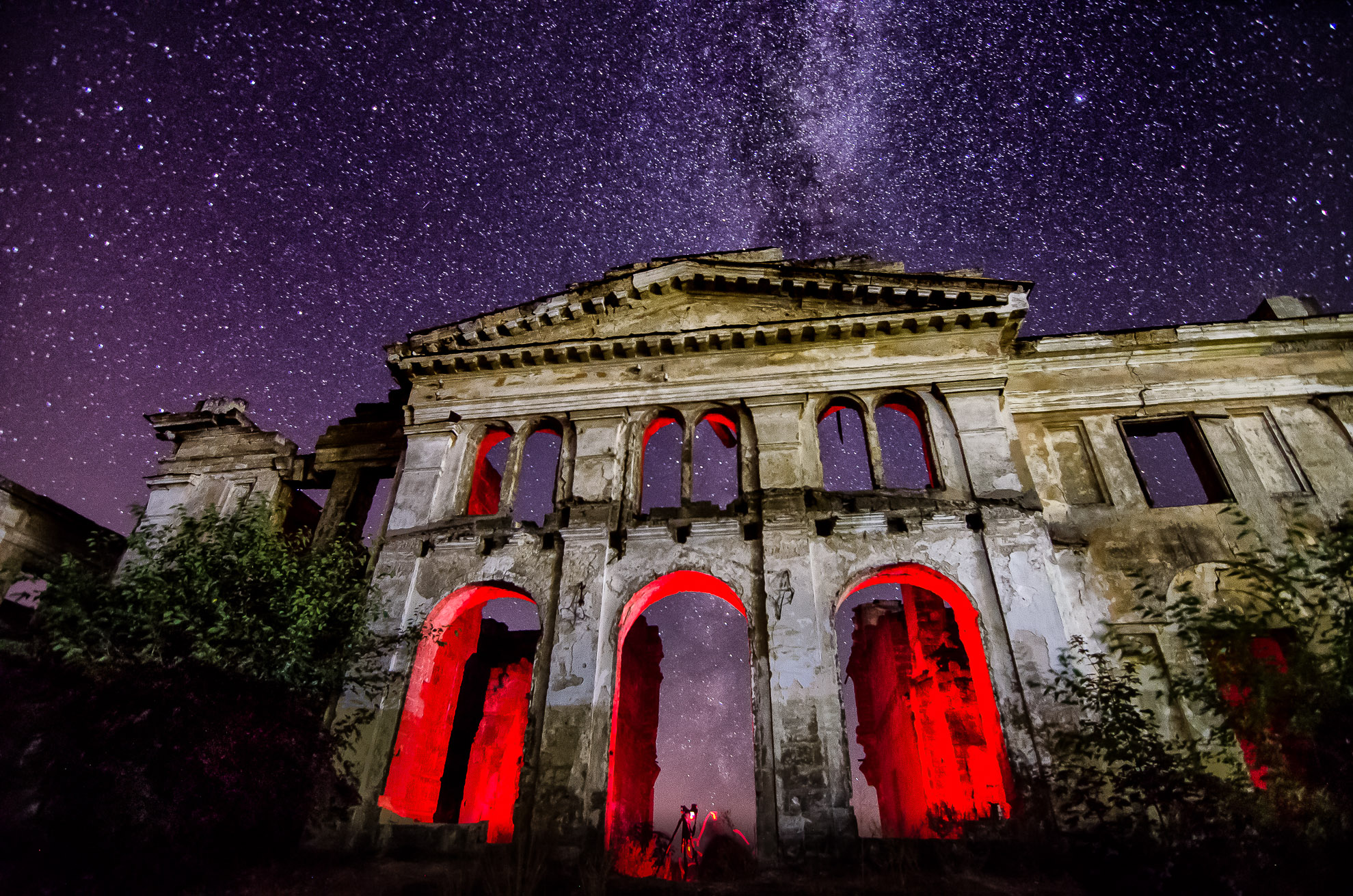

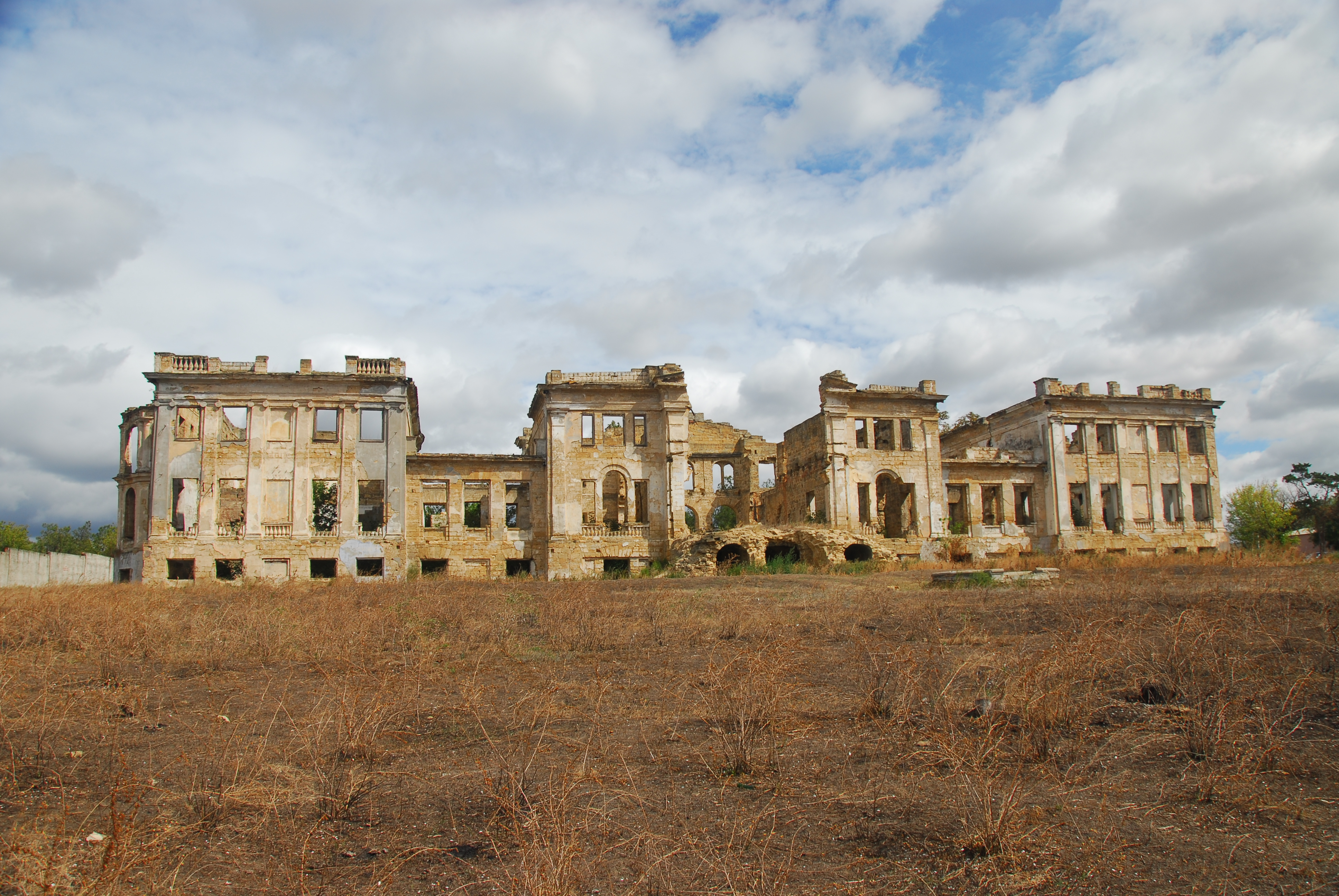

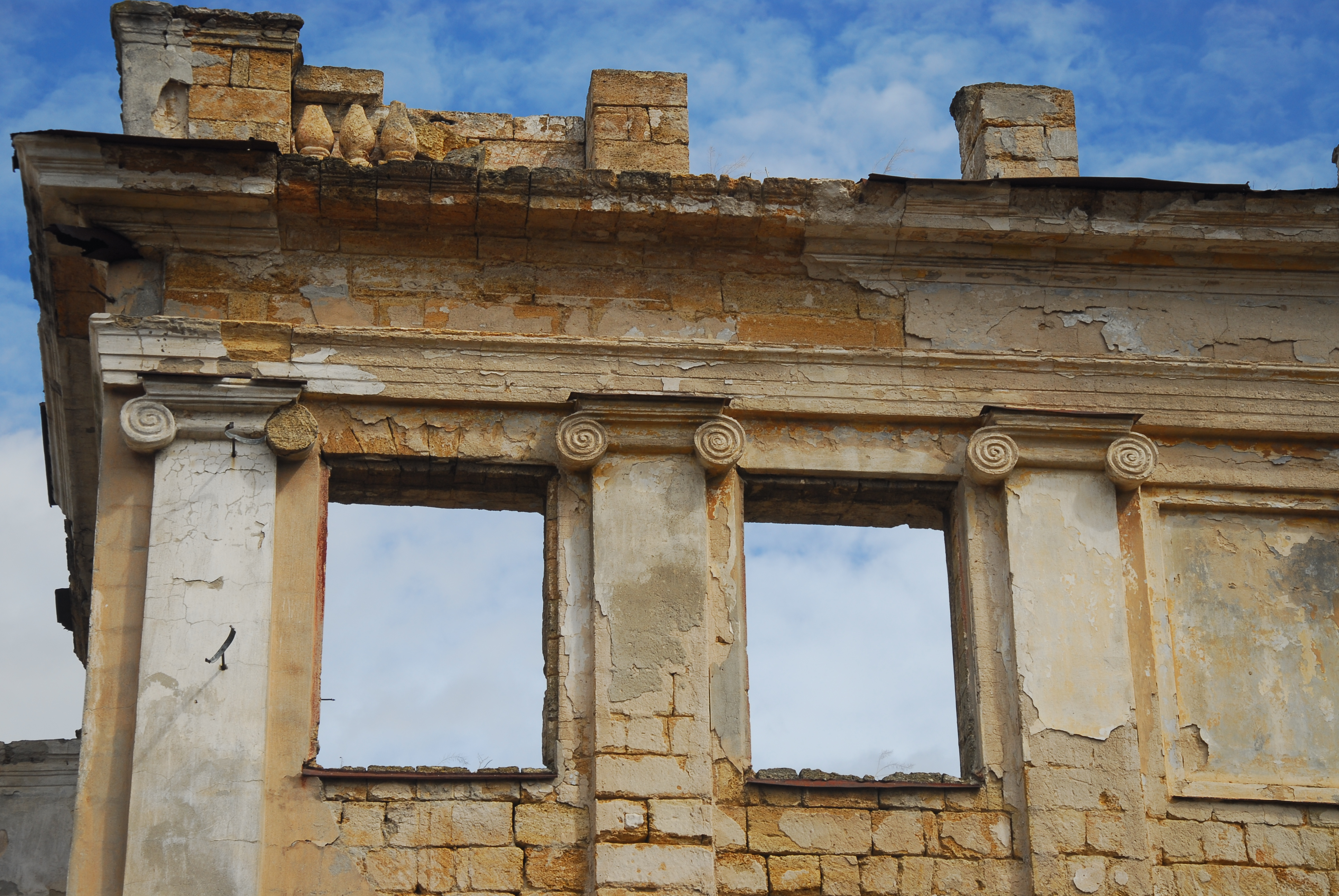

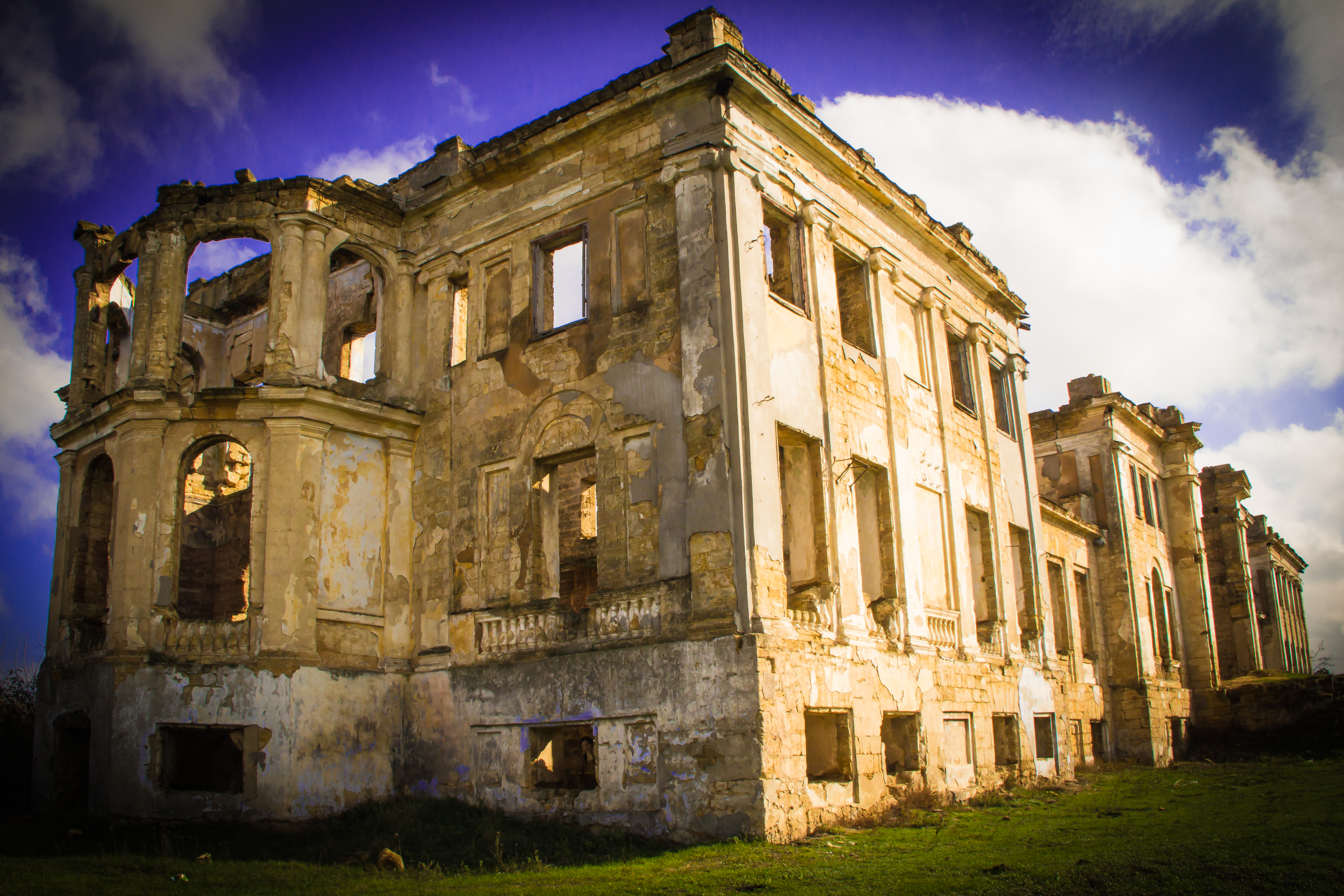

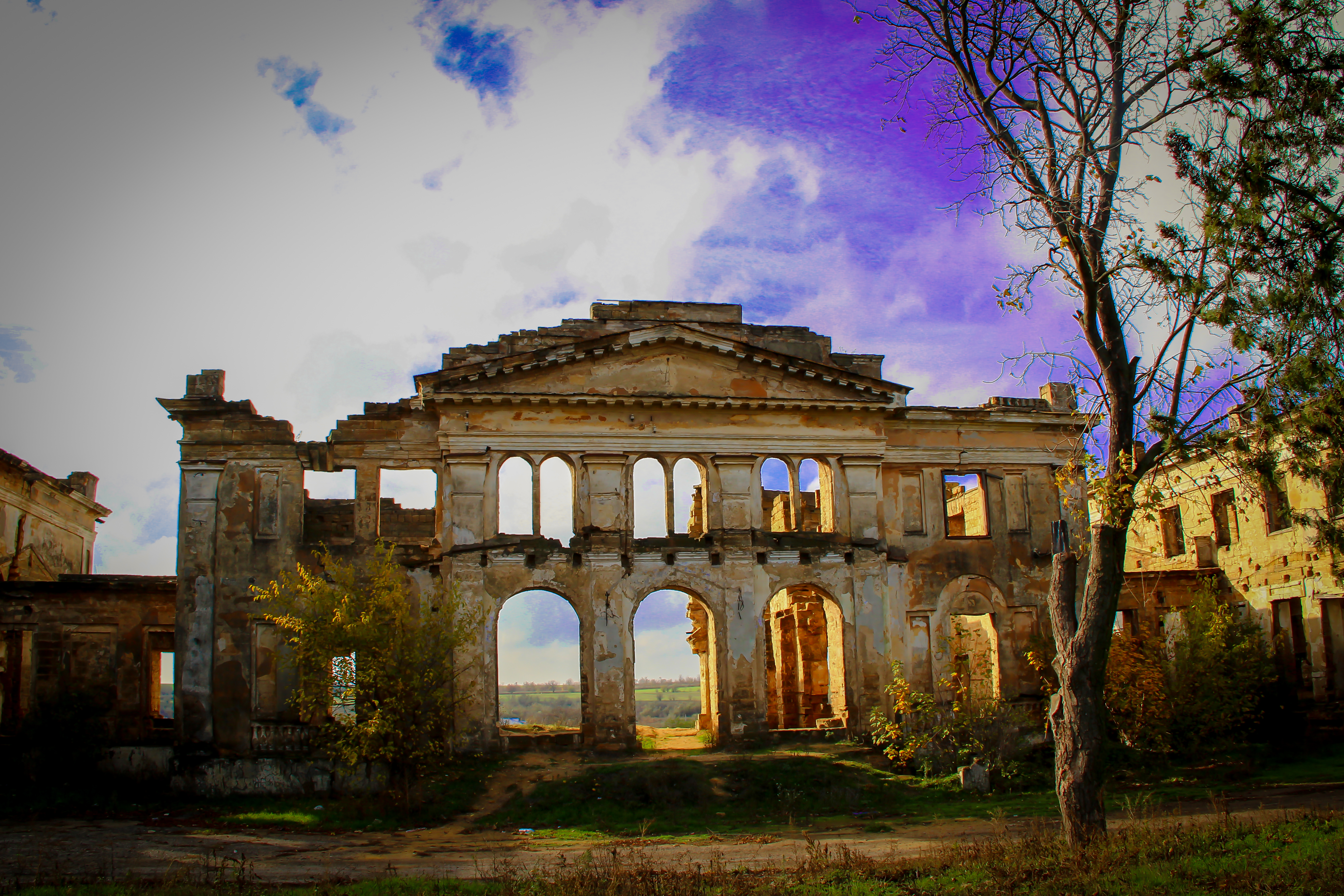

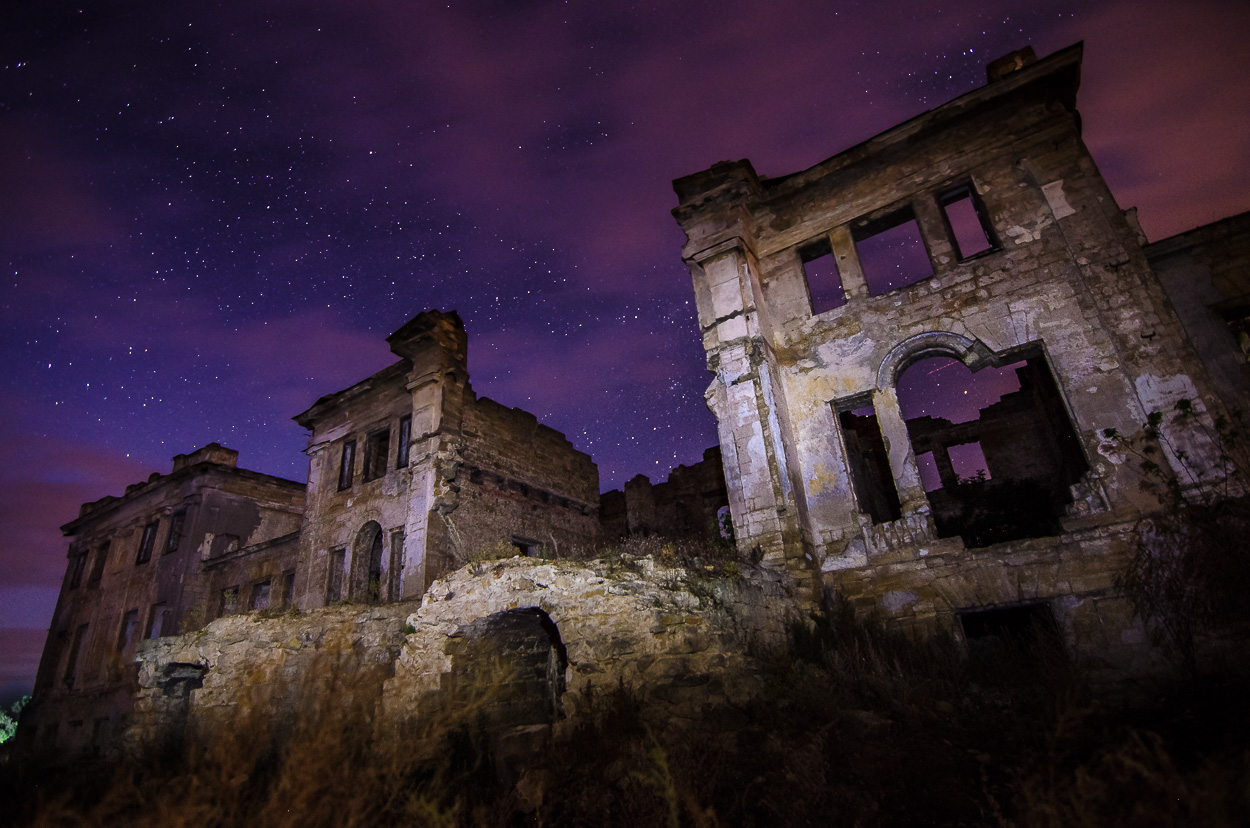

== Sources ==
- Одесская область может лишиться «Волчьего логова» — уникального памятника архитектуры (in Russian)
- Путешествия Историей (in Russian)
- Зимний дворец и Лувр под Одессой (in Russian)
