= Stanley Corngold =

- Born: Stanley Alan Corngold; 1934 (age 91–92); Brooklyn, New York, U.S.
- Occupation: Literary scholar
- Awards: Berlin Prize (2010); Guggenheim Fellowship (1977)

Academic background
- Education: Columbia University; Cornell University
- Doctoral advisor: Paul de Man; Robert M. Adams; O. J. Matthijs Jolles

Academic work
- Sub-discipline: German philosophy
- Institutions: Princeton University
- Doctoral students: Avital Ronell
- Notable works: Franz Kafka: The Office Writings

Stanley Alan Corngold (born 1934) is an American literary scholar. He is an emeritus professor of German and comparative literature at Princeton University.

== Biography ==
Corngold was born in Brooklyn in 1934. In 1957, he received his B.A. from Columbia University, which was interrupted by two years of military service. He then studied Sanskrit at the School of Oriental and African Studies and German at Columbia's graduate school. Having taught at the University of Maryland, Corngold entered Cornell University for his Ph.D. program, receiving his doctorate on Rousseau and Kant under the guidance of Paul de Man, Robert M. Adams, and O. Matthijs Jolles.

In 1966, Corngold became assistant professor of Germanic languages and literatures at Princeton University, and was named full professor in 1981. His research has focused on translating and interpreting the works of Franz Kafka, and he has published widely on modern German writers and thinkers, including Friedrich Nietzsche, Wilhelm Dilthey, Robert Musil, among others. His recent works have focused on the lives and works of philosopher Walter Kaufmann and novelist Thomas Mann.

Among his students at Princeton were Laurence Rickels and Avital Ronell.

Corngold was a visiting fellow at King's College, Cambridge. He received a Guggenheim Fellowship in 1977 and a Berlin Prize in 2010, when he completed a book about Kafka's professional experience as an insurance lawyer . He was elected to the American Academy of Arts and Sciences in 2011.
