= Claude Nachin =

French psychiatrist and psychoanalyst (1930–2025)

Claude Fred Nachin (6 January 1930 – 19 August 2025) was a French psychiatrist and psychoanalyst, the majority of whose writings had affiliations with the joint work of Nicolas Abraham and Maria Torok, particularly with respect to their concept of the intergenerational "phantom".

"The vast majority of clinical case studies of phantom formations and their sequelae have appeared in France. See, especially, Claude Nachin, Les Fantomes de l'âme[Ghosts of the Soul]"

== Background ==
Claude Nachin was born in Valentigney on 6 January 1930. He died in Amiens on 19 August 2025, at the age of 95.

== Career ==
Nachin carried out his medical studies in Lyon between 1949 and 1957, specialising in psychiatry. Nachin became Register in Psychiatry at Vinatier (Lyon-Bron), participating in early work on Largactil, and was a lecturer in psychopathology at the University of Picardie. His one book on psychiatry was published in 1982.

After a psychoanalytic training at the Paris psychoanalytical society, he worked privately in psychoanalysis from 1977–2005, and wrote extensively, particularly on themes concerning mourning.

He was a founding member and president of the European Association Nicolas Abraham and Maria Torok.

== Psychoanalytic influences ==
The clinical practice and theoretical reflections of Nachin are steeped in the work of Torok and Abraham . At the same time, 'the author of Ghosts of the Soul always pays tribute to the work of Ferenczi' - thus forming part of the widespread rehabilitation that would 'make him the most significant forerunner of postmodern psychoanalysis' - while Nachin also recognises the importance of Melanie Klein and Michael Balint

== Flexibility ==
Nachin's thought was characterised by flexibility, and by the belief that listening to the patient comes before any kind of theory. "Psychoanalysis involves the renunciation of all kind of psychiatric diagnosis which always leads to the objectification of the subject and to the distancing of the psychoanalyst," Nachin states.

More explicitly, he claimed: "It is necessary to rid ourselves of any automatic functioning - something which is not easy - in order to be a human (with one's particular experience of life, private, social and professional) who meets another human (with their particular experience). The significance of symptoms and dreams is personal. It is a matter of discovering it in its singularity. Thus, psychoanalysis is to be reinvented, each time for each patient"

Nachin was also known for 'resolutely listening to trauma', and for 'quiet determination and a spirit of precision'

== Freedom from bias ==
In Nachin's view, "Psychoanalysis presupposes the removal of two common prejudices". On the one hand, there is what he calls "The bias of the archaic" - an over-emphasis on the role of early experience: "the importance of the early years of life, discovered by S. Freud and Melanie Klein does not imply that what happens later in the psyche cannot be significant".

Secondly, there is the (Lacanian) bias of the analysts as the subject supposed to know: the self-belief of the analyst should not make him forget that the general elements retrieved in any psychoanalysis are only discovered at the expense of the singular, unique experience that can develop out of the speech of each patient. ".

== Grief ==
Research on the grieving process (especially when obstructed or disrupted) holds a significant place in his work.

"For the dead (the dead as we represent them mentally, so to speak) to be at peace and find peace, and for the survivors to go in peace, it is necessary that words of truth can be spoken and genuine feelings expressed, on the occasion of mourning, among the relatives of the deceased, and shared with the entire community. " (Ghosts of the Soul, pp. 30–31.)

== Phantom ==
Nachin considered that "The tool we need for our work was provided by Nicolas Abraham with the new psychoanalytic concept of 'the work of the phantom in the unconscious'. He described it as 'the work in a subject's unconscious, of an inadmissable dark secret (illegitimacy, incest, crime ...) belonging to another (in a superior position, but also the object of love)'".

He extended Abraham's definition of the phantom to include "work induced in the subject's unconscious by his/her relationship with a parent, or an important love object, who is the carrier of an incomplete mourning process, or of some other unsurmounted trauma - even in the absence of an inadmissable guilty secret. "(Idem, pp. 10–11)

The clinical manifestations of the "phantom" stem from the "constant and desperate psychic work of the child to fill the gap" of incompleteness. From a metapsychological point of view, the ghost is the psychic work of the child undertaken in order "to understand and treat the parent, in the hope of being in turn itself better understood and cared for. "(p. 12)

== Literary contributions ==
Nachin also contributed to the study of Romain Gary.

== See also ==
- Harold Searles
- Personal boundaries

== Works ==
=== Psychiatry ===
- Pour une pratique psychiatrique moderne (Le Centurion, 1982): [For a modern psychiatric practice]

=== Psychoanalysis ===
- Le deuil d'amour (Les éditions universitaires, 1989): [The mourning of love].
- Les fantômes de l'âme (L'Harmattan, 1993): [The ghosts of the soul]
- A l'aide, ya un secret dans le placard (Fleurus, 1999): [Help, there is a secret in the closet].
- La méthode psychanalytique (Armand Colin, 2004): [The psychoanalytic method].

==== As editor ====
- Co-editor of the Nicolas Abraham and Maria Torok collection (with Jean-Claude Rouchy), the first title of which was published in 2010: Barbro Sylwan and Philippe Réfabert, Freud, Fliess, Ferenczi: The ghosts that haunt psychoanalysis (Éditions Hermann, 2010).
