= Vyhoda rural hromada =

Coordinates: 46°36′N 30°23′E

Vyhoda rural hromada Вигодянська сільська громада
- Hromada
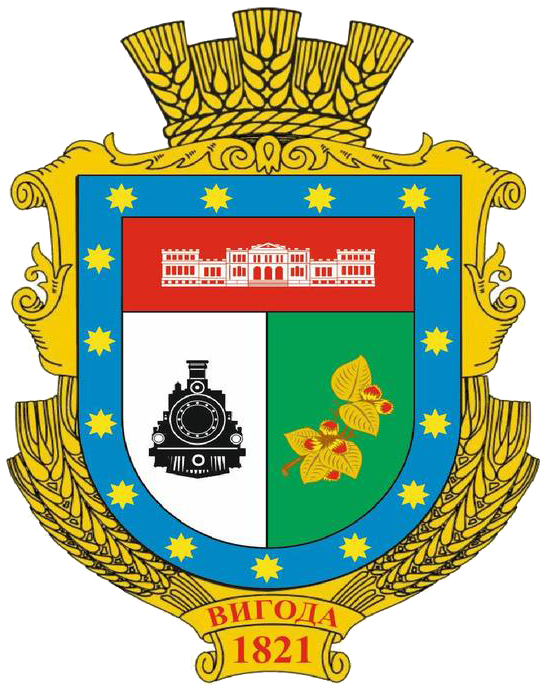
- Coat of arms
- Interactive map of Vyhoda rural hromada
- Country: Ukraine
- Oblast: Odesa Oblast
- Raion: Odesa Raion
- Admin. center: Vyhoda

Area
  - Total: 288.8 km^{2} (111.5 sq mi)

Population (2020)
  - Total: 12,044
  - Density: 41.70/km^{2} (108.0/sq mi)
- CATOTTG code: UA51100090000094901
- Settlements: 15
- Rural settlements: 1
- Villages: 14

Vyhoda rural hromada (Ukrainian: Вигодянська сільська громада) is a hromada in Odesa Raion of Odesa Oblast in southwestern Ukraine. Population: 12,044 (2020 est.)

The hromada consists of one rural settlement (Doslidne), and 14 villages:

- Berezan
- Chervona Hirka
- Dobrozhanove
- Zoriane
- Kamianka
- Kurhan
- Mykhailivka
- Paliivka
- Petrove
- Sekretarivka
- Soniachne
- Vazhne
- Vasylivka
- Vyhoda (seat of administration)

== Links ==
- https://decentralization.gov.ua/newgromada/4324#
- картка Постанови ВР
