= Jack Greenberg =

American lawyer and activist

President of the NAACP Legal Defense and Educational Fund
- In office 1961–1984
- Preceded by: Thurgood Marshall
- Succeeded by: Julius L. Chambers

Personal details
- Born: December 22, 1924 New York City, New York, U.S.
- Died: October 12, 2016 (aged 91) New York City, New York, U.S.
- Relatives: Daniel S. Greenberg (brother)
- Education: Columbia University (BA, LLB)
- Awards: Presidential Citizens Medal

Jack Greenberg (December 22, 1924 – October 12, 2016) was an American attorney and legal scholar. He was the Director-Counsel of the NAACP Legal Defense Fund from 1961 to 1984, succeeding Thurgood Marshall. He was involved in numerous crucial cases, including Brown v. Board of Education, which ended segregation in public schools. In all, he argued 40 civil rights cases before the U.S. Supreme Court, and won almost all of them.

He was Alphonse Fletcher Jr. Professor of Law Emeritus at Columbia Law School, and had previously served as dean of Columbia College and vice dean of Columbia Law School. He died on October 12, 2016.

== Early life ==
Greenberg was born into a Jewish family in Brooklyn, New York on December 22, 1924. His brother was science journalist Daniel S. Greenberg. They grew up in Bensonhurst, Brooklyn and near Mosholu Parkway in the Bronx.

During World War II, Greenberg served in the United States Navy and fought at Okinawa and Iwo Jima. Greenberg commanded a landing craft in the invasion of Iheya Jima, one of the final campaigns of the war. During his service, he was disturbed by racial prejudice he perceived in the Navy, and was threatened with a court-martial for shouting at a superior officer in defense of a black crewman that he felt was being mistreated.

After an interruption due to his war service Greenberg graduated from Columbia College with a B.A. in 1945. He further received an LL.B. from Columbia Law School in 1948, and an LL.D. (an honorary degree) from Columbia Law in 1984.

== Career ==
=== Civil and human rights lawyer for the NAACP Legal Defense Fund ===
Greenberg became the only white legal counselor for the NAACP Legal Defense and Educational Fund ("LDF") in 1949, and, in 1961, succeeded Thurgood Marshall as LDF's Director-Counsel.

Greenberg recalled his earliest arguments before the Supreme Court, saying:

It was like a religious experience; the first few times I was there I was full of awe. I had an almost tactile feeling. The first time I was in the Court, I wasn't arguing. I felt as if I were in a synagogue, and reached to see whether or not I had a yarmulke on. I thought I ought to have one on.

=== Important civil rights cases argued for the Legal Defense Fund ===
==== Brown v. Board of Education, 1954 ====

In perhaps his greatest stride, Greenberg argued Brown v. Board of Education in 1954 before the Supreme Court as co-counsel with Thurgood Marshall. Brown declared state laws establishing separate public schools for black and white students to be unconstitutional. In Brown, Greenberg found social scientists and other authorities from the fields of psychology and sociology who addressed the detrimental effects forced segregation could have on young public school students.

==== Meredith v. Fair, 1962 ====
In 1962, Greenberg argued Meredith v. Fair, a case which became a first step in integrating the University of Mississippi by allowing the enrollment of student James Meredith.

Other civil rights cases Greenberg argued include Alexander v. Holmes County Board of Education in 1969, which ordered the end of segregated school systems "at once", and Griggs v. Duke Power Company in 1971, which outlawed basing employment and promotion decisions on the results of tests with a discriminatory impact.

In 1972, he argued Furman v. Georgia (1972), in which the Court held that the death penalty as it was then applied was a violation of the "cruel and unusual punishment" clause of the Eighth Amendment.

=== Founding member of other civil and human rights groups ===
Greenberg was a founding member of the Mexican American Legal Defense and Education Fund (MALDEF) and of Human Rights Watch.

=== Educator ===
Greenberg was an adjunct professor at Columbia Law School from 1970 to 1984, a visiting lecturer at Yale Law School in 1971, and a visiting professor at College of the City of New York in 1977.

In 1982, he was appointed to co-teach Julius L. Chambers' class on race law at Harvard Law School. The university declined to replace Greenberg with a black professor, so black students boycotted the class. When asked if he was frightened to pass through a group of protesters on his way to class the first day, Greenberg said, "No, I was on the beach at Iwo Jima."

Greenberg left LDF in 1984 to become a professor and Vice Dean at Columbia Law School. He served as Dean of Columbia College from 1989 to 1993. Greenberg's teaching interests included constitutional law, civil rights, and human rights law, civil procedure, "Kafka and the Law", and South Africa's post-apartheid constitution. As of fall 2013, Greenberg still taught at Columbia Law School, and served as a senior director of LDF.

He was also a distinguished visiting professor at University of Tokyo's Faculty of Law in 1993-94 and at Saint Louis University School of Law in 1994, and a visiting professor at Lewis and Clark Law School in 1994 and 1996, at Princeton University in 1995, at LMU Munich in 1998, at the University of Tokyo in 1996 and 1998, at the University of Erlangen–Nuremberg from 1999 to 2000, and at the Hebrew University of Jerusalem in 2005.

=== Author ===
Greenberg had varied intellectual interests: aside from several books on law and civil rights, including Crusaders in the Courts, he wrote a cookbook (Dean Cuisine, with Harvard Law School Dean James Vorenberg), and appeared as a panelist for a New York Times tasting of Oregon pinot noir. He also edited Franz Kafka: The Office Writings (Princeton: Princeton University Press, 2008) with two other scholars.

== Awards and honors ==
- In 2001, Greenberg was awarded a Presidential Citizens Medal. President Bill Clinton commented "In the courtroom and the classroom, Jack Greenberg has been a crusader for freedom and equality for more than half a century."
- In 1998, Greenberg was elected a fellow of the American Academy of Arts and Sciences.
- In 1996, Greenberg received the Thurgood Marshall Award of the American Bar Association for his long-term contributions to the advancement of civil rights, civil liberties, and human rights in the U.S.
- Greenberg received an honorary Doctor of Laws degree from University of Notre Dame in 2005 and an honorary degree from Howard University in 2004.
- In December 2009, Greenberg received Columbia Law School's Lawrence A. Wien Prize for Social Responsibility. In January 2014, a daylong symposium in his Greenberg's honor was held at Columbia Law School.
- In May 2014, Greenberg was honored by President Barack Obama on the 60th Anniversary of the 1954 Brown v. Board of Education Supreme Court decision that ended segregation in public schools. Greenberg argued the case as co-council with Thurgood Marshall.

== Publications (selected list) ==
- Race Relations and American Law (1959)
- Litigation for Social Change (1973)
- Cases and Materials on Judicial Process and Social Change (1976)
- Dean Cuisine: The Liberated Man's Guide to Fine Cooking (with Vorenberg, 1991)
- Crusaders in the Courts: How a Dedicated Band of Lawyers Fought for the Civil Rights Revolution (1994)
- Crusaders in the Courts; Legal Battles of the Civil Rights Movement (2004)
- Brown v. Board of Education; Witness to A Landmark Decision (2004)

== See also ==
- African American–Jewish relations

Academic offices
Preceded by Robert Pollack	Dean of Columbia College; 1989–93	Succeeded by Steven Marcus
