= Von Saltza =

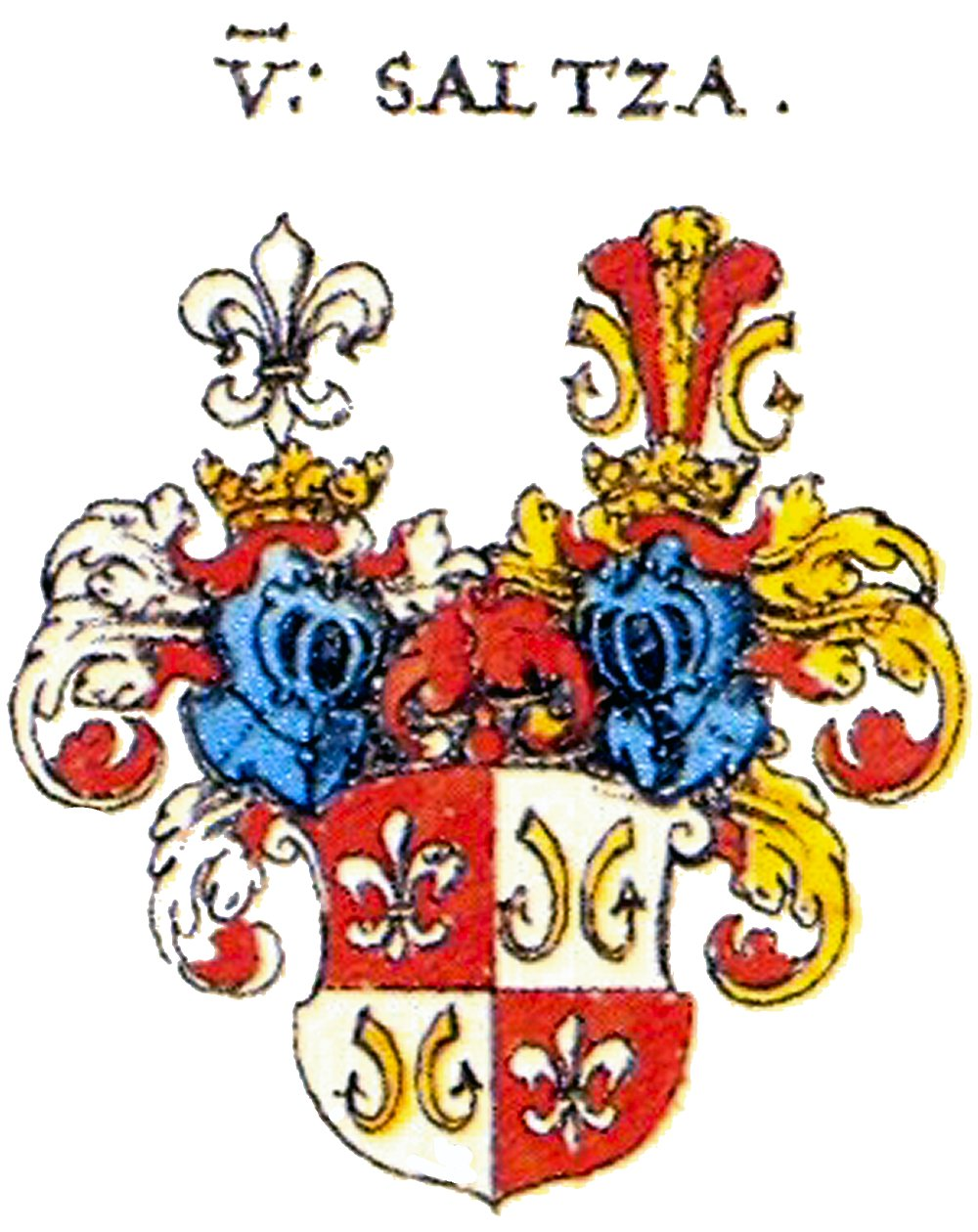
Coat of Arms of the Saltza family

The Saltza family (also spelled Von Salza or Von Saltza) is an old German noble family, originally from Thuringia. Throughout centuries, members of the family also became part of the Baltic-German, Russian, Bohemian and Swedish nobility. Members of the Swedish were granted the title of Count in Sweden, members of Russian line were awarded with the title of Baron in Russia, while members of the German line in Saxony held the title of Freiherr. There were also many petite lines of the family which belonged to an untitled nobility.

== Notable members ==
- Anton von Saltza (1843–1916), Russian general
- Carl Frederick von Saltza (1858–1905), Swedish-American artist and portrait painter
- Chris von Saltza (born 1944), American swimmer
- Philip von Saltza (1885–1980), Swedish-born American artist and muralist
- Anna Catharina, Freiin von Salza und Lichtenau (b. 1981), wife of Prince Friedrich Wilhelm of Prussia (b. 1979)
