= Jan Jolles =

German communist activist in South America (1906–1942)

Jan Andries Jolles
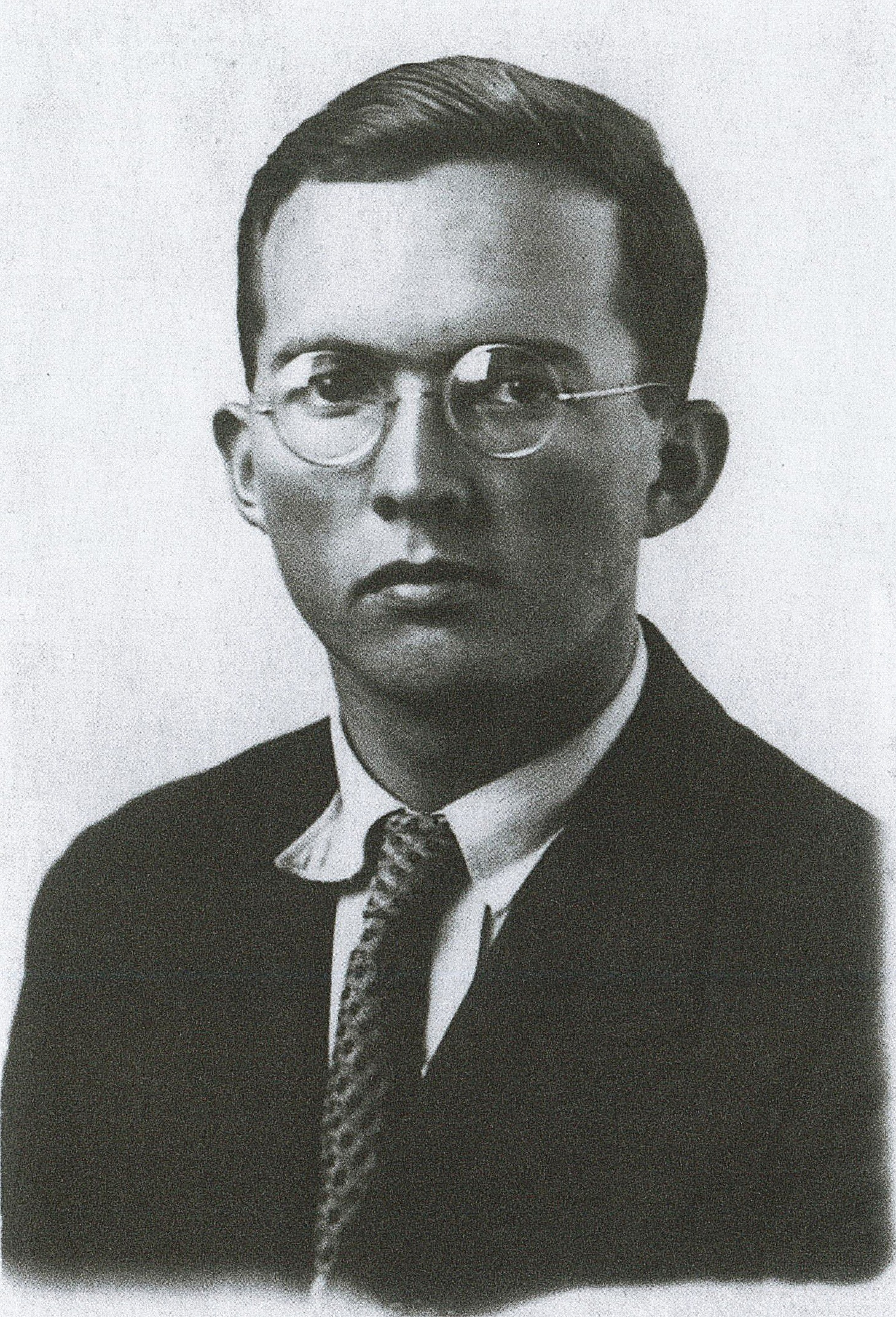
- Jan Andries Jolles (1933)
- Born: Jan Andries Jolles; April 13, 1906; Freiburg im Breisgau, German Empire
- Died: April 5, 1942 (aged 35); Quito, Ecuador
- Other names: Alonso, Emilio, Eoles, Macario, Manuel Cazón; false identity: Manuel Enrique Casson Arribar
- Occupations: Communist activist; cadre of the Communist International

Jan Andries Jolles (born 13 April 1906 in Freiburg im Breisgau; died 5 April 1942 in Quito) was a German communist activist associated with the Communist International (Comintern). He became known for his activities in South America during the 1920s and 1930s.

In Argentina, he served on the Central Committee (1928) and the Politburo (1931) of the Communist Party of Argentina (PCA) and was a delegate to the First Latin American Communist Conference (Buenos Aires, 1929).

Between 1933 and 1935 he was sent by the Comintern to the Communist Party of Brazil (PCB) as an instructor to its Central Committee. In subsequent years he lived in Chile and Ecuador, where he published literary criticism under the pseudonym Manuel Cazón. He died in Quito in 1942 following gastric surgery.

== Origins and youth ==
Jolles was the son of the Dutch Germanist André Jolles (1874–1946), professor in Leipzig and author of Einfache Formen (1930), and of Mathilde (“Tilli”) Mönckeberg (1879–1958), daughter of Hamburg mayor Johann Georg Mönckeberg.

Born in Freiburg im Breisgau, he spent his childhood between his native city, Wannsee (Berlin), and Hamburg. He was the fourth of six children from his father's first marriage: Hendrik (1901–1902), Hendrika Jeltje “Jella” (1903–2001), Jacoba Jennigje “Bota” (1904–1988), Otto Jolle Matthijs “Thijs” (1911–1968) and Ruth Huberta Mathilde (1915–1997).

In 1914 André Jolles enlisted in the German army, and the family obtained Prussian citizenship. After his parents separated in 1918, Jan moved to Leipzig to live with his father and stepmother, Margarethe “Grittli” Boecklen. From the second marriage came Barbara Sibylle (1918–2006), Jolle (1921–1942), Jacob Cornelis (1922–2008), and Eva-Gertrud (b. 1930).

At 13, Jolles attempted to leave school and for a time worked in a factory as a bookbinder. In parallel he engaged with the Wandervogel youth movement. His father's influence was ambivalent: André Jolles had been close to the SPD and the KPD and spread communist ideas in the family, but abruptly joined the NSDAP in 1933 and in 1944 received the Goethe-Medaille of the Nazi regime. The father's allegiance to Nazism contrasted with Jan's communist engagement and—together with the death of his half-brother Jolle Jolles in the Battle of Stalingrad—deepened political divisions within the family.

== Uruguay and Argentina (1924–1933) ==
In growing conflict with his father, Jolles moved from Leipzig to Amsterdam in early 1924. Dissatisfied with life in the Dutch capital, he considered emigrating to England but on 25 June 1924 boarded the Flandria bound for South America. After a brief stop in São Paulo, he went to Uruguay, where he joined the Communist Party of Uruguay (PCU). He worked at the printing press of the communist newspaper, lived in extreme poverty, and depended on financial help from his mother in Germany.

In April 1925 he clandestinely entered Argentina, joined the Communist Party of Argentina (PCA), and sought contact with Orestes Ghioldi. Between 1925 and 1930 he worked as an instructor, typesetter, and journalist in Buenos Aires, Rosario, Santiago del Estero and Tucumán. He also helped organize the Communist Youth in Brazil’s Rio Grande do Sul. His rise was rapid: in 1928 he entered the Central Committee and in 1929 was a delegate to the First Latin American Communist Conference in Buenos Aires.

The Uriburu coup in September 1930 intensified repression. Jolles was arrested and deported to Montevideo, from where he continued to collaborate with the movement. In the Uruguayan capital he worked at the South American Secretariat of the Communist International (SSAIC), alongside August Guralski (“Rústico”) and Arthur Ewert.

In May 1931 he returned to Argentina as a delegate of the South American Secretariat to attend the PCA’s clandestine conference in Rosario. There he was confirmed as a Politburo member. Identified with the “class against class” line of the Comintern’s so-called “Third Period”—which advocated frontal struggle against socialists and rejection of non-communist alliances—he defended replacing Rodolfo Ghioldi in the party leadership, accusing him of “reformism”. Ghioldi, a central figure of Argentine communism since the PCA’s founding, responded with Guralski and Ewert and reversed the decision: it was Jolles who was removed, accused of factionalism and a “Trotskyist attitude”. Sent to Tucumán for grassroots work, he was again detained in 1932, transferred to Buenos Aires, and sentenced to 18 months in prison.

In April 1933, after a year incarcerated, he was deported as an “undesirable foreigner” to Germany aboard the Vigo.

== Germany and Moscow (1933) ==
Back in Germany in April 1933, Jolles found the country already under the Nazi regime. Expecting to be arrested upon arriving in Hamburg, he was released and spent a few months with his mother. The absence of an extradition treaty with Argentina, ignorance of his activities by German authorities, and NS-leaning family ties may have helped him pass unnoticed. In Hamburg he tried to rejoin the local communist cell, but the climate of persecution and the lack of information about his militant past generated suspicion and hindered effective integration.

Between May and August 1933 he obtained a false Spanish passport in the name of Manuel Enrique Casson Arribar—an identity he kept until his death. He decided to leave Germany—reportedly because even his brother had threatened to denounce him. In August he went to Moscow, where he was received by Georgy Borisovich Skalov, known as Sinani, deputy head of the Comintern’s Latin American Secretariat, and lodged in the Hotel Lux. There he wrote a political autobiographical statement for the Comintern files and underwent rigorous evaluation. The disputes fought in Argentina were revisited by leaders such as Victorio Codovilla and Orestes Ghioldi, then based in Moscow, even as his militant dedication was acknowledged. In this critical yet potentially rehabilitative setting he received the assignment to work in Brazil as an instructor to the PCB.

== Brazil (1933–1935) ==
Jolles arrived in Brazil at the end of 1933 tasked with preparing an insurrection against Getúlio Vargas and projecting Luís Carlos Prestes as a political leader. Funded by the Comintern, he lived in better conditions than in Argentina and Uruguay. He first stayed in hotels and later in the house of sympathizer Adolpho Carvalho, in Copacabana, which became a clandestine meeting point.

Within PCB plenums he played a central role, as in the removal of Fernando de Lacerda as general secretary, based on a medical report later contested. Jolles was also linked to the decision that resulted in the brutal murder of activist Tobias Warchavsky in 1934; he was denounced and convicted in absentia by Brazilian courts. (Note: Between the failure of the 1935 Communist uprising in Brazil and the early 1940s, imprisoned communists implicated Jolles as part of an internal “tribunal” that decided on the execution of Tobias Warchavsky. On 17 December 1942 the Brazilian National Security Court sentenced him, together with Honório de Freitas Guimarães, Vicente Santos and Adolfo Barbosa Bastos, to 25 years in prison. At the time of the sentence, the court did not know that Jolles had died in Ecuador months earlier.)

Internal reports described him as optimistic, energetic, and a disciplinarian, but also accused him of authoritarianism, “leftist” excesses, and carelessness with correspondence, some of which was intercepted. He was at one point considered the PCB’s “most powerful man”, but accused of delaying Prestes’s formal entry into the party to preserve his own centrality.

At the end of 1934 or beginning of 1935, he was recalled to leave Brazil and in April 1935 went to Ecuador via Chile. His work was criticized in reports sent to Moscow. The recall occurred months before the 1935 Communist uprising in Brazil, leaving him outside the episode.

== Chile and Ecuador (1935–1942) ==
After leaving Brazil in April 1935, Jolles was supposed to continue to Ecuador, but chose to stay several months in Santiago (Chile). He collaborated with the newspaper Frente Único of the Communist Party of Chile and took part in party meetings; his harsh criticism of the leadership led to resignations.

In April 1935 he sailed from Valparaíso to Guayaquil, settling in Ecuador, then under the dictatorship of Federico Páez. He taught philosophy at the Colegio Nacional Vicente Rocafuerte and published literary criticism in the weekly Noticia under the pseudonym Manuel Cazón.

Repression forced him back to Chile, where he lived between 1936 and 1937. He became embroiled in disputes with local leaders, was subject to a disciplinary inquiry, and in 1937 was expelled from the Comintern under accusations of “Trotskyism”, factionalism, and alleged links to the Gestapo and to Sinani, who by then had fallen into disgrace during the Great Purge.

Back in Ecuador, he remained active in cultural circles (Noticia; Plan, 1938). The Molotov–Ribbentrop Pact of 1939 deepened his break with communism. Between 1939 and 1941 reports place him again in Chile managing a pub and a cinema. In his final years he settled in Quito among intellectual circles, away from party activity.

== Death ==
In Quito, under the name Manuel Casson (or Cazón), Jolles died on 5 April 1942 at age 35 following surgery for complications of gastric and duodenal ulcers. He was buried in the San Diego cemetery on 6 April under a false identity.

During hospitalization he wrote fragments of an autobiography, Generación perdida. His death was briefly reported by El Comercio.

Despite official documentation, various versions about his death circulated. Eudocio Ravines spoke of “strange and dramatic circumstances”, a version echoed by William Waack and other authors; and Isidoro Gilbert suggested Jolles had been a “double agent”,. Other speculations ranged from an empty coffin and later transfer of remains by friends to a death “half mad” in Milagro or a flight to escape the “long arm of Moscow”. These hypotheses are generally rejected. His expulsion from the Comintern and conflicting accusations contributed to an atmosphere of suspicion.

== Personal life ==
In 1927 he married María Banegas Herrera in Argentina; they had two children and separated in 1934. In Brazil he had extramarital relationships, including with the wife of Adolpho Carvalho, and made advances toward other women in militant circles.

In 1935, in Ecuador, he partnered with Leonor Azucena Vera; their son Fernando Cazón Vera, later a poet of the Guayaquil Group, was born of this relationship. The couple separated in 1940.

== Legacy ==
Despite activity across several Latin American countries, Jolles’s trajectory remained little known in his native country. It was only consolidated by the work of Walter Thys (2012), based on Russian archives, family collections, and South American documentation.

== Bibliography ==
- Thys, Walter (2012). Vom Wandervogel zum "Compañero": Jan Andries Jolles (1906–1942), Soldat der Weltrevolution. Leipzig: Leipziger Universitätsverlag. ISBN 9783865835314.
- Waack, William (1993). Camaradas: Nos arquivos de Moscou. A história secreta da revolução brasileira de 1935 (in Portuguese). São Paulo: Companhia das Letras. ISBN 9788571643420.
