= Vasylivka, Odesa Raion, Odesa Oblast =

Rural locality in Odesa Oblast, Ukraine

Vasylivka Василівка
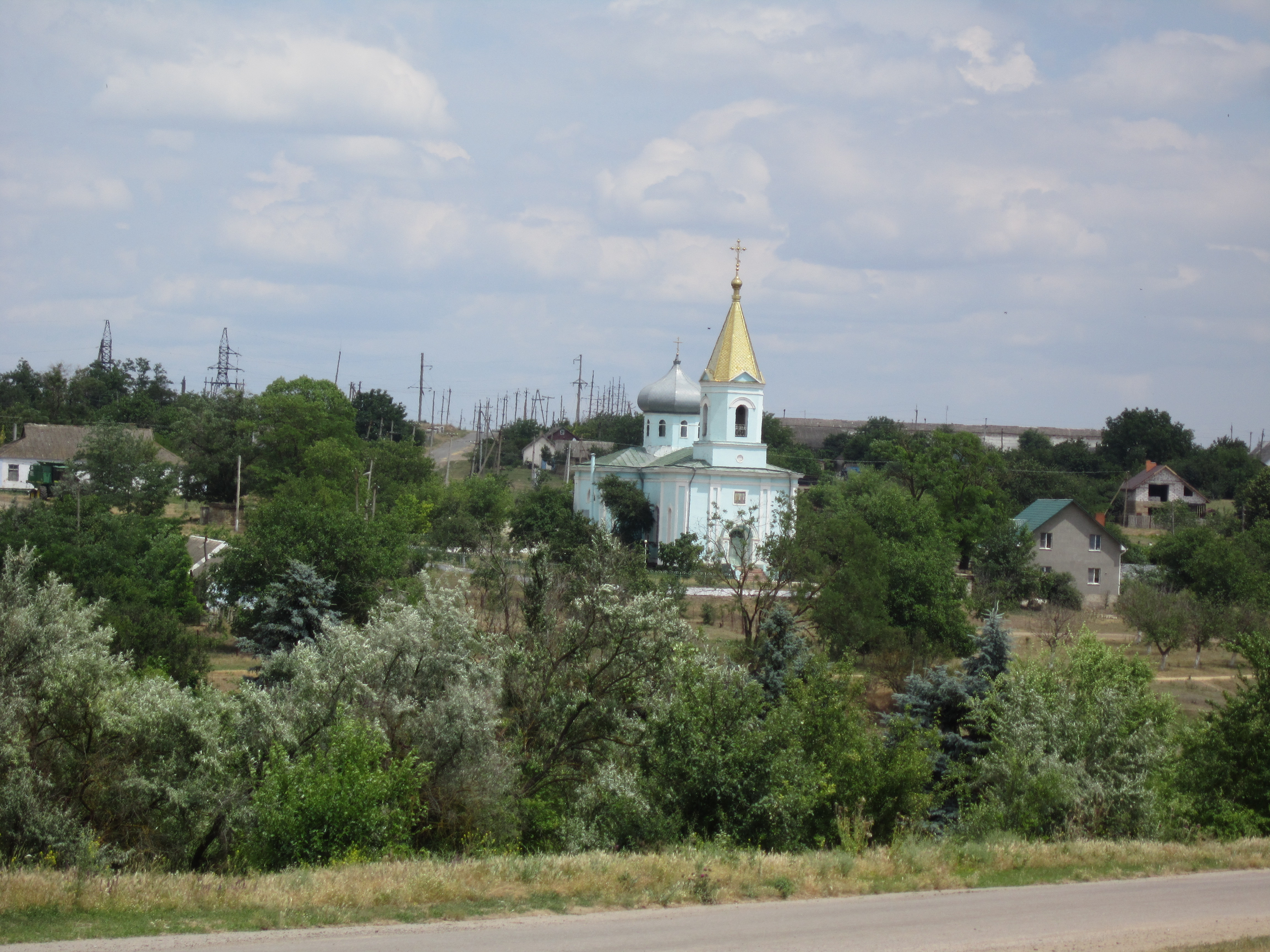
- View of the village

- Location in Odesa Oblast#Location in Ukraine Vasylivka (Ukraine)
- Coordinates: 46°36′23″N 30°18′15″E
- Country: Ukraine
- Oblast: Odesa Oblast
- Raion: Odesa Raion
- Hromada: Vyhoda rural hromada
- Village founded: 1849

Area
  - Total: 1.84 km^{2} (0.71 sq mi)

Population (2001)
  - Total: 2,068
- Time zone: UTC+2 (EET (Kyiv))
  - Summer (DST): UTC+3 (EEST)
- Postal code: 67613
- Area code: +380 4852

Vasylivka (Ukrainian: Василівка) is a village in Odesa Raion, Odesa Oblast, Ukraine. It belongs to Vyhoda rural hromada, one of the hromadas of Ukraine. The current estimated population is 2068 (as of 2001).

== History ==
The village was founded in 1849. The Dubiecki Manor, located in the village, was built between 1830 and 1854. According to some data, architect Francesco Boffo, known for his work on Potemkin Stairs in Odesa, designed the building. The designer of the gardens, situated near by the manor, was architect Ivan Dallakva. The first owner was the noblemen major general Vasyl Dubiecki.

Until 18 July 2020, Vasylivka belonged to Biliaivka Raion. The raion was abolished in July 2020 as part of the administrative reform of Ukraine, which reduced the number of raions of Odesa Oblast to seven. The area of Biliaivka Raion was merged into Odesa Raion.

== Notable people ==
- Sergei Pankejeff, Russian aristocrat from Odesa best known for being a patient of Sigmund Freud, who gave him the pseudonym of Wolf Man (der Wolfsmann).

== Sources ==
- Одесская область может лишиться «Волчьего логова» — уникального памятника архитектуры (in Russian)
- Путешествия Историей (in Russian)
- Зимний дворец и Лувр под Одессой (in Russian)
