= Simple Forms (book) =

1929 book by Andre Jolles

- Author: Andre Jolles
- Original title: Einfache Formen
- Translator: Peter J. Schwartz
- Subject: Literary theory, Literary criticism, Genre theory
- Publication date: 1929
- English publication date: 2017
- Pages: 230

Simple Forms (German: Einfache Formen) is a book in literary criticism and genre theory written by Andre Jolles.

== Background ==
His text is heavily influenced by Georg Wilhelm Friedrich Hegel and other tendencies in German idealism, primarily in his notion of uncovering the Geist via literature. Although inspired by other German philosophers (such as Georg Simmel), he ultimately takes a more conservative approach in developing his theories using German idealism.

== Contents and summary ==
In the book's introduction, Andre seeks to analyze the "simple forms" of legend, saga, myth, riddle, proverb (or saying in the original text), "case", memorabila, fairy tale, and joke in terms of a reflection of man's engagement with the material world. He starts by giving an example of a village with three classes of people: the farmers, the artisans, and the priests. The farmers' and artisans' roles in the village are to produce and manufacture material goods for the village, whereas the priest's role is to provide meaning to the lives of the villagers; the priest's role is then compared to literature's role in society.

=== Legend ===
He teaches that legends are a means for societies to canonize and preserve social norms, virtues, and moral norms, as well as "great men" in the society, via them being objectified to a maximal extent in the culture's chosen "big men". He gives the example of the Catholic Church producing new saints and their worship (using relics) after the saints' deaths. The legend is also never created for its own sake; rather, it is created (or appraised) by the members of the society for the members of the society. The legend (and/or the object of the legend) experiences what is called imitatio; imitation of this figure is held in very high regard related to feelings of virtue. Thus, legends are simple forms in that they transform a multitude of somewhat related events into a narrative-based myth.

=== Saga ===
Grimm's dictionary is used in inspiring his definition of a saga as a form of folk historical narrative, or folklore. It differs from "real" historical narratives in that they are only "valid" in themselves without any notion of external accountability. For example, Icelandic sagas are primarily orally transmitted, which was thought to inevitably result in errors in transmission, but this was because of a misinterpretation of these literary genres by Andreas Heusler (see The Beginnings of the Icelandic Saga, a 1913 article by Heusler). Sagas differ from other genres in that sagas are first developed within families and in kinship terms, and then are generalized/moved to society-wide consciousness (or national consciousness), taking the example of the family feud characterizing the English Reformation or the Iliad.

=== Myth ===
Rudolf Eisler's Philosophical Dictionary is used alongside Grimm's dictionary in order to develop his notion of myth. However, the two dictionaries conflict with each other significantly. Grimm defines myths as a mere form of saga, whereas Eisler takes a much more German idealist approach to myth. More specifically, Eisler takes it to be man's interpretation and perceived interaction with the natural world and the source of all religion. Jolles adds on to this by saying that is man's innate curiosity and desire to anthropomorphize phenomena that leads to the creation of myths, and gives some examples of (typically natural) phenomena being appraised in a way that creates myths in Greek literature and Greek mythology. And not only is it just natural events that get turned into myths, it is also major historical events, for such events are usually turning points in the group's or cultures's realization of freedom (Geist). Parallels to Greek literature are made again in his statement of freedom-realizing events turning into myths.

=== Riddle ===
Riddles' differences from myths are commonly taught to be from the fact that myths pose answers and explanations to certain phenomenon, whereas riddles pose questions. Jolles adds on to this by giving some examples of (seemingly) unanswerable riddles, for which he inquires as to why a culture/people may develop them. He concludes that it is not the mere solution of the riddle which motivates their development, but rather the process of solving the riddle. This comes from the notion of riddles being a "test" of social equality of knowledge between the person posing the riddle and the person receiving the riddle. As such, there is a notion of the person receiving the riddle obtaining a sense of dignity or worthiness after solving it, which is simply not present in other "simple forms"; it is akin to a literary shibboleth (for which this conjunction of riddled information and an in-group is called an association), and can serve as a limtus test for group membership; they form part the "special language" of the group. In particular, this special language is said to be "encrypted" within the group compared to other forms of literature; they are meant to be unintelligible to non-familiar persons.

=== Proverb ===
Friedrich Seyler’s Deutsche Sprichwörterkunde (Teaching German Proverbs) is used as a basis for Jolles’s further relations on proverbs. It is described as a vernacular piece of literature associated with the spirit of a particular people group, hence the terms "folklore", "folk music", and other terms. Note that in the original German, he uses the word and concept of "volk". However, he takes further attention to individual experiences within people groups as opposed to groups as a whole, and views the development of proverbs within a community via a more empirical lens.

=== Case ===
The word "case" is used to describe miscellaneous candidates of "simple forms" that do not fit the other eight.

=== Memorabile ===
Jolles begins by giving several examples of historical accounts contradicting each other: one is of a police report and newspaper of the same event giving conflicting information of a man's death, and another is that of the killing of William the Silent. He then uses these examples to develop the idea of historical narrative being developed in a more linguistic and literary sense compared to anything strictly related to historiography or the philosophy of history.

=== Fairy Tale ===
They are taught to be a setting in which all our prior notions of morality are satisfied, and can “escape” the “messy” immoralities of the real world.

=== Joke ===
Like riddles, they are intentionally ambiguous, but differ in how and in what way they are ambiguous. More specifically, jokes and humor are encoded in a “double sense”; for example, what is usually expected to be used as an abstraction may actually supposed to be interpreted concretely in a joke.

== Reception and usage ==
Jan Baetens reviewed the book in 2018, commenting on its contrariety compared to current narratology research. This work has also been used in a 2021 dissertation about William Shakespeare and his alleged relationship to folkloric forms, as well as other studies in medieval literature. The 2021 dissertation by Nee was inspired by a lack of literary critics interpreting Shakespeare's work via the lens of folkloric forms. It has also been used in various genre studies articles, especially in the study of legends. Hermeneutic approaches to genre studies/literary theory have been used via this text. In addition, it is a significant precursor to many structuralist and narrativist literary theories. The work has even been interpreted as an early work of the morphology of the mass media.
