= Franz Kafka: The Office Writings =

Book by Franz Kafka

- First edition
- Editor: Stanley Corngold; Jack Greenberg; Benno Wagner
- Author: Franz Kafka
- Translator: Eric Patton; Ruth Hein
- Genre: Essay collection
- Publisher: Princeton University Press
- Publication date: 2008
- ISBN: 978-0-691-12680-7

Franz Kafka: The Office Writings is a 2008 collection of essays, letters and articles composed by Franz Kafka during his years as a high-ranking lawyer with the largest Workmen's Accident Insurance Institute in the Czech lands of the Austro-Hungarian Empire. The collection was edited by Stanley Corngold, Jack Greenberg, and Benno Wagner, and translated by Eric Patton and Ruth Hein. The book includes introductory essays by Corngold and Wagner, as well as commentary following each of Kafka's texts, and an epilogue by Greenberg.

== Contents ==
- The Scope of Compulsory Insurance for the Building trades (1908)
- Speech on the Occasion of the Inauguration of the institute's New Director (1909)
- Fixed-Rate Insurance Premiums for Small Farms Using Machinery (1909)
- Inclusion of Private Automobile "Firms" in the Compulsory Insurance Program (1909)
- Appeal against Risk Classification of Christian Geipel & Sohn, Mechanical Weaving Mill in Asch (1910)
- Measures for Preventing Accidents from Wood-Planing Machines (1910)
- On the Examination of Firms by Trade Inspectors (1911)
- Workmen's Insurance and Employers: Two Articles in the Tetschen Bodenbacher Zeitung (1911)
- Petition of the Toy Producers' Association in Katharinaberg, Erzgebirge (1912)
- Risk Classification Appeal by Norbert Hochsieder, Boarding House Owner in Marienbad (1912)
- Letters to the Workmen's Accident Insurance Institute in Prague (1912–15)
- Criminal Charge against Josef Renelt for the Illegal Withholding of Insurance Fees (1913)
- Second International Congress on Accident Prevention and First Aid in Vienna (1913)
- Accident Prevention in Quarries (1914)
- Jubilee Report: Twenty-Five Years of the Workmen's Accident Insurance Institute (1914)
- Risk Classification and Accident Prevention in Wartime (1915)
- A Public Psychiatric Hospital for German-Bohemia (1916)
- "Help Disabled Veterans! An Urgent Appeal to the Public" (1916/1917)

== Editions ==
- Kafka, Franz. Franz Kafka: The Office Writings. Princeton University Press, 2008. ISBN 978-0-691-12680-7
