= Saverio Tomasella =

French psychoanalyst and researcher

Saverio Tomasella is a French psychoanalyst, researcher and writer, born in Paris in 1966, Doctor in Management (2002), Doctor in Clinical Psychology and Psychopathology (2016).

== Work and research ==
In 2004, he founded the CERP (Centre d’Études et de Recherches en Psychanalyse); in 2016, the Sensitivity Observatory; and in 2019, the World Sensitivity Day (which occurs each 13 January). "In the French-speaking world, Saverio Tomasella popularises the subject [of highly sensitive people] and defends the terms ‘high sensitivity’ and ‘ultrasensitivity’. He calls for a ‘sensitivity revolution’ that would promote all forms of empathy and human sensitivity."

== Publications ==
Saverio Tomasella is the author of numerous articles, books on psychology and novels, most of which have been translated in other languages. His research focuses on trauma, sensitivity and Highly Sensitive Persons, friendship and human relationships.

=== Research articles ===
- "Statut politique et sujet singulier : Le subjectif de l’apatrié", L'Homme et la société n° 212(1):295-320, July 2021. (DOI:10.3917/lhs.212.0295)
- "L’ être humain est l’enjeu fondamental de toute démarche sémiotique", Estudos Semióticos 16(1):30-42, July 2020. (DOI:10.11606/issn.1980-4016.esse.2020.172064)
- "L’étrangéisation ou le hors-sujet de la catastrophe", Le Coq-héron, 2018/2, n° 233, p. 76-85. (DOI 10.3917/cohe.233.0076)
- "Resubjectivations après une catastrophe ou la subjectivité dévastée", Psychologie Clinique, 2017/1, n° 43, p. 123-133. (DOI 10.1051/psyc/201743123)
- "Desubjectivation, Resubjectivation and Collective Resilience in Disasters Situation: The Exile of European and Jewish Populations of the Maghreb. A commentary.", Trauma & Acute Care, vol. 2, n° 1:34, 2017.
- "L’objet b ou le besoin comme nécessité", Psychotropes, vol. 22, N. 1, 2016, p. 31–48.
- "Trauma, deuil et principe d’intégrité", L'Évolution psychiatrique, vol. 81, N. 3, mai 2015, p. 641–652 (DOI 10.1016/j.evopsy.2015.05.004)
- "Je l’ai tellement dans la peau que j’en deviens marteau", Psychotropes, vol. 20, N. 1, 2014, p. 135–151 (DOI 10.3917/psyt.201.0135)
- "Les marques", Virtuel, Adolescences, N. 47, 22 (1), Paris, mars 2004, p. 59–66.
- "Le psychanalyste, le groupe et l'inconscient : quelle place pour être sujet ?", Autour du psychodrame, Le Coq-Héron, N. 217, Toulouse, juin 2014, p. 122–126.
- "Le trauma et ses répercussions somato-psychiques ou la pensée interrompue", Avec Ferenczi à Budapest, Le Coq-Héron, N. 212, Toulouse, mars 2013, p. 85–95.
- "Conscience et fragilité", Sous le sceau du corps, Le Coq-Héron, N. 203, Toulouse, décembre 2010, p. 97–107.
- "Haine, envie, jalousie : psychanalyse du désastre", Erich Fromm : un psychanalyste hors norme, Le Coq-Héron, N. 182, Toulouse, octobre 2005.
- "Extension ou extinction des feux : de l'essaim au courrant d'affects", Entre pratique et théorie, Le Coq-Héron, N. 176, Toulouse, mars 2004.
- "L’homéo-érotisme ou quête affective du même", Le Coq-Héron, Toulouse, mars 2001.
- "L'inconscient, un ailleurs pour l'entreprise", Un certain autre regard, N. 2, IPM, 2013, p. 117–120.
- De pouvoirs en capacités, Hermétisme, Paris, mars 2006.
- "Attendre, tendre : la patience, accueil de l’étrange", Epistolettre, N. 26, Paris, Fédération des ateliers de psychanalyse, 2004.
- "Silence ou mutisme", Epistolettre, N. 20, Paris, FAP, 1999.
- "L'école buissonnière", "Un chemin", "La frayeur de l'enfant trop sage", Epistolettre, N. 19, Paris, FAP, 1998.
- "Hamlet ou le féminin retrouvé", Les années paradoxes, Paris, Experts, décembre 1999, p. 74–77.
