= André Jolles =

Dutch-German art historian, literary critic and linguist

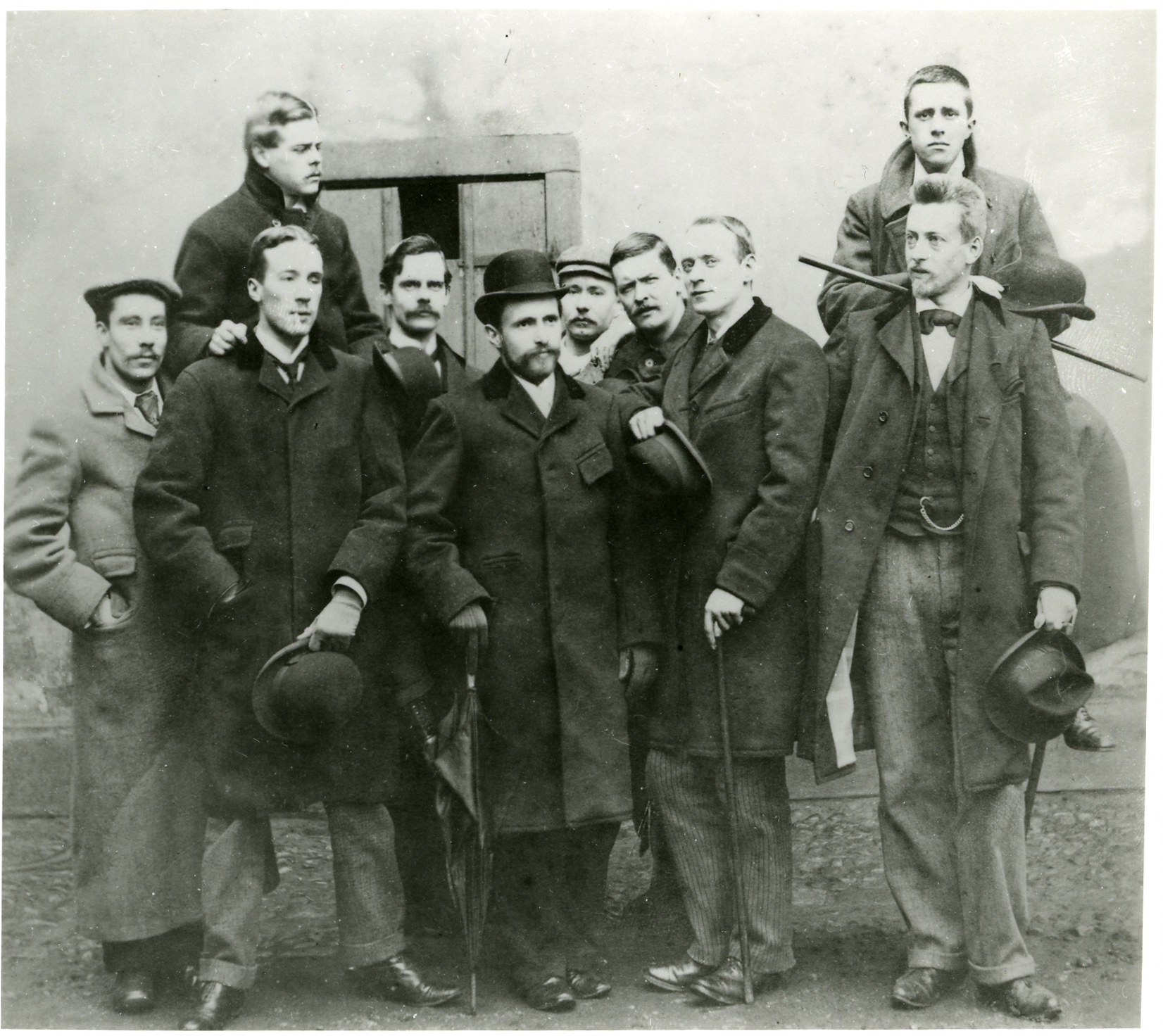
Far right André Jolles - behind him Johan Huizinga (about 1900)

Johannes Andreas Jolles, known as André Jolles (August 7, 1874 – February 22, 1946) was a Dutch-German art historian, literary critic and linguist who was affiliated with the Nazi Party. He is best known for his book Simple Forms.

== Life ==
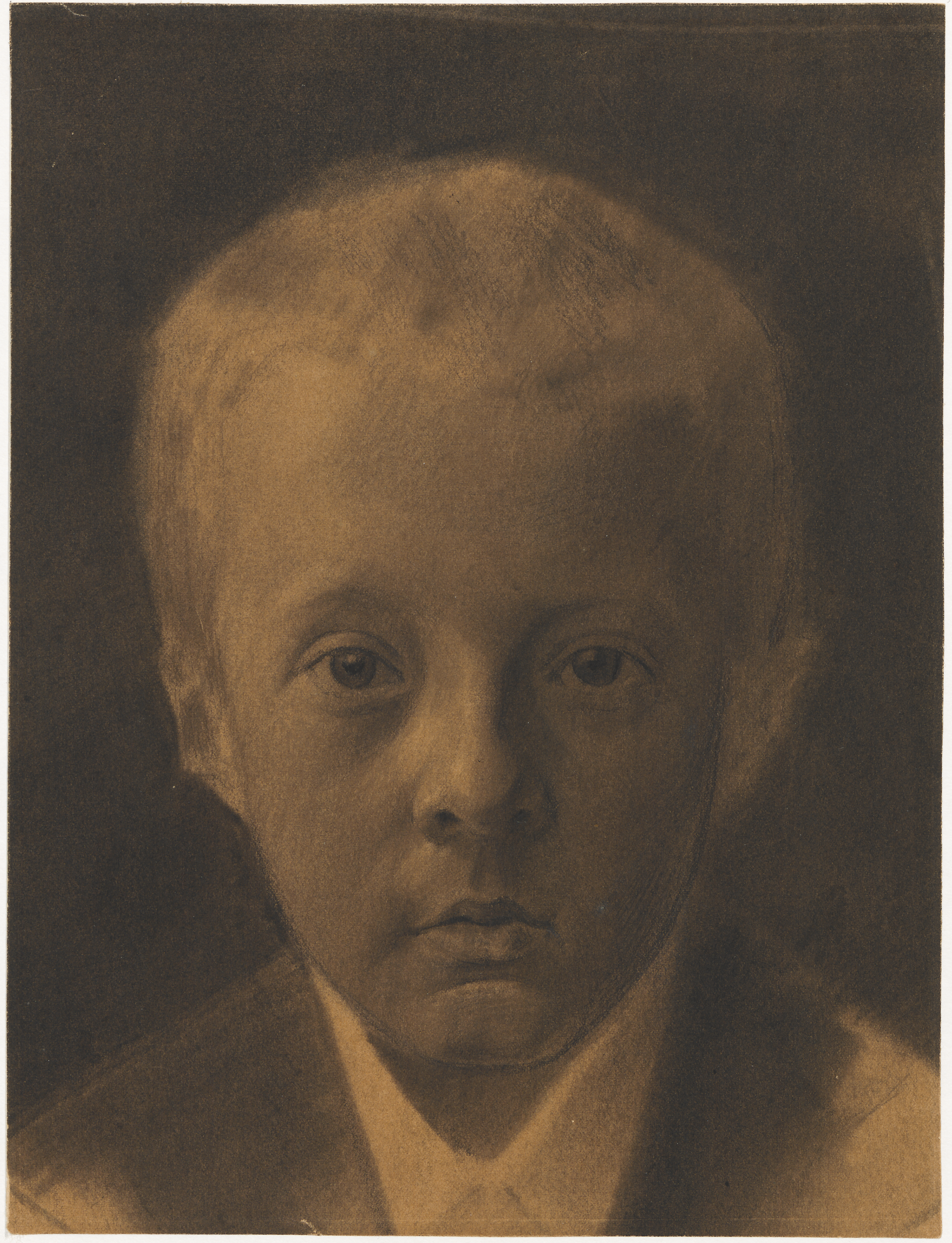
Youth portrait of Jolles by Jan Veth

Jolles was born on August 7, 1874, in Den Helder, Netherlands. His father, Hendrik Jolle Jolles, died on February 25, 1888, in Naples. Jolles grew up as an only child with his mother Jacoba Cornelia Singles (1847–1901) in Amsterdam, where he attended the Barlaeus Gymnasium.

In the 1890s, he worked on magazines such as Van Nu en Straks and De Kroniek in 1893 and 1895 respectively, and was the editor for art and science at De Telegraaf from 1897 to 1898. He studied Egyptian and Semitic languages in Paris and Amsterdam from 1893 to 1894 and again in 1899 at the University of Leiden.

In 1896, Jolles met Johan Huizinga in Groningen, who became a long-time friend. On a trip to Italy with Huizinga in 1899, he met his future wife Mathilde Tilli Mönckeberg (1879–1958). They married in September 1900. Their first son, Hendrik, was born in June 1901 but died a year later. After that, they had five children: Jeltje, Jacoba, Jan Andries, Matthijs and Ruth.

Jolles, who became wealthy after his mother's death in 1901, began studying at the University of Freiburg im Breisgau, where he received his doctorate on August 3, 1905, with a thesis on Vitruvian aesthetics with Otto Puchstein. He gave his habilitation lecture, "On the narrative and the descriptive element in the fine arts in antiquity and the Middle Ages" in Freiburg (January 1907), and his habilitation thesis, The Egyptian-Mycenaean Ceremonial Vessels, appeared in 1908. Additionally, he co-wrote the pieces Vielliebchen and Alkestis with Carl Mönckeberg, both of which were staged in Hamburg.

His family moved to Berlin in 1908, where he taught from 1909 as a private lecturer on ancient art history at Friedrich-Wilhelm University.

When World War I began, he registered as a 40-year-old and became a Dutch volunteer. An artillery regiment accepted him after several rejections. Jolles was naturalised and initially participated in the First World War as a soldier and finally as a lieutenant in the Landwehr. In 1916, as an officer in the occupying forces, he accepted a professorship in classical archaeology and art history at the University of Ghent. In 1920, he was sentenced in absentia to 15 years of forced labour in Ghent. While in Ghent, he lived with Margarethe Grittli Boecklen (1895–1967). After he divorced Mönckeberg, he married Boecklen in August 1918, shortly after the birth of their first child Barbara.

Jolles became a professor in Flemish and Dutch language and literature at Leipzig University. In 1923 he also became the professor of comparative history of literature.

Letter by Jolles to Huizinga (1929), a.o. about Einfache Formen

In 1930, he published his main work Simple Forms (Einfache Formen), in which he set out a typology of oral narrative forms (myth, legend, fairy tale, memorable, case, riddle, saying, joke). As stated in the preface, the book originated from Jolles' lectures, which Drs. Elisabeth Kutzer and Otto Görner wrote down and edited. Jolles' further considerations about the art forms were not substantial enough to be published.

Simple Forms place Jolles in the company of Ernst Cassirer, Vladimir Propp, and other precursors of Structuralism. Using anthropology and literary theory, they investigated the origins of aesthetics. The book was translated into English only in 2017, "too late", in the words of Fredric Jameson.

On May 1, 1933, he joined the Nazi Party, estranging several friends and his children from his first marriage: Jeltje was married to a Jewish engineer, and Jan Andries was forced to go into exile as a communist to South America under a Spanish Passport with the alias ‘Manuel Enrique Cazón Arribar’. In 1937, Jolles joined the Sicherheitsdienst (SD) – the intelligence agency of the Nazi Party and the SS. He retired in 1941, and from 1942 worked on a study on behalf of the SD on Freemasonry. On his 70th birthday, he received the Goethe Medal for Art and Science from Hitler in 1944.

On a questionnaire he filled out in May 1945 about his Nazi past, it is noted in handwriting: "is still a Nazi – too old (71 years) to be arrested". André Jolles committed suicide on February 22, 1946, in Leipzig, Germany.

== Publications (selection) ==
- Vitruvian aesthetics. Diss. Freiburg i. Br., 1906 ( full text )
- The Egyptian-Mycenaean ceremonial vessels. Habilitation thesis (Freiburg i. Br.). In: Yearbook of the Imperial German Archaeological Institute. Volume 23, 1908, pp. 209–250.
- From Schiller to the community stage. Leipzig 1919.
- Bezieling en Vorm. Essays about letterkunde. Tjeenk Willink, Haarlem 1923. (Dutch)
- Simple shapes. Legend, legend, myth, riddle, saying, case, memorabilia, fairy tale, joke. Halle (Saale) 1930 (Research Institute for Modern Philology Leipzig: New German Department; 2) Online; Reprint Darmstadt 1958.
- Freemasonry. Essence and customs. First book: The emergence of Freemasonry. Nordland-Verlag, Berlin. (not published) - Sources and representations on the Masonic question; 5.

== Literature ==
- Hermann Bausinger: Jolles, André. In: Encyclopedia of Fairy Tales Vol. 7, 1993, pp. 623–625.
- Hellmut Rosenfeld: Jolles, André. In: New German Biography (NDB). Volume 10, Duncker & Humblot, Berlin 1974, ISBN 3-428-00191-5 , p. 586 f. (Digitzed).
- Walter Thys (ed.): André Jolles (1874-1946), "Educated Vagant". Amsterdam / Leipzig 2000, ISBN 3-934565-11-5. (Partly German, partly Dutch.)
- Mathilde Wolff-Mönckeberg: Letters they didn't get. Letters from a mother to her distant children between 1940 and 1946. Hoffmann et al. Campe, Hamburg 1980, ISBN 3-455-08605-5. (First published as the English translation: On the Other Side. To My Children: From Germany 1940-1945. Owen, London 1979, ISBN 0-7206-0528-8 .)
- Literature by and about Johannes Andreas Jolles in the catalog of the German National Library
- Johannes Andreas Jolles in the professor catalog of the University of Leipzig.
- Brigitte Emmrich: Jolles, André (a.k.a. Johannes Andreas, pseudonym: Karl Andres). In: Institute for Saxon History and Folklore (Ed.): Saxon Biography.
