= Mária Török =

Hungarian-born French psychoanalyst

Maria Torok (Hungarian: Török Mária [ˈtørøk ˈmaːrijɒ]; 10 November 1925, Budapest – 25 March 1998, New York City) was a Hungarian-born French psychoanalyst.

Torok is best known for her idiosyncratic contributions to psychoanalytic theory, developed in the wake of first Freud, then Ferenczi, and also the critical study of Husserl, and often coauthored with Nicolas Abraham. With Abraham, Maria Torok has made significant advances in the study of the problem of pathological mourning and transgenerational influences.

== Life and career ==
Maria Torok fled from Hungary in 1947 and came to live in Paris. She then trained as a psychologist at the Sorbonne in the 1950s, before meeting Nicolas Abraham and deciding to go into analysis. 'Torok went on to become an analyst and a member of the Paris psychoanalytical society'.

After Abraham's death in 1975, she continued their joint line of work in co-operation with Abraham's nephew, Nicolas Rand, until her death in New York in 1998.

== Writings ==
=== The illness of mourning ===
In her 1968 article "The Illness of Mourning and the Fantasy of the Exquisite Corpse," Torok reexamined the problems of introjection and incorporation, as presented from the works of Sándor Ferenczi through those of Melanie Klein. She distinguished introjection, as a process that allows the ego to be enriched with the instinctual traits of the pleasure-object, from incorporation, a fantasmatic mechanism that positions the forbidden or prohibited object within'. Torok argued that in 'impossible or refused mourning...faced with the impotence of the process of introjection (gradual, slow, laborious, mediated, effective), incorporation is the only choice: fantasmic, unmediated, instantaneous, magical, sometimes hallucinatory'.

Torok explored how in 'erotic mourning rituals...the outline of a sentimental sickness emerges' — something made 'manifest in the erotically charged "fantasmes du cadavres exquis" ["the fantasm of the exquisite cadaver"] through which [men] conflate women and sepulchral desire'. She highlighted how mourners 'fixate on objects as representations both of loss and sepulchral desire', impelled by '"the feeling of an irreparable sin: the sin of having been caught at the moment of libidinal overflow at the least appropriate moment, the moment for grief and abandonment to despair"'.

The result was mourning become illness, or the impossible grieving for a loved one, fuelled by the fantasy of incorporation or secret identification with a lost object of love: a form of 'magic to recover the lost object of pleasure and to compensate for the missing introjection. The inclusion serves to deny the loss, when it is unspeakable'.

=== The crypt and the phantom ===
Torok developed her ideas with the concepts of the crypt and the phantom within. 'The phenomenon of the phantom results not from the return of the repressed, but from the cryptic inclusion of an Other, in the face of which the illness of mourning and the work of mourning have not been able to take effect'. The transgenerational phantom or "work of the ghost in the unconscious" means the effects of family secrets passed down through generations: 'the "phantom" is a formation in the dynamic unconscious that is found there not because of the subject's own repression but on account of a direct empathy with the unconscious or the repressed psychic matter of a parental object'...not at all the product of the subject'.

Within the ego, the crypt represents the burial of an unspeakable lived shame: 'When one can not recognize one's grief, trauma and all the emotions that it provokes find themselves led away into a vault. The crypt is the result of a shameful secret shared' — shared with the lost object of love. 'Crypts are only constructed when the shameful secret is the love object's doing and when that object also functions for the subject as an ego ideal'.

Such preservative repression takes effect by way of a splitting of the ego, producing a 'distinction between "constitutive [ie dynamic] repression" apparent in hysterics, and the "preservative repression" specific to cryptophores'.

The result is to produce ghost-like secrets in the family, unspoken, but indicated by so-called cryptic behaviour, by non-verbal para-speech, and sometimes by being incorporated materially into household objects.

=== Trauma ===
Her works, both alone and with Abraham, made a renewed place for the idea of trauma in psychoanalytic thinking and practice, and developed the idea of cryptonymy — suggesting that anagrams, homophones, rhymes, puns and other word and sound plays expressed certain patients' unconscious desires, circumventing the mind's linguistic censorship.

=== Psychoanalytic theory ===
After the 1978 publication of her collected clinical essays, Torok 'has outlined a new field of historical and theoretical research concerned with the psychogenesis of Freudian psychoanalysis' — work culminating in 2000 with the posthumous Questions for Freud.

'If Freud's theories form the protective shell around his intuition, simultaneously concealing and revealing it, what of the actual kernel? For it is the kernel which, invisible but active, confers its meaning upon the whole construction. This kernel, the active principle of psychoanalytic theory, will not show through unless all the apparent contradictions have found their explanation'. In accordance with Torok's continuing championship of Ferenczi viz-a-viz Freud, she considered that in fact 'Freud carries a crypt within him...a metapsychological phantom '.

=== Overview ===
Maria Torok was committed to the idea of a psychoanalysis with a human face. Taking her bearings from the creative ground-breaking work of Freud, without necessarily condoning his errors or justifying his impasses, her priority was always clinical: acceptance of the human being, in all the human strivings and suffering. Long overshadowed by exaggerated media coverage of the Lacan phenomenon, the thought of Maria Torok is slowly gaining ground throughout Europe. The advances of Mária Török have been taken up and continued in France by many psychoanalysts — among them Judith Dupont, Pascal Hachet, Lucien Melese, Claude Nachin, Jean-Claude Rouchy, Barbro Sylwan, Saverio Tomasella, and Serge Tisseron. Her works in English translation include The Wolf Man's Magic Word: A Cryptonymy and The Shell and the Kernel: Renewals of Psychoanalysis.

'The conception of psychoanalysis of Nicolas Abraham and Maria Torok extends to the whole lifespan the possibility of psychic fixations, something which reduces the relative importance of the conflicts and instinctual repressions of childhood, while increasing that of traumatic experiences, individual and collective, which may occur at any age'.
