= O. J. Matthijs Jolles =

Otto Jolle Matthijs Jolles (1911–1968) wrote the first American translation of Carl von Clausewitz's magnum opus, On War. Jolles himself is a bit obscure to students of military affairs, largely because his translation of On War was his only published effort in that field. Even his nationality has been misidentified—he has been variously identified as Hungarian, Czech, and Dutch. Military historian Jay Luvaas once quoted an unidentified Israeli professor as saying "whereas the first English translation was by an Englishman who did not know German, the 1943 American translation was by a Hungarian who did not know English." In the field of German literature, Jolles is quite well known, especially for his work on Friedrich Schiller. Most of his published work, however, is in German.

== Life ==
Born in Berlin of a Dutch father, André Jolles, and German mother, Jolles was brought up as a German and educated at the Universities of Leipzig, Hamburg, and Heidelberg. He received his doctorate in the philosophy of literature from Heidelberg in 1933. He then served one year as a volunteer in the horse artillery. Although he was not Jewish, his anti-Nazi politics brought him into conflict with the regime. In 1934 he emigrated to France, where he studied at the Sorbonne. The following year he emigrated to Wales, where he taught German. Offered a teaching position at the University of Chicago, he entered the United States with his new British wife in 1938. He became a professor of German language and literature, obtaining American citizenship in 1945. Leaving Chicago in 1962, he spent the remainder of his life at Cornell.

== University of Chicago ==
Even before the United States entered the war, the University of Chicago had begun seeking ways to assist the war effort. These efforts grew out of both patriotism and self-interest: the university's leaders were concerned that unless they established Chicago as a center of military learning and research, the university's considerable assets (particularly in cartography and linguistics) might be hauled off in army trucks, "to be returned torn and soiled, if at all." (31) Courses in preinduction military training began as early as September 1940. A formal Institute of Military Studies was created in April 1941. Since Jolles taught military German and German military organization, and On War was considered to be a key to German military behavior, he seemed to be the natural man for the job even though he was not familiar with Clausewitz when he set out. His British father-in-law (a retired professor of classics) provided assistance with the English, although he too had little military background and was new to Clausewitz.

== Translation ==
Jolles quickly developed a good appreciation of On War's significance. His purpose in translating it was to argue that what Clausewitz had to say was much more relevant to the Western Allies than to Germany, and that the Germans' one-sidedly offensive interpretation of On War would prove to be, for them, a fatal error. Jolles's short introduction stressed Clausewitz's fundamentally conservative, balance-of-power view of international affairs, finding its most important expression in Clausewitz's argument concerning the power of the defense: Clausewitz's aim was not merely to prove the strategic superiority of Napoleon's lightning attacks as so many writers and strategists--British and American, unfortunately, as well as German--seem to believe. This is but one part of his theory and far from the most important one, for he goes on to show why Napoleon, greatest of all aggressors up to that time, was necessarily in the end completely defeated. More than one third of his work On War is devoted to Book VI, on "Defense."

== Reception ==
Jolles's translation of Clausewitz is generally considered to convey more of Clausewitz's subtleties than the older Graham translation did and to be clearer on some points than the overrated Howard/Paret translation (1976/84). However, Jolles's translation did not catch on, and the Graham translation continued to serve as the basis for most subsequent condensations. This development was most likely a result of financial considerations rather than of the qualities of the respective versions, since the Jolles translation remains under copyright whereas the Graham copyright had lapsed.
