= Hugo Salazar Tamariz =

Ecuadorian poet, novelist, playwright

- Born: September 2, 1923; Cuenca, Ecuador
- Died: January 31, 1999 (aged 75); Guayaquil, Ecuador
- Occupations: Poet, novelist, playwright
- Writing career
- Genre: Socialist realism

Hugo Salazar Tamariz (Cuenca, September 2, 1923 – Guayaquil, January 31, 1999) was an Ecuador poet, novelist and playwright. His writing is marked by socialist realism.

== Works ==
- Otra historia del mismo Lobo (1964), novel
- The Indian in the Novels of Ciro Alegría (1965) essay
- Los constructores del amanecer: novela (1995), novel
- El mago, agitador profesional: novela (2002), novel
- Transparencia en el trébol (1948)
- Diálogo con una gente intransigente (1988)
- El habitante amenazado: (poema contra el pacto militar) (1955)
- La llaga (1962), play
- La falsa muerte de un ciclista (1968), play
- En tiempos de la colonia (1979), play
- Toque de queda, play
- Por un plato de arroz, play
- El habitante amenzado (1973), play
- Sinfonía de los antepasados (1960)
- Pirañas (1996)
- Teatro (1986)
- Otra historia del mismo lobo (1960)
