= Philip von Saltza =

American artist (1885–1980)

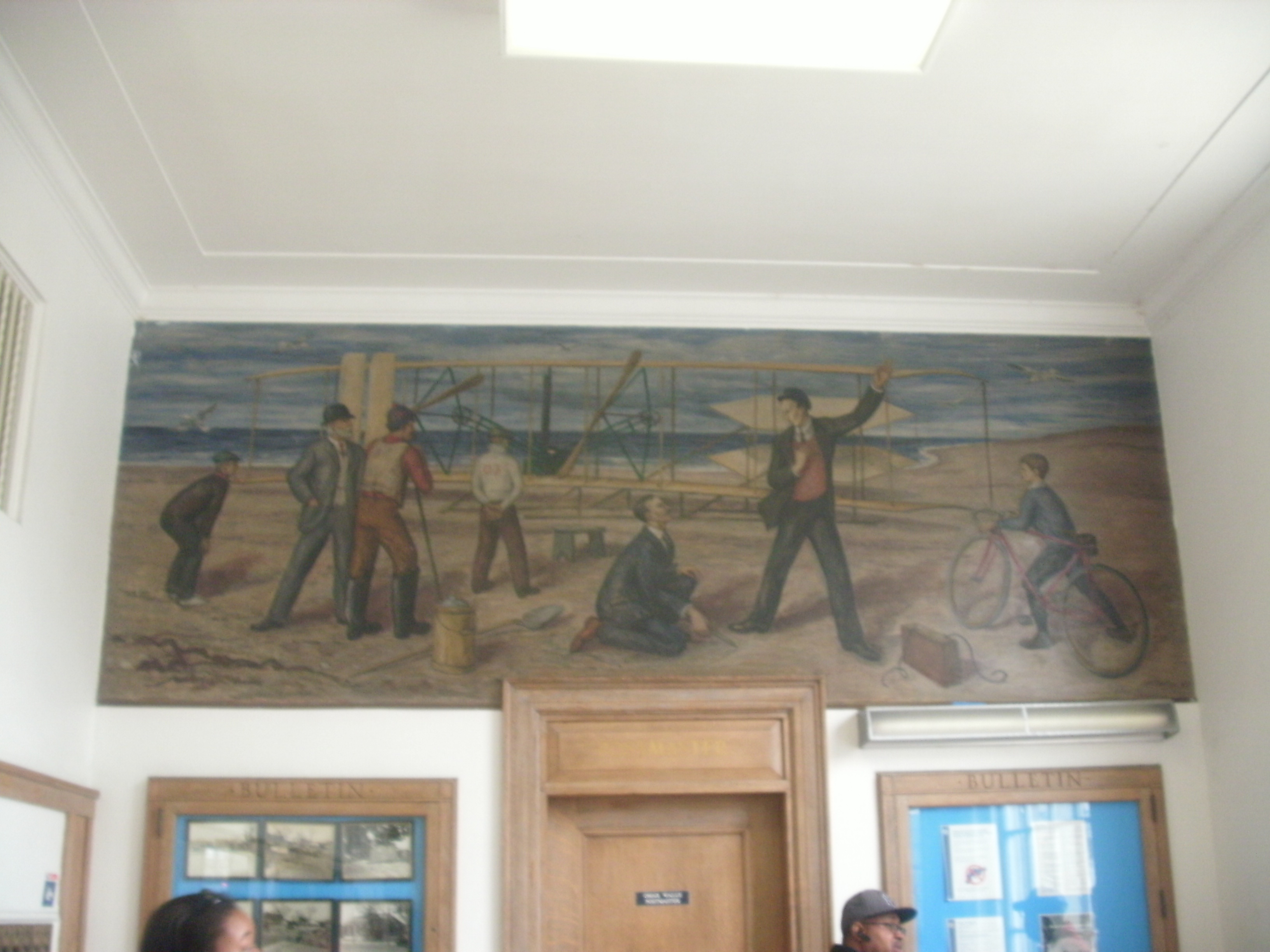
First Flight of the Wright Brothers at Kitty Hawk, located at the post office in Williamston, North Carolina

Philip Wenceslaus von Saltza (March 3, 1885 – January 21, 1980) was a Swedish-born American artist and muralist.

== Early life ==
Philip was born in Stockholm, Sweden, into the Saltza family, Swedish noble family of German origin. He immigrated to the United States with his parents, Carl Frederick von Saltza (1858–1905) and his wife, Wilhelmina Stoopendaal (1863–1905) during 1891. His father was a portrait painter and professor at Columbia University in New York City. At the age of 14, Philip von Saltza was enrolled in the Horace Mann School in New York and entered Columbia University in 1904, where he played varsity football until it was abolished. He also captained the eight-man crew rowing team. He graduated in 1909 with a degree in mining engineering.

== Career ==
After his graduation, he pursued his career as an engineer at mines in Oregon and Colorado . During the First World War, von Saltza served in the 306th Field Artillery, and was captured by German forces during the Battle of Argonne Forest in September 1918; he remained a prisoner of war until the end of the war. After the war ended, von Saltza emerged as a professional painter.

== Post office murals ==
During the Great Depression, he painted several United States Post Office murals. Art critic Jay McHale described them as "being like Gershwin tunes". These are located in: Saint Albans, Vermont (Haying and Sugaring Off); Milford, New Hampshire (Lumberman Log-Rolling); Schuyler, Nebraska (Wild Horses by Moonlight); and Williamston, North Carolina (First Flight of the Wright Brothers at Kitty Hawk). He corresponded with one of the Wright Brothers while working on the latter. In 1939, he exhibited at the New York World's Fair. A selection of his photographs are located at the Archives of American Art in Washington, D.C.

== Personal life ==
In 1910, he married Katharine Warren Hardenbergh. They were divorced in 1922. In 1925, he married Bertha Jane Miller. He was the father of five children.
