= Carl Frederick von Saltza =

Swedish-American artist

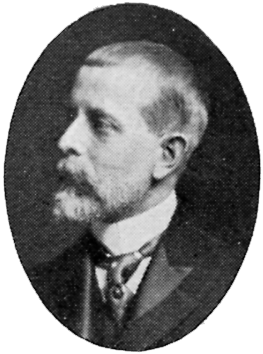
Carl Fredrik von Saltza

Carl Frederick von Saltza (born Carl Fredrik von Saltza; 29 October 1858 – 10 December 1905) was a Swedish-American artist and portrait painter. Saltza was best known in Sweden for his genre pictures in watercolor and for his drawings. He was one of the main illustrators for the 1893 edition of the Poetic Edda by Fredrik Sander (1828–1900). In the United States, Von Saltza was best known for his portraits.

== Life ==
Born in i858, the parish of Sörby in Östergötland, Sweden, into the von Saltza noble family of German origin, Carl Frederik was the son of Count Carl Anton Philips von Saltza and his wife, Countess Gustava Christina De la Gardie. Saltza received his early education in private schools in Uppsala and Stockholm, Sweden, and subsequently went on to study painting in the Royal Academy in Stockholm where he studied under Edvard Perséus. There he studied under Georg von Rosen and August Malmström. Dissatisfied with the teaching, Saltza traveled abroad with his friend Karl Nordström and continued his studies at the Royal Academy in Brussels, Belgium, and under private teachers in Paris, France, including Jean-Léon Gérôme.

Upon his return to Sweden, he associated himself with the group of artists who formed an artists' association known as Konstnärsförbundet in 1886. The conflict between the Royal Swedish Academy of Arts and Konstnärsförbundet contributed to von Saltza's decision to emigrate to the United States in 1891. Saltza was an instructor in painting in St. Louis, Missouri from 1892 to 1898, and later at the Chicago Art Institute in from 1898 to 1899. From 1899 to 1901, he was an instructor at the Teachers' College at Columbia University in Manhattan, New York City. Later in life, von Saltza painted portraits in Cleveland, Ohio. He died in St. Luke's Hospital in New York City in 1905. Saltza married Henrietta Stoopendahl (1863–1905) in 1883 in Stockholm. They were the parents of artist Philip W. von Saltza. His daughter, Elisabeth Christina von Saltza married Columbia professor George Philip Krapp.

== Gallery ==
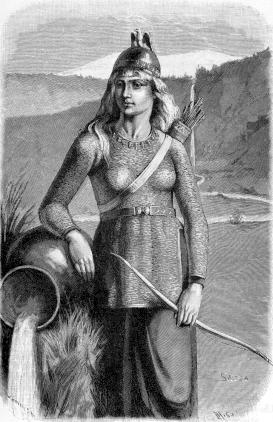
Skaði

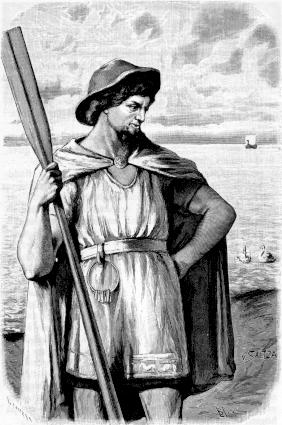
Njörðr

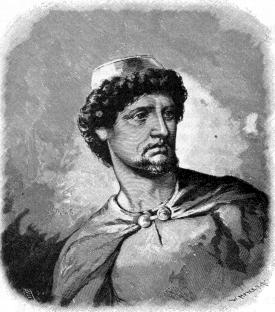
Loki

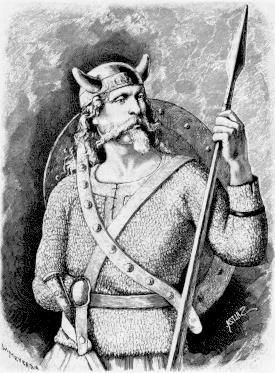
Týr

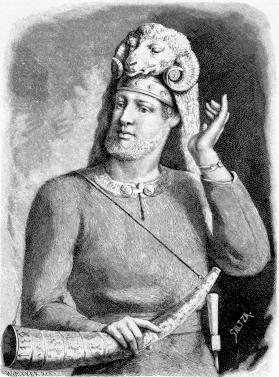
Heimdallr

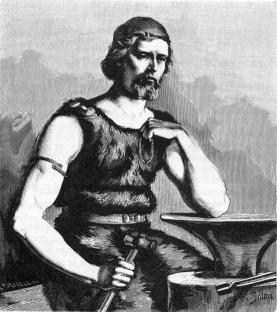
Völundr

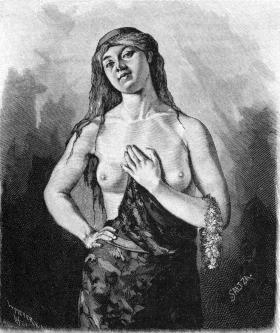
A giantess

== Other sources ==
- American Federation of Arts (1908). American Art Directory. R.R. Bowker.
- Hamersly, Lewis Randolph (Editor) (1905). Who's who in New York City and State. L.R. Hamersly Co.
- Johansson, Ulla (2000–2002). "von Saltza" in Svenskt biografiskt lexikon vol. 31, pp. 316–319. Stockholm.
- Söderberg, Rolf (1949). "Saltza, Carl Fredrik von" in Svenska män och kvinnor, vol. 6, pp. 482–483. Stockholm.
