= Alfredo Vera Vera =

Ecuadorian politician

Alfredo Vera Vera (1910–1999) was an Ecuadorian politician.
