= Nicolas Abraham =

Hungarian-born French

- Born: Ábrahám Miklós; 23 May 1919; Kecskemét, Hungary
- Died: 18 December 1975 (aged 56); Paris, France
- Education: University of Paris
- Known for: his work with Maria Torok
- Scientific career
- Fields: Psychoanalytic theory

Nicolas Abraham (French: [abʁa.am]; Hungarian: Ábrahám Miklós [ˈaːbrɒhaːm ˈmikloːʃ]; 23 May 1919 – 18 December 1975) was a Hungarian-born French psychoanalyst best known for his work with Mária Török. The pair took a distinctive approach to psychoanalytic theory, holding that the use of preset notions (castration, desire for the mother, etc.) may restrict an individual's motives in relation to the framework of their personal experiences.

== Life ==
Abraham was born in Kecskemét and moved to Paris in 1938. He studied philosophy, being influenced by Husserl. He was analysed by Béla Grunberger.

== Work ==
=== Phantom and crypt ===
Abraham (along with Mária Török) worked within the Freudian paradigm, but as fleshed out by the findings of Sándor Ferenczi; and indeed extended both—as with his concept of 'a parasitic inclusion', an extension of 'introjection, as defined by Ferenczi'. Together with Török 'he introduced several key concepts of contemporary psychoanalysis: the family secret, transmitted from one generation to the next (theory of the phantom), the impossibility of mourning following the emergence of shameful libidinal impulses in the bereaved before or after the death of someone (mourning disorder), secret identification with another (incorporation), the burial of an inadmissible experience (crypt)'.

Especially noteworthy has been 'the work of Nicolas Abraham and Mária Török on the intergenerational transmission of the phantom' created by trauma. 'Abraham and Török use the word "nescience" to describe the phantom effect. It refers to the gap in knowledge where the trauma resides'. Arguably at least 'the "phantom" represents a radical reorientation of Freudian and post-Freudian theories of psychopathology, since here symptoms do not spring from the individual's own life experiences but from someone else's psychic conflicts, traumas, or secrets'.

Equally influential has been their concept of the "crypt". 'According to the theories of Abraham and Török, the construction of a crypt takes place when a loss, a "segment of an ever so significantly lived Reality—untellable and therefore inaccessible to the gradual assimilative work of mourning"—cannot be admitted as a loss'. The crypt is thus 'a place in the inside of the subject, in which the lost object is "swallowed and preserved".

The two ideas are interwoven in 'their concept of "cryptonomy", a reconfiguration of the Freudian unconscious as a psychic "crypt", a kind of tomb or vault harboring the not fully confronted "phantoms" (fantomes) or secrets from the analysand's earlier history'. The crypt thus formed part of an ever-deepening set of defence mechanisms: 'Beneath the fetish, the occult love for a word-object remains concealed, beneath this love, the taboo-forming memory of a catastrophe, and finally beneath the catastrophe, the perennial memory of a hoarded pleasure'.

As Derrida insists, however, while 'ghost effects and crypt effects (of incorporation) were discovered nearly simultaneously, in the same problematic space' nonetheless 'their strict difference' as concepts must be acknowledged.

=== Other contributions ===
Among other topics discussed by Abraham, we find:

1. 'The shell-and-the-kernel...the theory of nuclearity'.

2. From his philosophical heritage came Abraham's use of transphenomenology and anasemia: 'We will encounter this transphenomenological motif again, which, along with the anasemic rule, has long oriented this research'. Referring to specific psychoanalytic conceptualization, one might say that '"Anasemia" is thus a process of problematizing the meaning of signs in an undetermined way'.

3. 'In his essay On Symbol, Nicholas Abraham outlines a theory of disaster or obstacle whose initial premise is the danger of disintegration'; defence against the danger may be found in 'a manipulation of verbal entities...called variously crypt, cryptonymy, or the broken symbol '.

== Legacy ==
It has been suggested that 'between 1959 and 1975 Abraham's work contributed to the renewal of psychoanalytic theory and practice...[as] his discoveries flesh out Freud's theories and help expand the limits of analysis....In France, Abraham's work constituted a third way between orthodox Freudianism and Lacanianism. Overcoming various forms of resistance, it has achieved worldwide recognition'.

There is a prize, administered by the European Association Nicolas Abraham and Maria Torok and named after the pair, awarded every two years to a work (book, thesis, or article) produced in French during previous two years. The award is intended to underline the interest that the Association maintains for research work in continuance of any of the many pathways opened up by the work of Nicolas Abraham and Maria Torok. The theoretical qualities and clinical value of the work presented are taken into consideration, but so too is their innovative character.

== Works ==
=== With Maria Torok ===
- The Shell and the Kernel: Renewals of Psychoanalysis. Trans. Nicholas Rand. ISBN 0-226-00088-5.
- The Wolf Man's Magic Word: A Cryptonymy. ISBN 0-8166-4858-1.
