= Situs orbis terre vel regionum =

Anonymous Latin geographical treatise

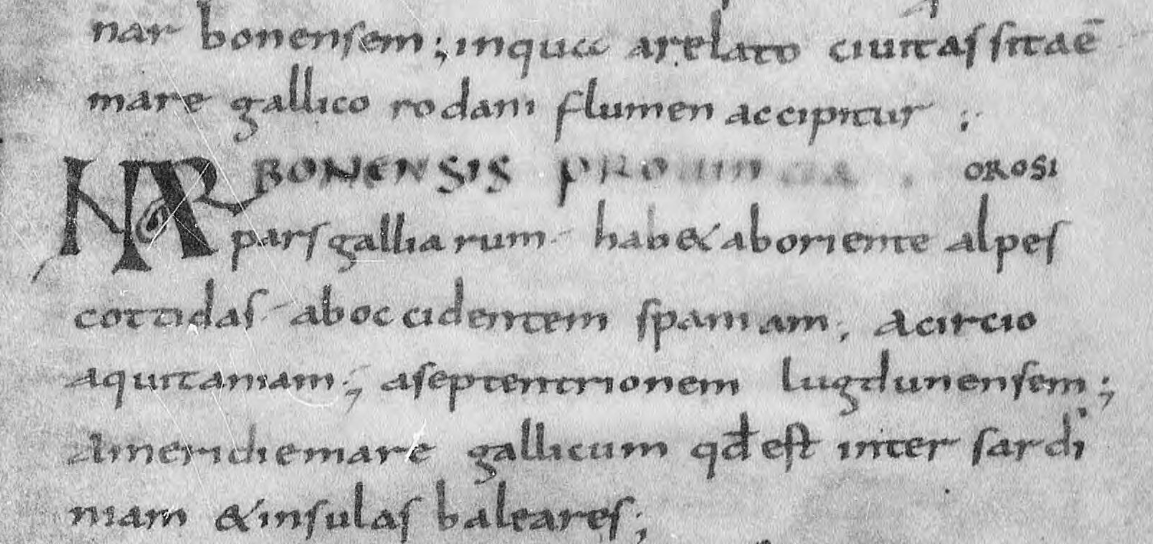
The unusual three-letter initial from the section on Narbonensis is one indication that the manuscript was copied in Septimania

Situs orbis terre vel regionum is an anonymous Latin geographical treatise written sometime between the late 7th and early 9th centuries. It was composed either in Septimania or the Iberian Peninsula, both part of the Visigothic Kingdom down to 711. It is known from a single manuscript, now in Paris, Bibliothèque nationale de France, MS lat. 4841, where it occupies the first thirteen folios. Certain features of the manuscript indicate that it was copied in Septimania in the Carolingian Empire around 842.

The Situs was probably a schoolroom text, intended for an elementary level of instruction. Several corrections and glosses in the margins of the manuscript indicate that the text did see use as intended, although only one copy survives. Structurally, the work follows the outline of Isidore of Seville's Etymologiae, books XIII–XIV. It borrows his etymologies of names, but fills out its account with material taken from Orosius' History Against the Pagans. It has a prologue (Praefatio) and ten chapters:

1. De oceano (on the ocean)
2. De Mediterraneum mare (on the Mediterranean sea)
3. De sinibus maris (on the bays of the sea)
4. De lacis et stagnis (on lakes)
5. Situs orbis siue regionum (location of regions)
6. Asia
7. Europa
8. Africa
9. Insulae (islands)
10. [untitled chapter on other parts of Asia]

== Bibliography ==
- Gautier-Dalché, Patrick (1985). "Situs orbis terre vel regionum: Un traite de geographie inedit du haut Moyen Age (Paris, B.N. latin 4841)". Revue d'histoire des textes (12–13): 149–179.
- González Marrero, José Antonio (2016). "El espacio atlántico en el siglo IX a través del anónimo Sitvs orbis terre vel regionvm" (PDF). Anuario de Estudios Atlánticos (62): 1–10.
- Lozovsky, Natalia (1996). "Carolingian Geographical Tradition: Was It Geography?". Early Medieval Europe. 5 (1): 25–43.
- Lozovsky, Natalia (2000). The Earth Is Our Book: Geographical Knowledge in the Latin West, ca. 400–1000. University of Michigan Press.
