= Latin rhythmic hexameter =

Type of poetic meter based on stress

The Latin rhythmic hexameter or accentual hexameter is a kind of Latin dactylic hexameter which arose in the Middle Ages alongside the metrical kind. The rhythmic hexameter did not scan correctly according to the rules of classical prosody; instead it imitated the approximate sound of a typical metrical hexameter by having roughly the same number of syllables and putting word accents in approximately the same places in the line.

The rhythmic hexameter flourished between the 3rd and 9th century A.D. The earliest examples come from what is now Tunisia in north Africa. One poet to use it for literary compositions was Commodian, who is thought to have lived in North Africa in the 3rd century A.D. Other examples come from Portugal, Spain, Lombardy in northern Italy, and southern France. Several examples are found on tombstones, but there is also an anonymous Christian work of the 6th or 7th century called Exhortatio poenitendi, and a book of riddles of the 8th century.

Over the centuries the style of the rhythmic hexameter underwent various changes; for example, in some early versions it had six stresses in each line, whereas later it had five. It has been suggested by one scholar that in its later form, with its five stresses with a caesura between the second and third, it eventually developed in France into the early form of iambic pentameter.

== Metre versus rhythm ==
One of the first scholars to make the distinction between rhythmic and metrical poetry was the English monk Bede in his book On Metre. Basing his definition of rhythm on an earlier one by Marius Victorinus, he defines rhythm as "the composition of words modulated not by metrical quantity but by the number of syllables according to the judgement of the ears".

It seems that not all rhythmic poems were made with equal skill. Bede observes that common people make rhythmic poems "in a rustic way" (rustice), but learned people "in a learned way" (docte). He cites as a good example of a rhythmic poem imitating the iambic metre the hymn O rex aeterne, Domine, and of the trochaic the hymn Apparebit repentina dies magna Domini.

With iambic and trochaic metres, the word accents in the rhythmic style tend to follow the ictus of the metre. However, with a dactylic hexameter, except in the last two feet, where metre and accent coincide, this is not the case, and the accent does not usually coincide with the beginning of a foot. A rhythmic hexameter, therefore, generally has the last two accents fixed, but the earlier ones variable, the first accent occurring sometimes on the 1st, sometimes on the 2nd, 3rd, or even 4th syllable.

== Accent in the metrical hexameter ==
A typical metrical hexameter is made up of six feet, each of which can be either a dactyl (– u u) or a spondee (– –), the last two feet almost always being dactyl + spondee (– u u | – x) (the final syllable can be long or short). Thus the general scheme or pattern is:

– u u | – u u | – u u | – u u | – u u | – x

There is a usually a break, called a caesura, in the middle of the 3rd foot. Thus a typical line might be:

–   u u | – –|–     –|– –| – u u| –  –
at pater Aeneas, / audito nomine Turni

Sometimes, instead of a third-foot caesura, there is a break in the 2nd and 4th foot, but this is much less common:

– u   u|–    u u | – –|–    – |–  u  u |–  –
inde toro / pater Aeneas / sic orsus ab alto

From an accentual point of view, usually there are two stresses in the first part of the line, and three in the second. In some lines, however, there are three stresses in the first half:

–  u  u|–   u  u|–      –|–    –|  – u  u |– –
árma virúmque cáno, / Tróiae qui prímus ab óris

  –  –  |– u u| –  u    u|– u u|– u   u|– –
spárgens úmida mélla / sopóriferúmque papáver

The number of syllables in each half varies. In the first half it is from 5 to 8; in the second half from 8 to 10. In the last two feet, it seems that poets sought in most lines to make the word accent coincide with the verse rhythm, and so usually the last word in the line has either two or three syllables, which ensures this coincidence. Only very rarely does a verse end in a monosyllable, and it is usually for special effect.

A poet writing a rhythmic hexameter, therefore, would follow the same rules. For example, in Commodian's poetry, the second half of each line has 8 to 10 syllables, and as in Virgil, the last word has either two or three syllables. The first half of the line usually has six syllables, but occasionally 5 or 7.

Dag Norberg writes: "The study of quite complicated rhythmic verse forms, which we have dealt with so far, has taught us that these forms were created in the following way: the poet read the quantitative models while noticing, not the quantity or the ictus, but the prose accent and the distribution of the different types of words; and in the new poetry he tried to render these accents and this structure in a more or less exact way without caring about the quantity or the ictus."

In his study of the historical development of rhythmic poems, J. J. Schlicher writes: "Rhythmical poetry was based upon the natural judgement of the ear rather being based than upon rules."

== Urbanilla ==
Perhaps the earliest example of rhythmic hexameter comes from what is now Tunisia. From a tomb near Gafsa 200 miles south of Carthage comes the following inscription. It has been dated to the early 3rd century A.D. and so is probably earlier than Commodian's poems. The style is different from Commodian's 2 + 3 stresses per line; instead, like Venantia's and Oppilanus's epitaphs from Spain (see below) there seem to be three stressed words in each half line. It is possible that some lines (e.g. 2 and 4) are meant to be divided into three as in some lines in Oppilanus's epitaph:

Vrbanilla mihi coniunx / verecundia plena hic sita est
Romae comes / negotiorum socia / parsimonio fulta
Bene gestis omnibus, / cum in patria mecum rediret
Au! miseram Carthago / mihi eripuit sociam
Nulla spes vivendi / mihi sine coniuge tali.
Illa domum servare / meam, illa et consilio iuvare.
Luce privata, misera / quescit in marmore clusa
Lucius ego coniunx / hic te marmore texi
Anc nobis sorte dedit / fatu cum luci daremur.

Urbanilla, my wife full of modesty, lies here.
In Rome she was my companion, a business partner supported by thrift.
After everything had gone well, when she was returning with me to our homeland,
Alas! Carthage snatched my poor partner from me.
There is no hope for me of living without such a wife.
She used to keep my house, she also used to help me with her advice.
Deprived of light, poor woman, she rests enclosed in marble.
I Lucius, your husband, have covered you here with marble.
This is the lot Fate gave us when we were being given to the light.

Burger compares some of the lines to lines of Virgil which have similar accentuation:

Au! míseram / Carthágo míhi / erípuit sóciam
cf. haud áliter / puppésque túae / pubésque tuórum (Virgil, Aen. 1.399)

ánc nobis sórte dédit / fátu cum lúci darémur.
cf. néc latuére dóli / frátrem Iunónis et írae. (Aen. 1.130)

The omission of final -m in sorte(m), fatu(m) reflects contemporary pronunciation, according to Friedrich Hanssen, who made a study of the prosodic features of Commodian's poetry (patria, however, is ablative). The word sociam must be scanned as two syllables, and consilio as three to get the correct rhythm in the last two feet; similarly negotiorum has four syllables. This feature, called synaeresis, is also frequently found in Commodian's verse. Norberg counted more than 90 examples of synaeresis in Augustine's Psalmus where, because there are exactly 8 syllables in each half line (e.g. abundantia peccatorum), synaeresis is easy to spot.

Like the poems in Commodian's Instructiones, this epitaph has an acrostic in the initial letters of the lines, in this case spelling out the name "Urbanilla" (hence the unusual spelling anc for hanc in the last line). In the last three lines, with luce, Lucius, luci, the author plays on his own name.

Burger suggests that in some, but not all, of the verses there is an assonance or rhyme between the two halves of the verse: vivendi/tali, servare/iuvare, misera/clusa. This feature is sometimes seen in other examples of rhythmic hexameter verse.

== Commodian ==
Apart from such inscriptions, the earliest surviving hexameter poetry in the rhythmic style is believed to be that of Commodian, whom one of the manuscripts of his Carmen Apologeticum describes as Episcopus Africanus "African Bishop". His date is probably 3rd century, although some have argued for the 4th or 5th century. There are indications in his poetry that he may indeed have lived in North Africa, although it is possible that he originally came from Gaza, since the last poem in his book Instructiones, quoted below, in which the name "Commodianus" is hidden in a reverse acrostic, is entitled Nomen Gasei or Nomen Gazaei.

The lack of attention to the length or shortness of vowels in the Urbanilla epitaph and in Commodian's poetry may in fact be a North African feature, since St Augustine tells us, in the 4th book of his On Christian Doctrine, published in 426, that the people of the region made no distinction between long and short vowels, pronouncing ōs "mouth" and os "bone" identically. (See African Romance.) Augustine in his book on Music imagines a dialogue between a pupil and teacher in which the pupil admits that he can hear the difference between long and short syllables but adds "the trouble is, that without being taught I have no idea which syllables are supposed to be long and which short". The grammarian Consentius (5th century) agreed that it was a characteristic of African pronunciation to say pīper and ŏrātor instead of piper and ōrātor. But it seems that in other parts of the Roman world, distinctions of vowel length continued to be observed until at least the 5th century.

Commodian wrote two books of rhythmic hexameter poetry, one called Instructiones, consisting of 80 short poems, and the other the 1055-line Carmen Apologeticum Contra Paganos or Carmen de Duobus Populis. The following is an example from Instructiones:

Incolae caelorum / futuri cum Deo Christo
Tenente principium, / vidente cuncta de caelo
Simplicitas, bonitas / habitet in corpore vestro
Irasci nolite / sine causa fratri devoto
Recipietis enim / quidquid feceritis ab illo
Hoc placuit Christo / resurgere mortuos imo
Cum suis corporibus, / et quos ignis ussit in aevo
Sex milibus annis / completis mundo finito.

O you who will be inhabitants of the heavens with the God Christ,
who holds the beginning, and sees everything from heaven:
let simplicity and goodness inhabit your body;
do not be angry without cause with a devoted brother,
for you will receive back from him whatever you have done.
For this reason it pleased Christ that the dead should rise from Hell
with their bodies, even those whom fire has burnt for an age,
when six thousand years are completed at the end of the world.

Like the Urbanilla epitaph, Commodian's hexameters do not scan metrically, but accentually. In the first halves of the lines, as Thurneysen shows, the accentual patterns closely match line openings found in Virgil. For example:

- íncolae caelórum (line 1):

cf. déserit et múros (Aen. 12.698)

- tenénte princípium (line 2), simplícitas bónitas (line 3), cum súis corpóribus (line 7):

cf. excíderant ánimo (Aen. 1.26)

- irásci nolíte (line 4), hoc plácuit Chrísto (line 6), sex mílibus ánnis (line 9):

cf. insígnum pietáte (Aen. 1.10) or at páter Aenéas (Aen. 5.545)

- recipiétis énim (line 5):

cf. artificúmque mánus (Aen. 1.455)

Or possibly, if recipietis was pronounced as 4 syllables by synaeresis, it was like Virgil's at regína grávi (Aen. 4.1).

The second halves of Commodian's lines also have accentual patterns which imitate those of Virgil, but with some exceptions.

Another example from Instructiones is:

In Lege praecepit / Dominus caeli terrae marisque
Nolite, inquit, / adorare deos inanes
De manibus vestris / factos ex ligno vel auro
Indignatio mea / ne vos disperdat ob ista. Instructiones 2.

In the Law the Lord of heaven, earth, and sea instructed:
Do not, He said, worship false gods
Made by your hands from wood or gold;
Let my indignation not destroy you because of them.

In this example, the words lege and caeli must be pronounced with two short vowels each, but deos is pronounced with a long first syllable. The words nolite inquit are pronounced as five syllables without elision, and in indignatio mea, the ending -tio is pronounced as one syllable by synezesis.

In most lines of Commodian, as in the above, there are five accents. The 4th and 5th accent are generally fixed but the 1st, 2nd, and 3rd are variable in position, just as in Virgil's hexameters. However, in the great majority of lines the pre-caesura accent comes on the 5th syllable. Between the 2nd and 3rd accent there is always a caesura, and there is also often a word-break at the end of the 4th foot.

However, although Commodian's verse seems to have been mainly accentual, yet it was also partly metrical. For although he could write fratri devoto at the end of a verse, ignoring the length of the unaccented syllables, yet the stressed syllables in the last two feet were usually metrically long. He only rarely finishes a verse with a word like iter or bibant which in classical Latin has a short accented syllable.

Because of this, Dag Norberg, a specialist in medieval versification, wrote: "We also do not agree with those who consider Commodian to be representative of the new rhythmic poetry. The many traces of quantity that we find in his verses indicate that he intended to write in ordinary hexameters but that he failed in his undertaking. If we are right on this point, then Commodian no longer represents a new system but rather the absence of system and the presence of barbarousness." However, Commodian's works are accepted as rhythmic hexameters by other scholars such as Thurneysen, Burger, and Baldwin and in fact the construction of his verses is very close to that of the Exhortatio Poenitendi, which Norberg accepted as rhythmic.

The lines in the first example above all have a rhyme in -o, but most of Commodian's poems have no rhyme. All the poems in Instructiones have an acrostic in their first letters. This one has a reverse acrostic, reading COMMODIANVS MENDICVS CHRISTI ("Commodian, Christ's beggar").

Commodian was evidently a well-read man: in his writings there are possible echoes of no fewer than 56 pagan authors, especially Virgil, and it is generally thought that he wrote in accentual hexameters not from lack of skill but because he wished to communicate his message more effectively to his relatively less well educated audience. After Commodian, there were only a few writers who used the rhythmic hexameter for literary compositions, and many of the examples are from epitaphs.

One advantage which rhythmic hexameters gave Commodian, as R. Browning pointed out, is that it enabled him to include various words such as diabolus, occisio, nativitas, spiritalis, suscitare, archisynagoga, concupiscentia, saeculum which would be difficult to fit into conventional metre.

== Severa ==
This loss of knowledge of length of syllables seems to have been not just confined to north African speakers but even in Rome, where about A. D. 300 an epitaph was composed for a ten-year-old girl, Severa. In this there are numerous false quantities in the vowels, such as cūbiculum – u u –, lǔminare u u – u, sībi – u, Sēvērā – – – (instead of Sevēra), Papăe sui – u u –, membrā – –, pārentibus – – u u; and even some closed syllables are counted as short, e.g. arcisoliis u u – u u, Marcellini u u – u. It begins as follows:

Cubiculum duplex / cum arcisoliis et luminare
iussu papae sui / Marcellini diaconus iste
Severus fecit / mansionem in pace quietam
sibi suisque memor, / quo membra dulcia somno
per longum tempus / factori et iudici servet
Severa dulcis / parentibus et famulisque
reddidit (octavo) / Febrarias virgo kalendas.

This double bedroom with niches and a window
by order of his Pope, Marcellinus, the deacon
Severus made as a quiet resting-place in peace
for himself and his family in remembrance, where
Severa, beloved to her parents and servants,
for a long time for her Creator and Judge,
might preserve her sweet limbs in sleep;
she died still a girl on the 8th day before the Kalends of February.

== Epitaphs from Portugal and Spain ==
=== Venantia ===
In Évora in Portugal is a tombstone dating to the 6th century Visigothic era with the following poem. (See del Hoyo (2015) for photographs of the stone.) The verse is constructed on a different principle from Commodian's. In the first half of many (or perhaps all) of the lines, there are three stresses instead of Commodian's two. The 3rd line (and perhaps also the 4th and 6th) appear to be divided into three sections, in the same way as in Oppilanus's epitaph below:

Dum simul dulcem / cum viro carpere(m) vitam,
ilico me Fortuna tulit / semper noxsea cuntis.
Vita(m) dum vix(i), Venantia nomen. In seculo gesi
ter deciens quater / in pace quietos per annos.
Ultimum iam solvi devitum / comunem omnibus unum.
Hoc loco erga meos / elegi quiescere proles,
(du)dum quos Dominus vocavit / purgatos unda labacri.

While I was enjoying a peaceful life with my husband,
Fortune, always hostile to everyone, suddenly took me.
As long as I lived my life, Venantia was my name. In the world I have lived
for three times fourteen quiet years in peace.
I have already paid my last debt, the one common to all.
I have chosen to rest in this place next to my children,
whom the Lord called not long ago purified by the water of baptism.

At the bottom of the stone, not part of the poem, is the date given using the Spanish era (a system of dating beginning from 38 BC): "She rested in peace on the eleventh day before the Kalends of February of the era 581," that is 22 January 543 A.D.; although the date is hard to read and some have thought it says not DLXXXI but DCXXXI, fifty years later. The words expressing Venantia's age (3x 10x 4x) are somewhat ambiguous and the mason has added "XIV" above to make it clear.

Interesting for linguists are the confusion of b and v, typical of Spanish (devitum/debitum, labacri/lavacri), the reduction of double consonants (ges(s)i, com(m)unem, ae pronounced e (seculo, and the simplification of cunctis to cuntis.

Also notable is the alliteration dum ... dulcem; viro ... vitam; vitam ... vixi; quater ... quietos. In some lines there seems to be assonance between the two halves: dulcem ... vitam; vixi ... gessi; debitum ... unum; meos ... proles; vocabit ... lavacri.

=== Oppila ===
In Villafranca near Córdoba in Spain is the following epitaph made for Oppila (or Oppilanus), a Visigothic nobleman of the seventh century. The division of each line into two halves is made clear by the assonance at the end of each half in most lines (saxa/membra, natalium/conspicuum, pollens/cluens etc.) The 9th and 11th lines are divided into three by this method.

Like Urbanilla's and Venantia's epitaphs, there are three stresses in each half of each line. One characteristic of this poem is that in several lines there are more than two unstressed syllables between the last two accents and for this reason some scholars have questioned whether they are in fact hexameters.

Haec cava saxa / Oppilani continet membra,
glorioso ortu natalium, / gestu abituque conspicuum.
opibus quippe pollens / et artuum viribus cluens
iacula vehi precipitur / predoque Bacceis destinatur.
in procinctum belli necatur / opitulatione sodalium desolatus.
naviter cede perculsum / cli(e)ntes rapiunt peremtum,
exanimis domu reducitur, / suis a vernulis humatur.
Lugit coniux cum liberis, / fletibus familia prestrepit.
decies ut ternos / ad quater quaternos / vixit per annos,
pridie Septembrium idus / morte a Vasconibus multatus.
era sescentesima / et octagensima / id gestum memento.
sepultus sub die quiescit / VI id(us) Octubres

These hollow rocks contain the limbs of Oppila.
Born in a glorious family, conspicuous in his bearing and appearance.
For he was powerful in wealth, and famous in the strength of his arms.
He was taught to ride (with) javelins, and was destined to be a marauder of the Baccei.
He was killed in a battle in the war, deprived of the help of his companions.
After he was cut down, his followers snatched his dead body.
He was brought home lifeless, and was buried by his own slaves.
His wife and children mourned him, and the household cried aloud with weeping.
When he had lived for ten times three, and four times four, years
On the eve of the Ides of September he was killed by the Basques.
Remember this was done in the 680th "era" (i.e. 642 A.D.)
He rests here buried on the 6th day before the October Ides.

The first line recalls the inscription on Bede's tomb in Durham Cathedral, except that Bede's inscription is a metrical hexameter:

hac sunt in fossa / Baedae venerabilis ossa

The 9th and 11th line are similar in construction to the Leonine verses in Bernard of Cluny's 12th-century poem De contemptu mundi:

Hora novissima, / tempora pessima / sunt, vigilemus

== Bella consurgunt ==
Also from the 7th century is the following poem which is quoted in a work by Virgilius Maro Grammaticus. He calls the style liniati versus ("anointed, or overlaid verses"). These are very unusual for rhythmic hexameters, since every line has a word accent on the 1st, 4th, 6th, 9th and 12th syllable, the words being arranged in 2, 3, 2, 3, and 3 syllables. The lines also rhyme in couplets:

bella consurgunt / poli praesentis sub fine
precae temnuntur / senum suetae doctrinae
regis dolosi / fovent dolosos tyrannos
dium cultura / molos neglecta per annos.

Wars break out at the end of this world,
the usual prayers according to the teaching of the old people are neglected;
Treacherous kings support treacherous tyrants;
The worship of the gods has been neglected for many years.

Virgilius informs us that he was an Aquitanian, from the Basque-speaking region of Bigorre in south-west France.

In its placing of the accents and number of syllables, the pattern of line is similar to Virgil's

ibant obscuri / sola sub nocte per umbram

Lines of this type are also sometimes found in Commodian, but rarely, for example:

idcirco caecus / caecum in fossa reducit
"For this reason one blind person leads another into a ditch."

What is unusual here, however, is the repetition of the same pattern in all four lines.

== Exhortatio poenitendi ==
Written in simple Latin rhythmic hexameters is a work of 174 lines called Exhortatio poenitendi ("An exhortation to repent"). The author is unknown; it was formerly thought it was by Verecundus of Iunca, a 6th-century bishop from what is now Tunisia, but recent opinion is that it is not by him. Others have suggested it may come from the circle of the 7th-century Isidore of Seville. Dag Norberg suggested it may have been composed by Sisebert, who was Archbishop of Toledo in the late 7th century.

The poem has some irregular lines, but in most lines, as with Commodian, the pre-caesura accent falls on the 5th syllable, and in this it resembles the epitaphs from Lombardy and the riddles below. There are either two or three accents in the first half of each line and three in the second. In the first half of each line there are 6 to 8 syllables (rarely 5), and in the second half 8 to 10 syllables (rarely 7). The caesura in each line is easily found. One difference from Commodian is that in the fifth foot the unaccented syllables are sometimes closed (e.g. expurgat in line 4 or impietates relinquat in line 12).

Quamvis sis peccator / impius, malignus, iniquus,
Criminis omni genere / contagioque pollutus,
Pete a Deo veniam, / haesitans nequaquam in fide,
Qui omni peccamine / cunctos poenitentes expurgat.
Omne dimittit facinus / vera poenitudo delicti,
Nec est crimen ullum / quod nequaquam lacrymae tergant.
Quamvis de justitia / terreat judicii dies,
Nunc misericordia / certa poenitudo potitur.
Delinquentem Deus / de praeterito damnat,
Si bonus ex malo / fuerit extremo repertus,
Ut dicitur impio, / si impietates relinquat,
Opera justitiae / faciat, extremo conversus,
Impietas illius / omnis oblita demetur,
Mortique sublatus / aeterna per saecula vivet.

Although you may be a sinner, impious, malign, unjust,
polluted by every kind of crime and by contagion,
seek forgiveness from God, in no way hesitating in faith,
Who purges all penitents from every sin.
True penitence of the sinner dismisses every crime,
nor is there any crime which tears cannot wipe away.
Although the Day of Judgement may terrify for its justice,
At the present time, unwavering penitence obtains mercy.
God condemns the delinquent for his past,
but if a man formerly bad is found in the end to be good,
as is said to the impious, if he abandons his impieties,
and does works of justice, finally converted,
that impiety of his will all be forgotten and removed,
and, rescued from death, he will live for eternal ages.

== Epitaphs from Italy ==
=== Sinodus ===
The next examples of rhythmic hexameter cited by Thurneysen are a series of epitaphs from Lombardy in Northern Italy. The following, dating to 6th/7th century, comes from Vercelli to the west of Milan. It has an acrostic with the name SINODVS DIA(conus). This poem has the characteristic that in some lines (4, 5, 6, 7, 8) there is only one unaccented syllable between the last two stresses, a feature found only very rarely in Commodian. In all the lines except the 6th an accent comes on the 5th syllable.

The original stone of this epitaph is no longer available, and different sources give different texts. It is not known if the poem continued beyond the ten lines below. The caesuras marked below are suggested by Thurneysen, assuming that ádtumuláta and phílosophórum have a double stress.

Species venústa, / mens cui aderat prisca
Iacis inde flébilis, / adtumulata ecce,
Nardei qui sédulo / et ambaris odorem
Ore spirabas dógmata / philosophorum more
Diaconati grátia / ipsaque inter omnes
Virtute praecellébas / admiranda valde.
Splendida de sórte / Romulaeque melitae fontis
Derivatus némpe / quacunque parentum parte
Indolis hic móri / maluit quam vivere fallax.
Animo elégit / totumque propositum fixit.

You whose appearance was charming, and whose mind was of former times,
You lie here to be wept over, in a tomb, behold.
You who constantly − the perfume of nard and ambergris −
from your mouth breathed dogmas in the manner of philosophers,
Thanks to your deaconship, and amongst them all
you were preeminent in most admirable virtue.
From a splendid lot and of the honeyed Romulean fountain
Being an offshoot without doubt on whichever side of his family,
This young man preferred to die than to live as a deceiver;
With his mind he chose and held fast to his whole proposal.

=== Cuningpert ===
The following epitaph from Pavia in Lombardy is that of king Cuningpert or Cunipert, who died in A.D. 700. The poem is very irregularly made, especially lines 3 and 5, and some scholars have denied that it can be considered a true rhythmic hexameter poem.

Aureo ex fonte / quiescunt in ordine reges,
Avus, pater, hic / filius heiulandus tenetur,
Cuningpert florentissimus / ac robustissimus rex,
Quem dominum Italia, / patrem atque pastorem,
Inde flebile maritum / iam viduata gemet.
Alia de parte / si origine quaeras,
Rex fuit avus, mater / gubernacula tenuit regni,
Mirandus erat forma, pius, / mens, si requiras, miranda.

From a golden source, kings lie in a row,
Grandfather, father, and son are held here to be mourned over,
Cuningpert, a most flourishing and mighty king,
whom Italy mourns as master, father, and shepherd,
and now, widowed, as a husband to be wept over.
Otherwise, if you were to seek his origin,
his grandfather was king, his mother held the steering oars of the kingdom;
he was remarkable in beauty, pious, and his mind, if you ask, was remarkable.

Thurneysen suggests that the third line has a threefold division:

Cuningpert / floréntissimus / et robústissimus rex

=== Thomas ===
The following epitaph of a certain Thomas was recorded by the Cardinal Caesar Baronius in the 16th century, but without any indication of its date or place. Charles Troya (1853) believes it was written for a certain deacon Thomas c. 700, and refers it to the ending of the schismatic Patriarchate of Old Aquileia in 698.

The construction of this poem differs from the others here. There are six syllables in each first hemistich, and 8 in the second. The pre-caesura accent comes not on the 5th syllable as in several of the other examples here, but on the 4th; thus the first half-line resembles Virgil's síc fatur lácrimans rather than última Cumaéi. The lines are joined into couplets by assonance at the line end and the balance of the ideas expressed. It begins as follows:

Quis mihi tríbuat, / ut fletus cessent immensi
Et luctus ánimae / det locum vera dicenti?
Licet in lácrimis / singultus verba erumpant,
De te certíssime / tuus discipulus loquar.
Te generósitas, / minister Christi, parentum
Te munda áctio, / Thomas, monstrabat honestum.
Tecum virgínitas / ab incunabilis vixit.
Tecumque véritas / ad vitae metam permansit.

Who will grant me that my immense weepings may cease
and the mourning of my soul give a place to one who speaks the truth?
Even though in my tears my words may break out in sobs,
I, your disciple, will speak most certainly about you.
The good family of your parents, servant of Christ,
And your pure living, Thomas, showed your nobility.
Virginity lived with you from the cradle;
And truth remained with you until the end of life's course.

Some of the remaining lines, however, are more irregular, and appear in places to have been miscopied.

Tu casto labio / pudica verba promebas
Tu patientiam / patiendo pie docebas
Te semper sobrium / te recinebamus modestum
Tu tribulantium / eras consolatio verax
Errore veteri / diu Aquilegia caeca
Diffusam caelitus / rectam dum renueret fidem
Aspera viarum / ninguidosque montium calles
Calcans indefessus / glutinasti prudens scissos.

You with chaste lips brought out modest words;
You by suffering piously taught patience;
We always sang of your sobriety and modesty;
You were the true consolation of those in tribulation.
Aquileia had for a long time been blind with an ancient error,
rejecting the right faith spread from heaven;
Treading the harshness of the roads and the snowy passes of the mountains
Without tiring, you wisely glued back those who had been torn off.

=== Cumianus ===
Another epitaph, from Bobbio, is on the tomb of the Irish bishop Cumianus, dated 736. The tomb has the following rhythmic hexameter poem on it. Like the poems of Commodian, this epitaph has five accents per line with a caesura between the 2nd and the 3rd. The 2nd accent is placed always on the 5th syllable; the 1st and 3rd accents are free:

Hic sacra beáti / membra Cumiani solvuntur,
cuius coelum pénetrans / anima cum angelis gaudet.
iste fuit mágnus / dignitate, genere, forma.
hunc misit Scotía / fines ad Italicos senem:
locatus Ebóbio / Domini constrictus amore,
ubi venerándi / dogma Columbani servando
vigilans, jejúnans, / indefessus, sedulo orans
Olympiades quátuor / uniusque curriculo anni
sic vixit felíciter, / ut felix modo credatur,
mitis, prudens, píus, / fratribus pacificus cunctis.
huic aetatis ánni / fuerunt nonies deni,
lustrum quoque únum / mense(n)sque quatuor simul.
at, pater egrégie, / potens intercessor existe
pro gloriosíssimo / Luitprando rege, qui tuum
pretioso lápide / tympum decoravit devotus,
sit ut maniféstum, / almum ubi tegitur corpus.

Here lie the sacred limbs of Cumian;
whose soul, entering heaven, rejoices with the angels.
He was great in dignity, nobility, and beauty.
Ireland sent him as an old man to the lands of Italy:
located in Bobbio, constrained by love of the Lord,
where, by preserving the teaching of the venerable Columban,
keeping watch, fasting, tireless, constantly praying,
for four olympiads and the course of one year
he lived so felicitously that he is believed to be only fortunate,
gentle, wise, pious, peaceful to all brothers.
The years of his life were ninety
and one period of five years and four months altogether.
But, most excellent Father, be a powerful intercessor
for the most glorious King Liutprand, who
has devotedly decorated your tomb with precious stone,
so that it may be manifest where your kindly body is buried.

In every line there is a phrase-end or break in sense at the caesura, making the lines more straightforward than Commodian's. Thurneysen notes that one feature of this poem which is mostly absent from Commodian is that the poet doesn't avoid making the fifth foot end with a closed syllable, such as Cumiani solvuntur. Another difference from Commodian is that he uses words like génere and tégitur in foot 5, and símul and túum in foot six, which have accented vowels which in the classical pronunciation were short.

=== Audoald ===
Another epitaph, found in the city of Pavia about 20 miles south of Milan, of uncertain date, but probably 763, is that of Audoald Duke of Liguria, who died on the feast day of St Thomas the Apostle. There is a photograph of the inscription in de Vingo (2012), p. 141.

Sub regibus Liguriae / ducatum tenuit audax
Audoald armipotens / claris natalibus ortus
victrix cuius dexter(a) / subegit naviter hostes
finitimos et cunctos / longe latequae degentes
belligeras domavit / acies et hostilia castra
maxima cum laude / prostravit Didymus iste
cuius licet corpus / huius sub tegmine cautis
lateat, non fama silet / vulgatis plena triu(m)phis
quem virum qualis / fuerit quantusque per urbem
innotuit laurigerum / et virtus bellica ducem
sexies quidenis / peractis circiter annis
spiritum ad aethera / misit et membra sepulcro
humanda dedit / prima cum indictio esset
die nonarum / iuliarum feria quinta

Under the kings, bold Audoald held the dukedom of Liguria,
powerful in arms, born in a noble family;
whose victorious right hand energetically subdued his enemies,
both neighbouring ones and those living far and wide;
this "Didymus" conquered warring armies
and with greatest praise laid waste hostile camps.
Although his body is concealed beneath the covering of this stone
his fame is not silent, being full of famous triumphs.
This man, what kind he was and how great, throughout the city
his prowess in war has also made the victorious leader notable.
Having lived about six times fifteen years,
he sent his spirit to the heavens and gave his limbs to the tomb
to be buried, when it was the first of the indiction,
on the festive fifth day before the nones of July.

In this poem the first half of each line is irregular compared with the epitaphs of Cumian and Thomas above. Three of the lines above have 8 syllables in the first half, and three have only 5 syllables. The pre-caesura accent falls variously on the 4th, 5th or 6th syllable.

On the other hand, the second half of each line is regular, with 8 or 9 syllables in each one, and the last two feet scan almost metrically.

== Bern Riddles ==
From the 7th or 8th century, of unknown provenance, comes a collection of 63 riddles known as the Bern Riddles or Aenigmata Hexasticha. Each riddle has 6 lines. In every line there are six syllables in the first half and eight in the second, with an accent on the 5th syllable. Usually there is a second caesura after the 9th syllable. The following is entitled de igne ("about fire"):

durus mihi páter, / dura me génerat máter
verbere nam múlto / huius de víscere fúndor
modica prolátus / feror a véntre figúra
sed adulto míhi / datur imménsa potéstas
durum ego pátrem, / duramque móllio mátrem
et quae vitam cúnctis, / haec mihi fúnera praéstat

My father is hard, and a hard mother gives birth to me,
for with much beating I am poured from her womb.
After being brought forth, I am brought out of her belly as a modest figure;
But when grown up, I am given immense power.
I soften my hard father and I soften my hard mother;
And she who provides life for all, gives me death.

== Peter's liberation ==
From the 8th or 9th century comes a poem called De Petri Apostoli Liberatione de Carcere. This is written in rhythmic hexameters according to a very strict pattern, each line being 6 syllables + 8 syllables, with accents on the 1st, 5th, 7th or 8th, 10th and 13th syllables. It begins as follows:

Carcare vallatus, / turba infidelium septus
morti deputatus, / catenis ferreis vinctus
omni custodela / servatus undique, Petre
manus evasisti / funestas tamen Herodis

Walled up in prison, surrounded by a crowd of the unfaithful,
sentenced to death, bound with iron chains,
watched on all sides by all the guard, Peter,
nonetheless you escaped the deadly hands of Herod.

== Duchess Dhuoda ==
The Duchess Dhuoda, wife of the Duke of Septimania in the south of France, wrote a book of advice for her elder son, finishing it in A.D. 843. Most of the book is in prose, but at the end she finishes with two lines of rhythmic hexameter verse, of a form which unlike the poems quoted above has an accent on the 4th syllable of the first half as well as the usual dactyl + spondee ending:

Ad istum támen / sémper recúrre libéllum.
Vale et víge, / nóbilis puer, sémper in Chrísto.

Always return, however, to this little book.
Farewell and be strong, noble boy, always in Christ.

The rhythm of these lines resembles those quoted by the 7th-century grammarian Virgilius Maro (see Bella consurgunt above), who like Dhuoda also came from the Basque region of France.

== Possible development to iambic pentameter ==
It was the suggestion of Rudolf Thurneysen that the rhythmic hexameter with its five accents was the origin of the iambic pentameter. Poems in an early form of iambic pentameter first appeared in France in the 11th century. Those early French and Occitan poems had ten and twelve syllables, with a caesura after the 4th or 5th syllable. The first half of Dhuoda's lines, therefore, is already identical to the first half of the later pentameter as it is found in the Occitan poem Boecis of the early 11th century.

It was Thurneysen's view that with the changes of pronunciation as vernacular Latin turned into French, the dactylic rhythm would automatically be reduced to iambic. For example, (late) Latin debemus bene morire would become in French devum nus bien murir (Rol. 1128); qui plus est pressum de Roma would become qui plus est pres de Rome (Alex. 40,1). However, since nothing survives of French poetry of the 9th and 10th centuries, proof is lacking.

Another scholar, F. J. A. Davidson, argued that it was the origin of the French alexandrine line whose earliest examples are from the 12th century.

== Bibliography ==
- Baldwin, Barry (1989). "Some Aspects of Commodian". Illinois Classical Studies, Vol. 14, No. 1/2 (Spring/Fall 1989), pp. 331–346.
- Beare, W. (1956). "The Origin of Rhythmic Latin Verse". Hermathena, No. 87 (May 1956), pp. 3–20.
- Burger, André (1951). "De Virgile à Guillaume IX: Histoire d'un mètre." Bibliothèque d'Humanisme et Renaissance T. 13, No. 1 (1951), pp. 7–25.
- Carande Herrero, Rocío (2010). "Carmen o no carmen: problemas de catalogación en CIL II 2/5 y CIL II 2/7.". Habis 41 (2010) 219–239.
- Davidson, F. J. A. "The Origin of the French Alexandrine". Modern Language Notes, Vol. 16, No. 2 (Feb., 1901), pp. 39–42.
- del Hoyo, Javier (2015). "Solvi devitum (naturae): Inscripción métrica de Évora". Euphrosyne 43, 2015, pp. 255–263.
- de Vingo, Paolo (2012). "Forms of representation of power and aristocratic funerary rituals in the Langobard Kingdom in northern Italy." Acta Archaeologica 63(1):117-153.
- Frank, Tenney (1924). "Latin Quantitative Speech as Affected by Immigration". The American Journal of Philology, Vol. 45, No. 2 (1924), pp. 161–175.
- Gaeng, Paul A. (1972). "A Note on the Declension of Germanic Personal Names in Latin Inscriptions from Visigothic Spain". Romance Notes, Vol. 13, No. 3 (Spring, 1972), pp. 563–566.
- Goodspeed, E. J. (1946). "The Date of Commodian". Classical Philology, Vol. 41, No. 1 (Jan., 1946), pp. 46–47.
- Hanssen, Fr. (1881). "De Arte Metrica Commodiani". Argentorati (= Strassburg).
- Heikkenen, Seppo (2012). The Christianisation of Latin Metre: A Study of Bede’s De arte metrica. (University of Helsinki Dissertation).
- Klopsch, Paul (1991). "Der Übergang von Quantitierender zu Akzentuierender Lateinische Dichtung". In: Tristram, H.L.C. (ed.) Metriek und Medienwechsel: Metrics and Media, pp. 95–106.
- Lepschy, Giulio (2014). History of Linguistics, vol. 2: Classical and Medieval Linguistics. Routledge.
- Ludwig, E. (1878). Commodiani Carmina, part 1: Instructiones. Leipzig.
- Ludwig, E. (1877). Commodiani Carmina, part 2: Carmen Apologeticum. Leipzig.
- Migne, I.P. (1844) (ed.). Patrologia Latina, vol. 83, containing Exhortatio Poenitendi.
- Mossong, Isabelle (2022). Der Klerus des spätantiken Italians im Spiegel epigraphischer Zeugnisse. Volume 36 in the series KLIO / Beihefte. Neue Folge. de Gruyter.
- Norberg, Dag (1954). La poésie latine rythmique du haut moyen âge. (Studia Latina Holmiensia, ii.)
- Norberg, Dag (1985). "Indoles". In Archivum Latinitatis Medii Aevi, Vol. 15, pp. 217–219.
- Norberg, Dag (transl. 2004). An Introduction to the Study of Medieval Latin Versification. 1st ed. 1958, Translated in 2004 by G. C. Roti and J. de la Chapelle Skubly.
- Reardon, W. J. (2004). The Deaths of the Popes, p. 52.
- Schlicher, John J. (1900). The origin of rhythmical verse in late Latin. PhD thesis. Chicago.
- Strong, H. A. "Some Notes on Virgilius Maro Grammaticus" The Classical Review Vol. 27, No. 3 (May, 1913), pp. 81–83.
- Thurneysen, R. (1887). "Der Weg vom dactylischen Hexameter zum epischen Zehnsilber der Franzosen.". Zeitschr. f. rom. Phil. XI.
- Winterbottom. M. (1978), "Review of Verecundi Iuncensis Commentarii super Cantica Ecclesiastica edited by R. Demeulenaere" The Journal of Theological Studies, New Series, vol 29.
