= Etymologiae =

Etymological encyclopedia compiled by Isidore of Seville

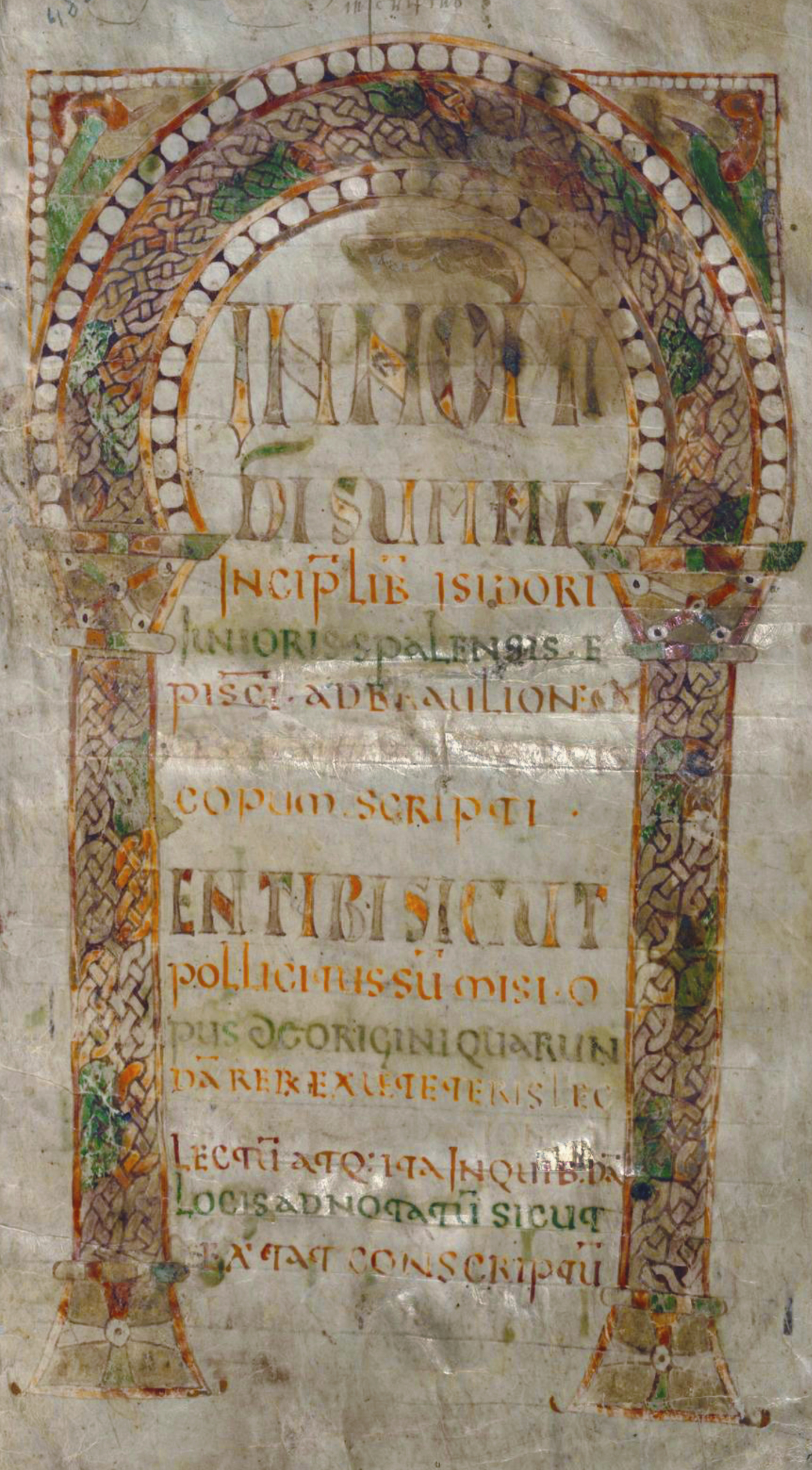
- Title page of Etymologiae, Carolingian manuscript (8th century) – Royal Library of Belgium, Brussels
- Author: Isidore of Seville
- Language: Late Latin
- Subject: General knowledge; Etymology
- Genre: Encyclopedia
- Publication date: c. 625
- Publication place: Visigothic Kingdom
- Media type: Manuscript
- Pages: 20 books
- Original text: Etymologiae at Latin Wikisource

Etymologiae (Latin for 'Etymologies'), also known as the Origines ('Origins'), usually abbreviated Orig., is an etymological encyclopedia compiled by the influential Christian bishop Isidore of Seville (c. 560–636) towards the end of his life. Isidore was encouraged to write the book by his friend Braulio, Bishop of Saragossa. Etymologiae summarized and organized a wealth of knowledge from hundreds of classical sources; three of its books are derived largely from Pliny the Elder's Natural History. Isidore acknowledges Pliny, but not his other principal sources, namely Cassiodorus, Servius, and Gaius Julius Solinus.

Etymologiae covers an encyclopedic range of topics. Etymology, the origins of words, is prominent, but the work also covers, among other things, grammar, rhetoric, mathematics, geometry, music, astronomy, medicine, law, the church and heretical sects, pagan philosophers, languages, cities, humans, animals, the physical world, geography, public buildings, roads, metals, rocks, agriculture, war, ships, clothes, food, and tools.

Etymologiae was a widely used textbook throughout the Middle Ages. It was so popular that it was read in place of many of the original classics that it summarized; as a result, some of these ceased to be copied and were lost. It was cited by Dante Alighieri (who placed Isidore in his Paradiso), quoted by Geoffrey Chaucer, and mentioned by the poets Boccaccio, Petrarch, and John Gower. Among the thousand-odd surviving manuscript copies is the 13th-century Codex Gigas; the earliest surviving manuscript preserves a fragment of book XI from the 7th century. Etymologiae was printed in at least ten editions between 1472 and 1530, after which its importance faded during the Renaissance. The first scholarly edition was printed in Madrid in 1599; the first modern critical edition was edited by Wallace Lindsay in 1911.

While less well known in modern times, modern scholars recognize the work's importance in preserving both classical texts, as well as insight into the medieval mindset.

== Background ==
Isidore of Seville was born around 560 in Cartagena, and became bishop of Seville. He was widely read, mainly in Latin with a little Greek and Hebrew. He was familiar with the works of both the church fathers and pagan writers such as Martial, Cicero and Pliny the Elder, this last the author of the major encyclopaedia then in existence, the Natural History. The classical encyclopedists had already introduced alphabetic ordering of topics, and a literary rather than observational approach to knowledge: Isidore followed those traditions. Isidore became well known in his lifetime as a scholar. He started to put together the Etymologiae, a collection of his knowledge, in about 600, and continued to write until around 625.

== Overview ==
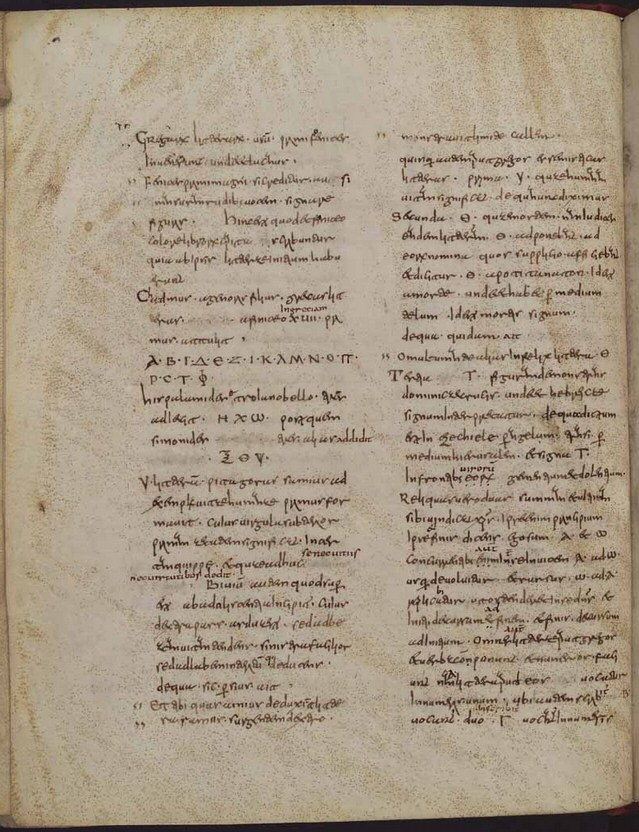
Manuscript page from the start of the Etymologiae, showing the letters of the Greek alphabet. Codex Karolinus, 8th century. Wolfenbüttel digital library.

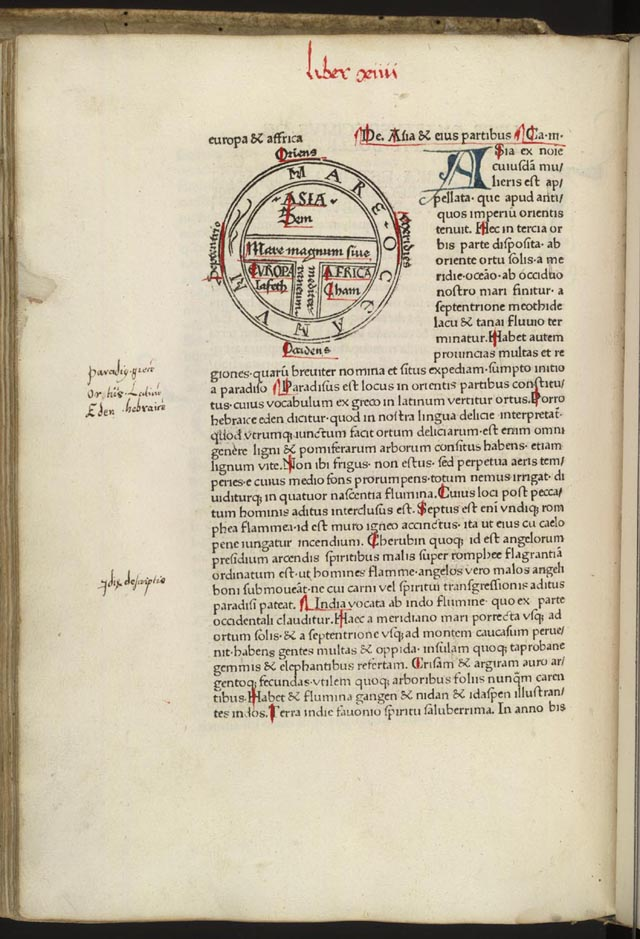
An early printed edition, by Guntherus Zainer, Augsburg, 1472. British Library

The Etymologiae presents an abbreviated form of much of that part of the learning of antiquity that Christians thought worth preserving. Etymologies, often very far-fetched, form the subject of just one of the encyclopedia's twenty books (Book X), but perceived linguistic similarities permeate the work. An idea of the quality of Isidore's etymological knowledge is given by Peter Jones: "Now we know most of his derivations are total nonsense (eg, he derives baculus, 'walking-stick', from Bacchus, god of drink, because you need one to walk straight after sinking a few)".

The work covers many of the subjects of ancient learning, from theology to the construction and provenance of furniture, and provides a rich source of classical lore and learning for medieval writers. Isidore quotes from around 475 works from over 200 authors in his works, including those outside the Etymologiae. Bishop Braulio, to whom Isidore dedicated it and sent it for correction, divided it into its twenty books.

An analysis of Book XII by Jacques André identifies 58 quotations from named authors and 293 borrowed but uncited usages: 79 from Solinus; 61 from Servius; 45 from Pliny the Elder. Isidore takes care to name classical and Christian scholars whose material he uses: in descending order of frequency, Aristotle (15 references), Jerome (10 times), Cato (9 times), Plato (8 times), Pliny, Donatus, Eusebius, Augustine, Suetonius, and Josephus. He mentions as prolific authors the pagan Varro and the Christians Origen and Augustine. But his translator Stephen Barney notes as remarkable that he never actually names the compilers of the encyclopedias that he used "at second or third hand", Aulus Gellius, Nonius Marcellus, Lactantius, Macrobius, and Martianus Capella. Barney further notes as "most striking" that Isidore never mentions three out of his four principal sources (the one he does name being Pliny): Cassiodorus, Servius and Solinus. Conversely, he names Pythagoras eight times, even though Pythagoras wrote no books. The Etymologiae are thus "complacently derivative".

In Book II, dealing with dialectic and rhetoric, Isidore is heavily indebted to translations from the Greek by Boethius; in Book III he is similarly in debt to Cassiodorus, who provided the gist of Isidore's treatment of arithmetic. Caelius Aurelianus contributes generously to the part of Book IV dealing with medicine. Isidore's view of Roman law in Book V is viewed through the lens of the Visigothic compendiary called the Breviary of Alaric, which was based on the Code of Theodosius, which Isidore never saw. Through Isidore's condensed paraphrase a third-hand memory of Roman law passed to the Early Middle Ages. Lactantius is the author most extensively quoted in Book XI, concerning man. Books XII, XIII and XIV are largely based on the Natural History and Solinus, whereas the lost Prata of Suetonius, which can be partly pieced together from what is quoted in the Etymologiae, seems to have inspired the general plan of the work, as well as many of its details.

Isidore's Latin, replete with nonstandard Vulgar Latin, stands at the cusp of Latin and the local Romance language emerging in Hispania. (Note: Examined in detail by Johann Sofer, extensively criticised by Walter Porzig.) According to the prefatory letters, the work was composed at the urging of Braulio, to whom Isidore sent the unedited manuscript at the end of his life, which seems to have begun circulating before Braulio was able to revise and issue it with a dedication to the late Visigothic king Sisebut.

== Contents ==
The Etymologies organizes knowledge, mainly drawn from the classics, into twenty books:

Structure of The Etymologies
Book	Topics	Principal sources
(Whole work)	(Etymological encyclopedia)	the Prata of Suetonius, now lost
Book I: de grammatica	Trivium: grammar	Institutes of Cassiodorus
Book II: de rhetorica et dialectica	Trivium: rhetoric and dialectic	Cassiodorus
Book III: de quatuor disciplinis mathematicis	Quadrivium: arithmetic, geometry, music, astronomy	Boethius on mathematics; Cassiodorus
Book IV: de medicina	medicine	Caelius Aurelianus, Soranus of Ephesus, Pliny
Book V: de legibus et temporibus	law and chronology	Institutes of Gaius, Breviary of Alaric
Book VI: de libris et officiis ecclesiasticis	Ecclesiastical books and offices	Augustine, Jerome, Gregory the Great, Divine Institutes of Lactantius, Tertullian
Book VII: de deo, angelis, sanctis et fidelium ordinibus	God, angels and saints hierarchies of heaven and earth	Augustine, Jerome, Gregory the Great, Lactantius, Tertullian
Book VIII: de ecclesia et sectis diversis	The church, Jews, and heretical sects; pagan philosophers, prophets and sibyls	Augustine, Jerome, Gregory the Great, Lactantius, Tertullian (Christian); Varro, Cicero, Pliny the Elder (pagan)
Book IX: de linguis, gentibus, regnis, militia, civibus, affinitatibus	Languages, peoples, kingdoms, armies, cities and titles	Augustine, Ambrose, Jerome, Servius, Pliny, Solinus (who borrowed from Pliny)
Book X: de vocabulis	Etymologies	Verrius Flaccus via Festus; Servius; the Church Fathers.
Book XI: de homine et portentis	Mankind, portents, and transformations	Books XI – XX all include material from Pliny's Natural History, Servius, Solinus
Book XII: de animalibus	Beasts and birds	Pliny, Servius, Solinus, Hexameron of Ambrose
Book XIII: de mundo et partibus	The physical world, atoms, elements, natural phenomena	as Book XI
Book XIV: de terra et partibus	Geography: Earth, Asia, Europe, Libya, islands, promontories, mountains, caves	as Book XI; Histories Against the Pagans of Paulus Orosius
Book XV: de aedificiis et agris	Public buildings, public works, roads	Columella, Servius
Book XVI: de lapidibus et metallis	Metals and stones	Pliny, Servius, Solinus
Book XVII: de rebus rusticis	Agriculture	Cato via Columella, Pliny, Servius, Solinus, Rutilius Palladius, Varro
Book XVIII: de bello et ludis	Terms of war, games, jurisprudence	Servius; Tertullian on circus games
Book XIX: de navibus, aedificiis et vestibus	Ships, houses, and clothes	Servius; also Jerome, Festus, Pliny, Marcus Cetius Faventinus, Palladius, Nonus Marcellus
Book XX: de penu et instrumentis domesticis et rusticis	Food, tools, and furnishings	as Book XIX

In Book I, Isidore begins with a lengthy section on grammar, the first of three subjects in the mediaeval Trivium considered at the time the core of essential knowledge. He covers the letters of the alphabet, parts of speech, accents, punctuation and other marks, shorthand and abbreviations, writing in cipher and sign language, types of mistake and histories. He derives the word for letters (littera) from the Latin words for "to read" (legere) and 'road' (iter), "as if the term were legitera", arguing that letters offer a road for people who read.

Book II completes the medieval Trivium with coverage of rhetoric and dialectic. Isidore describes what rhetoric is, kinds of argument, maxims, elocution, ways of speaking, and figures of speech. On dialectic, he discusses philosophy, syllogisms, and definitions. He equates the Greek term syllogism with the Latin term argumentation (argumentatio), which he derives from the Latin for "clear mind" (arguta mens).

Book III covers the medieval Quadrivium, the four subjects that supplemented the Trivium being arithmetic, geometry, music, and astronomy. (Note: The accounts of logic in Book II and of arithmetic in Book III are transferred almost word for word from Cassiodorus, Isidore's editor, W. M. Lindsay observed.) He argues that there are infinitely many numbers, as you can always add one (or any other number) to whatever number you think is the limit. He attributes geometry to Ancient Egypt, arguing that because the River Nile flooded and covered the land with mud, geometry was needed to mark out people's land "with lines and measures". Isidore distinguishes astronomy from astrology and covers the world, the sky and the celestial sphere, the zodiac, the Sun, Moon, stars, Milky Way, and planets, and the names of the stars. He derives the curved (curvus) vault of the heavens from the Latin word for "upside-down" (conversus). He explains eclipses of the Sun as the Moon coming between the Earth and the Sun and eclipses of the Moon as happening when it runs into the shadow of the Earth. He condemns the Roman naming of the planets after their gods: Jupiter, Saturn, Mars, Venus, and Mercury. Isidore of Seiville distinguished between a 'Superstitious' astrology (astrologia superstitiosa) from a 'natural' astrology. The first deals with the horoscope and the attempt of foreseeing the future of one or more persons; the latter was a legitimate activity which had concerns with meteorological predictions, including iatromathematics and astrological medicine.

Book IV covers medicine, including the four humours, diseases, remedies and medical instruments. He derives the word medicine from the Latin for "moderation" (modus), and "sciatica" (sciasis) from the affected part of the body, the hip (Greek ἰσχία ischia).

Book V covers law and chronology. Isidore distinguishes natural, civil, international, military and public law among others. He discusses the purpose of law, legal cases, witnesses, offences and penalties. On chronology, Isidore covers periods of time such as days, weeks, and months, solstices and equinoxes, seasons, special years such as Olympiads and Jubilees, generations and ages.

In Book VI, Isidore describes ecclesiastical books and offices starting with the Old and New Testaments, the authors and names of the holy books, libraries and translators, authors, writing materials including tablets, papyrus and parchment, books, scribes, and Christian festivals.

Book VII describes the basic scheme concerning God, angels, and saints: in other words, the hierarchies of heaven and earth from patriarchs, prophets and apostles down the scale through people named in the gospels to martyrs, clergymen, monks and ordinary Christians.

Book VIII covers religion in the shape of the Christian church, the Jews and heretical sects, pagan philosophers including poets, sibyls and magi, and the pagan gods.

Book IX covers languages, peoples, kingdoms, cities and titles.

Book X is a word-list of nouns and adjectives, together with supposed etymologies for them. For example, the letter 'D' begins with the word for master (Dominus), as he is the head of a household (Domus); the adjective docile (docilis) is derived by Isidore from the verb for "to teach" (docere), because docile people are able to learn; and the word for abominable (Nefarius) is explained as being not worth the grain called spelt (far).

Book XI covers human beings, portents and transformations. Isidore derives human beings (homo) from the Latin for soil (humus), as in Genesis 2:7 it says that man is made from the soil. Urine (urina) gets its name either from the fact that it can burn (urere) the skin or, Isidore hedges, that it is from the kidneys (renes). Femina, meaning woman, comes from femora/femina meaning thighs, as this part of the body shows she is not a man. The Latin for buttocks is clunis as they are near the large intestine or colon (colum).

Book XII covers animals, including small animals, snakes, worms, fish, birds and other beasts that fly. Isidore's treatment is as usual full of conjectural etymology, so a horse is called equus because when in a team of four horses they are balanced (aequare). The spider (aranea) is so called from the air (aer) that feeds it. The electric ray (torpedo) is called that because it numbs (torpescere, compare English "torpid") anyone who touches it.

Book XIII describes the physical world, atoms, classical elements, the sky, clouds, thunder and lightning, rainbows, winds, and waters including the sea, the Mediterranean, bays, tides, lakes, rivers and floods. The sky is called caelum, as it has stars stamped on to it, like a decorated pot (caelatus). Clouds are called nubes as they veil (obnubere) the sky, just as brides (nupta) wear veils for their weddings. The wind is called ventus, as it is angry and violent (vehemens, violentus). There are many kinds of water: some water "is salty, some alkaline, some with alum, some sulfuric, some tarry, and some containing a cure for illnesses." There are waters that cure eye injuries, or make voices melodious, or cause madness, or cure infertility. The water of the Styx causes immediate death.

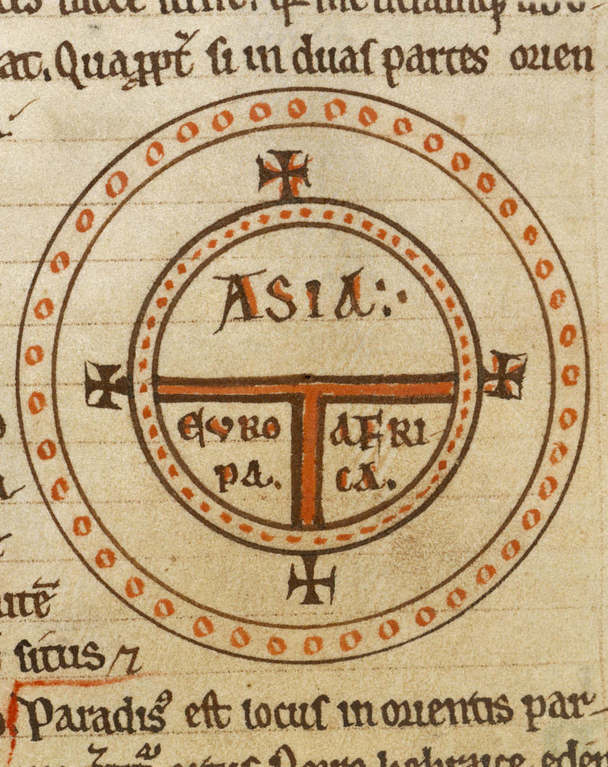
T and O map from the first printed edition of Etymologiae, XIV: de terra et partibus, representing the inhabited world. Augsburg, 1472. The East is at the top, with Asia occupying the top half of the "globe" (orbis).

Book XIV covers geography, describing the Earth, islands, promontories, mountains and caves. The Earth is divided into three parts, Asia occupying half the globe, and Europe and Africa each occupying a quarter. Europe is separated from Africa by the Mediterranean, reaching in from the Ocean that flows all around the land. Isidore writes that the orbis of the Earth, translated by Barney as "globe", "derives its name from the roundness of the circle, because it resembles a wheel; hence a small wheel is called a 'small disk' (orbiculus)". Barney notes that orbis "refers to the 'circle' of lands around the Mediterranean, and hence to the total known extent of land." The fourteenth book of the Etymologies is also often illustrated with a circular T-O map, which gives a vague impression of a flat disc-shaped Earth, though authors disagree about Isidore's beliefs on the matter. (Note: Garwood notes, "St Augustine's stance on the shape of the earth [spherical] was supported, albeit vaguely, by the most popular encyclopedist of the era, St Isidore of Seville".)

Book XV covers cities and buildings including public buildings, houses, storehouses and workshops, parts of buildings, tents, fields and roads.

Book XVI covers metals and rocks, starting with dust and earth, and moving on to gemstones of different colours, glass and mines. Metals include gold, silver, copper, iron, lead, and electrum. Weights and measures end the book. Games with boards and dice are described.

Book XVII describes agriculture, including grains, legumes, vines, trees, aromatic herbs and vegetables.

Book XVIII covers the terms of war, games, and jurisprudence. Isidore describes standards, trumpets, weapons including swords, spears, arrows, slings, battering rams, and armour including shields, breastplates and helmets. Athletic games include running and jumping, throwing and wrestling. Circus games are described, with chariot racing, horse racing and vaulting. In the theatre, comedy, tragedy, mime and dance are covered. In the amphitheatre, Isidore covers those who fight with nets, nooses and other weapons.

Book XIX covers ships including boats, sails, ropes and nets; forges and tools; building, including walls, decorations, ceilings, mosaics, statues, and building tools; and clothes, including types of dress, cloaks, bedding, tools, rings, belts and shoes. The word "net" (rete), is derived from retaining (retinere) fish, or perhaps, writes Isidore, from the ropes (restis) they are attached to.

Book XX completes Isidore's encyclopaedia, describing food and drink and vessels for these, storage and cooking vessels; furnishings including beds and chairs; vehicles, farm and garden tools and equipment for horses.

== Reception ==
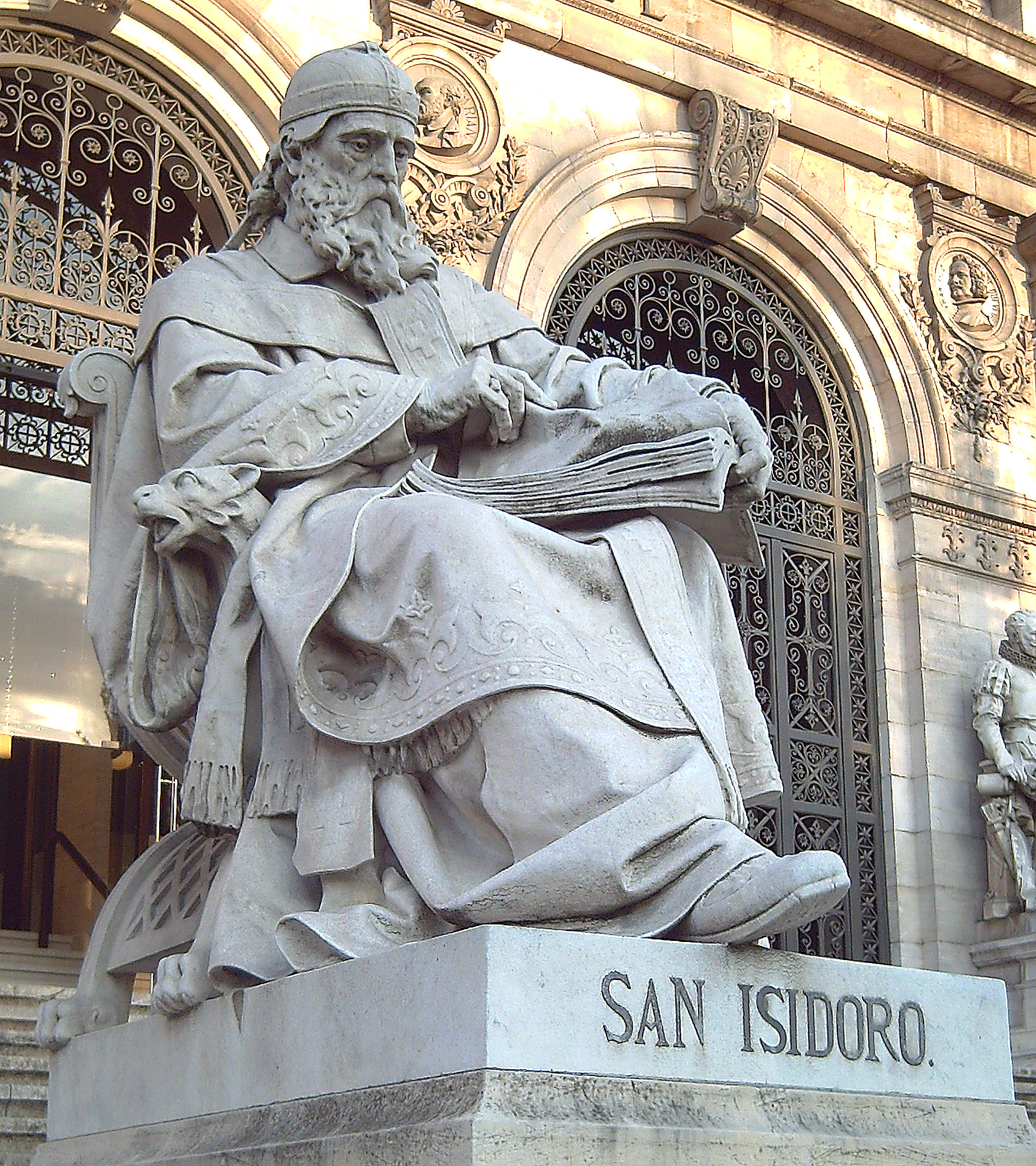
1892 statue of Isidore of Seville in Madrid by José Alcoverro

=== Middle Ages ===
Isidore was widely influential throughout the Middle Ages, feeding directly into word lists and encyclopaedias by Papias, Huguccio, Bartholomaeus Anglicus and Vincent of Beauvais, as well as being used everywhere in the form of small snippets. His influence also pertained to early medieval riddle collections such as the Bern Riddles or the Aenigmata of Aldhelm. He was cited by Dante Alighieri, quoted by Geoffrey Chaucer, and his name was mentioned by the poets Boccaccio, Petrarch and John Gower among others. Dante went so far as to place Isidore in Paradise in the final part of his Divine Comedy, Paradiso (10.130–131).

Throughout the Middle Ages, the Etymologiae was the textbook most in use, regarded so highly as a repository of classical learning that, in a great measure, it superseded the use of the individual works of the classics themselves, full texts of which were no longer copied and thus were lost. It was one of the most popular compendia in medieval libraries.

=== Modern ===
"An editor's enthusiasm is soon chilled by the discovery that Isidore's book is really a mosaic of pieces borrowed from previous writers, sacred and profane, often their 'ipsa verba' without alteration," Wallace Lindsay noted in 1911, having recently edited Isidore for the Clarendon Press, with the further observation, however, that a portion of the texts quoted have otherwise been lost: the Prata of Suetonius, for instance, can only be reconstructed from Isidore's excerpts.

In the view of John T. Hamilton, writing in The Classical Tradition in 2010, "Our knowledge of ancient and early medieval thought owes an enormous amount to this encyclopaedia, a reflective catalogue of received wisdom, which the authors of the only complete translation into English introduce as "arguably the most influential book, after the Bible, in the learned world of the Latin West for nearly a thousand years" These days, Isidore and his Etymologies are anything but household names, though the Vatican has named Isidore the patron saint of the Internet, which is likely to make his work better known.

Ralph Hexter, also writing in The Classical Tradition, comments on "Isidore's largest and massively influential work... on which he was still at work at the time of his death... his own architecture for the whole is relatively clear (if somewhat arbitrary)... At the deepest level Isidore's encyclopedia is rooted in the dream that language can capture the universe and that if we but parse it correctly, it can lead us to the proper understanding of God's creation. His word derivations are not based on principles of historical linguistics but follow their own logic... Isidore is the master of bricolage... His reductions and compilations did indeed transmit ancient learning, but Isidore, who often relied on scholia and earlier compilations, is often simplistic scientifically and philosophically, especially compared to .. figures such as Ambrose and Augustine."

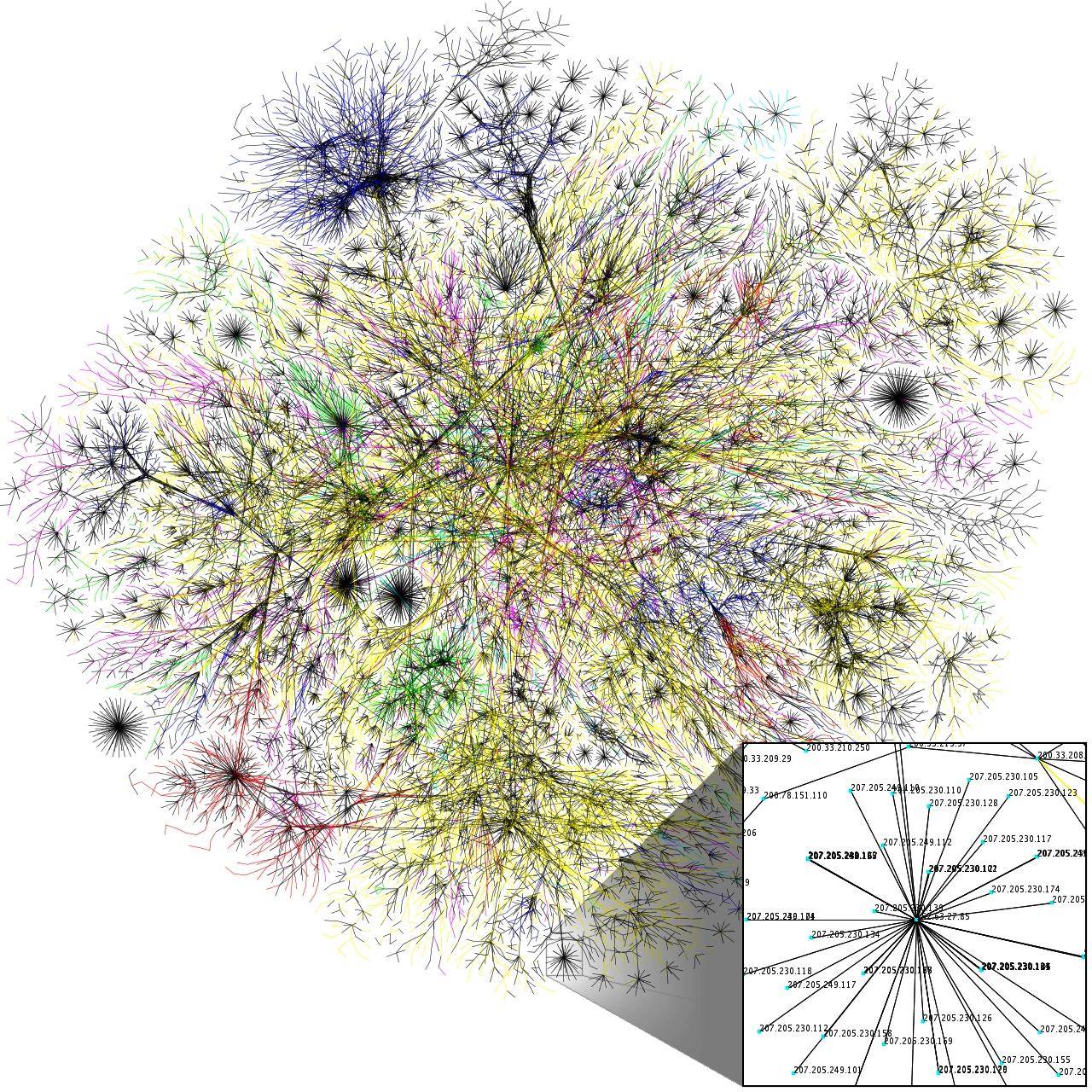
Encyclopedia as network of knowledge: Pope John Paul II considered nominating Isidore of Seville as the patron saint of the Internet

Writing in The Daily Telegraph, Peter Jones compares Etymologiae to the Internet:

One might have thought that Isidore, Bishop of Seville, AD 600-636, had already suffered enough by having Oxford's computerised 'student administration project', planned since 2002, named after him. But five years ago Pope John Paul II compounded his misfortune by proposing (evidently) to nominate [Isidore] as the patron saint of the internet.

It was, indeed, a tempting choice. Isidore's Etymologies, published in 20 books after his death, was an encyclopedia of all human knowledge, glossed with his own derivations of the technical terms relevant to the topic in hand. Derivations apart, it was lifted from sources almost entirely at second or third hand ..., none of it checked, and much of it unconditional eyewash – the internet, in other words, to a T.

By the same token, Isidore's work was phenomenally influential throughout the West for 1,000 years, 'a basic book' of the Middle Ages, as one scholar put it, second only to the Bible. Written in simple Latin, it was all a man needed in order to have access to everything he wanted to know about the world but never dared to ask, from the 28 types of common noun to the names of women's outer garments. Today, one internet connection serves precisely the same purpose.

== Manuscripts and printed editions ==
Almost a thousand manuscript copies of Etymologiae have survived. The earliest is held at the Abbey library of Saint Gall in Switzerland, a 7th-century fragment of Books XI. The 13th-century Codex Gigas held in the National Library of Sweden, the largest extant medieval manuscript, contains a copy of the Etymologiae.

In 1472 at Augsburg, the Etymologiae became one of the first books to be printed, quickly followed by ten more editions by 1500. Juan de Grial produced the first scholarly edition in Madrid in 1599. Faustino Arevalo included it as two of the 17 volumes of his Opera omnia in Rome (1797–1803). Rudolph Beer produced a facsimile edition of the Toledo manuscript of the Etymologiae in 1909. Wallace Lindsay edited the first modern critical edition in 1911. Jacques Fontaine and Manuel C. Diaz y Diaz have between 1981 and 1995 supervised the production of the first five volumes of the Etymologiae in the Belle Lettres series "Auteurs Latins du Moyen Age", with extensive footnotes. The first complete English translation, by S.A. Barney, W.J. Lewis, J.A. Beach and O. Berghof, was published in 2006.

== Bibliography ==
- Barney, Stephen A.; Lewis, W. J.; Beach, J.A.; Berghof, O. (2006). The Etymologies of Isidore of Seville (1st ed.). Cambridge University Press. ISBN 978-0-511-21969-6. Archived from the original on 2021-01-11.
- Brehaut, Ernest (2003) [1912]. An Encyclopedist of the Dark Ages: Isidore of Seville (PDF) (Digital ed.). Columbia University. Archived (PDF) from the original on 2010-11-20.
- Fear, A. T., and Jamie Wood, eds. Isidore of Seville and His Reception in the Early Middle Ages: Transmitting and Transforming Knowledge. Amsterdam: Amsterdam University Press, 2016.
- Garwood, Christine (2007). Flat Earth: The History of an Infamous Idea. Macmillan. ISBN 978-1-4050-4702-9.
- Grant, Edward (1974). A Sourcebook in Medieval Science. Harvard University Press. ISBN 978-0-674-82360-0.
- Hamilton, John T. (2010). "Pliny the Elder". In Grafton, Anthony; Most, Glenn W.; Settis, Salvatore (eds.). The Classical Tradition. Harvard University Press.
- Hexter, Ralph (2010). "Isidore of Seville". In Grafton, Anthony; Most, Glenn W.; Settis, Salvatore (eds.). The Classical Tradition. Harvard University Press.
- Lapidge, Michael (2006). The Anglo-Saxon Library. Oxford University Press. ISBN 978-0-19-153301-3. Archived from the original on 2016-04-26.
- Lindsay, Wallace (1911a). "The Editing of Isidore Etymologiae". The Classical Quarterly. 5 (1): 42–53. doi:10.1017/S0009838800019273. S2CID 170517611.
- Lindsay, Wallace (1911b). Isidori Hispalensis Episcopi Etymologiarum Sive Originum Libri XX. Clarendon Press.
- Porzig, Walter (1937). "Die Rezensionen der Etymologiae des Isidorus von Sevilla". Hermes. 72 (2): 129–170.
- Rusche, Philip G. (October 2005). "Isidore's "Etymologiae" and the Canterbury Aldhelm Scholia". The Journal of English and Germanic Philology. 104 (4): 437–455. JSTOR 27712536.
- Russell, Jeffrey Burton (1991). Inventing the Flat Earth: Columbus and Modern Historians. Praeger. ISBN 978-0-275-95904-3.
- Sofer, Johann (1930). Lateinisches und Romanisches aus den Etymologiae des Isidorus von Sevilla. Göttingen.
- Stevens, Wesley M. (1980). "The Figure of the Earth in Isidore's "De natura rerum"". Isis. 71 (2): 268–77. doi:10.1086/352464. JSTOR 230175. S2CID 133430429.
