= Medieval etymology =

Etymology crafted by Middle Ages scholars

Medieval etymology is the study of the history of words that was conducted by scholars in the European Middle Ages.

Etymology is the study of the origins of words. Before the beginnings of large-scale modern lexicography in the 16th century and the development of the comparative method in the 18th, a scientific etymology (in the sense understood by modern linguistics) was not possible. However, grammarians had always speculated about the origins of words. There are many examples of etymology in the Bible, for example, and in the works of classical writers. In cases where the history of the words was simple, such speculations have sometimes proved correct in the light of modern scholarship, but generally they were based on superficial similarities.

Like classical etymology, Medieval Christian etymology drew tenuous connections between superficially similar words, but exegetical etymology was radically new in what it then did with the connections. The purpose of etymology was to elucidate the spiritual background to a concept, drawing out aspects of semantics in a similar manner to the symbolic interpretation of the natural world.

An example: Hugh of Saint Victor derived the Latin word mors ('death') from morsus ('bite'): a morsu primi hominis qui vetitae arboris pomum mordens mortem incurrit ('from the bite of the first man, who, biting the apple of the forbidden tree, incurs death'). The etymology was thus crafted to teach a spiritual truth. The fact that the same author knew other, alternative and logically incompatible etymologies for the same word (mors comes also from amarus, 'bitter', or from the name of the god of war Mars) did not devalue the lesson, since it was the spiritual meaning and not the philological accuracy which stood in the foreground.

As yet there is still no satisfactory history of Christian etymology, but a very useful discussion of it is that of Friedrich Ohly in his essay "On the spiritual sense of the word in the Middle Ages". Ohly writes:

It would be foolish to deride such an etymology as unscientific if it helped the people of its time to arrive at a deeper signification of the meaning of the word, since it was precisely the task of etymology at that time to illuminate the spiritual meaning of the word. Our modern etymology would have appeared questionable to the Middle Ages, because it is bogged down in the literal meaning of the word and does not give any explanation of the meaning of the world or of life. The spiritual meaning of the word with its universe of signification, and its scope of signification, contains an interpretation of meaning that derives from the Christian spirit and is thus a guide to life...

== See also ==
- Etymologiae
- Cratylus
