= Commodian =

3rd century Christian poet and writer

Commodian (Commodianus) was a Christian Latin poet, who flourished about AD 250.

The only ancient writers who mention him are Gennadius, presbyter of Massilia (end of 5th century), in his De scriptoribus ecclesiasticis, and an author once thought to be Pope Gelasius in De libris recipiendis et non recipiendis, in which his works are classed as Apocryphi, probably on account of certain heterodox statements contained in them. Commodianus is supposed to have been from Roman Africa, partly on the ground of his similarity to Cyprian, partly because the African school was the chief center of Christian Latinity in the third century; a Syrian origin has also been suggested.

As he himself tells us, he was originally a pagan, but was converted to Christianity when advanced in years, and felt called upon to instruct the ignorant in the truth. He was the author of two extant works of poetry, Instructiones and Carmen apologeticum (first published in 1852 by J. B. Pitra in the Spicilegium Solesmense, from an MS. in the Middlehill collection, now at Cheltenham, supposed to have been brought from the monastery of Bobbio).

The Instructiones consist of 80 poems, each of which is an acrostic (with the exception of poem 60, where the initial letters are in alphabetical order). The initials of poem 80, read backwards, give Commodianus Mendicus Christi. The Carmen Apologeticum, undoubtedly by Commodianus, although the name of the author (as well as the title) is absent from the MS., is free from the acrostic restriction. The first part of the Instructiones is addressed to the heathens and Jews, and ridicules the divinities of classical mythology; the second contains reflections on Antichrist, the end of the world, the Resurrection, and advice to Christians, penitents, and the clergy. In the Apologeticum all mankind are exhorted to repent, in view of the approaching end of the world. The appearance of Antichrist, identified with Nero Redivivus and the Man from the East, is expected at an early date. Although they display fiery dogmatic zeal, the poems cannot be considered quite orthodox. To the classical scholar the metre alone is of interest. Although they are professedly written in hexameters, the rules of quantity are sacrificed to accent. The first four lines of the Instructiones may be quoted by way of illustration:

Praefatio nostra viam erranti demonstrat
Respectumque bonum, cum venerit saeculi meta
Aeternum fieri, quod discredunt inscia corda:
Ego similiter erravi tempore multo.

These versus politici (as they are called) show that the change was already passing over Latin which resulted in the formation of the Romance languages. The use of cases and genders, the construction of verb, and prepositions, and the verbal forms exhibit striking irregularities. The author, however, shows an acquaintance with Latin poets Horace, Virgil, and Lucretius.

Commodian wrote in Latin rhythmic hexameter.

== Editions ==
- Poinsotte, Jean-Michel (ed., trans.). Commodien. Instructions (Paris: Les Belles Lettres, 2009) (Collection des universités de France. Série latine, 392).
- The instructions of Commodianus, in favor of Christian discipline, against the gods of the heathens (1880). Transcribed by Robert Ernest Wallis (1820–1900). In Ante-Nicene Christian library, Volume XVIII.
- Ludwig, E. (1878). Commodiani Carmina, part 1: Instructiones. Leipzig.
- Ludwig, E. (1877). Commodiani Carmina part 2: Carmen Apologeticum. Leipzig.
