= Bern Riddles =

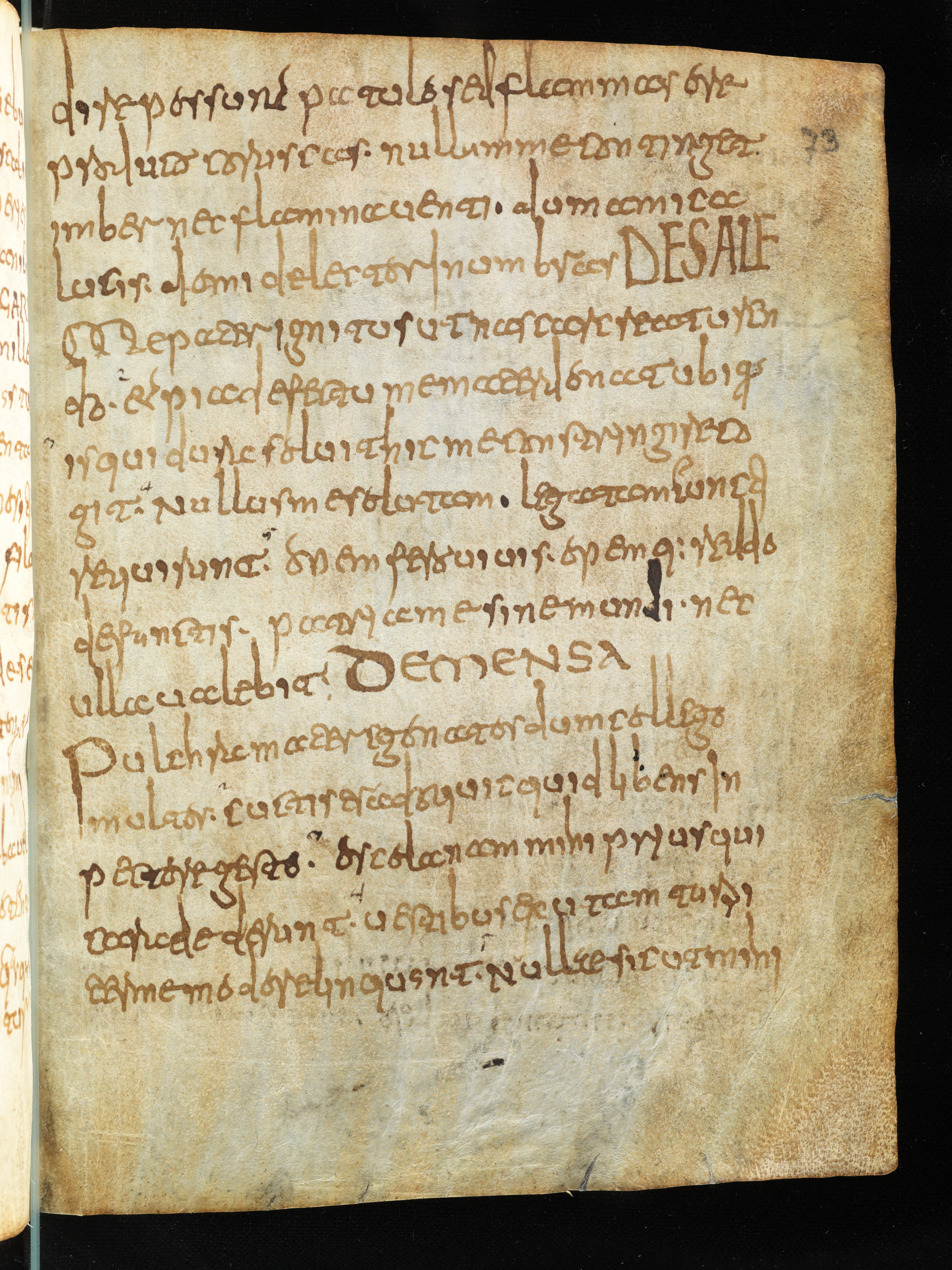
Bern, Burgerbibliothek, Cod. 611, f. 73v: two of the Bern Riddles (De sale, salt, and De mensa, table), from the manuscript that gives the collection its name.

The Bern Riddles, also known as Aenigmata Bernensia, Aenigmata Hexasticha or Riddles of Tullius, are a collection of 64 rhythmic Latin riddles, named after the location of their earliest surviving manuscript, which today is held in Bern (though probably produced in Bourges): the early eighth-century Codex Bernensis 611.

== Origin ==
Although it has been suggested that they were composed in late antiquity, most scholars consider that the Bern Riddles were inspired by the c. fourth-century collection of riddles attributed to Symphosius, and date to around 700 AD.

The author of the Bern Riddles is not known but the book might have been written by "a Lombard familiar with Mediterranean flora and food". According to Archer Taylor, "The Berne Riddles are especially interesting for the author's familiarity with the North Italian landscape and its plants. Whoever he was, we may safely call him the first medieval riddle-master in Italy". Some scholars have proposed that the Bern Riddles originated in early England, where several early medieval collections of verse riddles were created, including the Enigmata of Aldhelm. However, it is more probable that the Bern Riddles were written under the influence of Aldhelm's collection and therefore post-date it.

== Subjects ==
The subjects of the Bern Riddles are as follows:

- 1. de olla (pot)
- 2. de lucerna (lamp)
- 3. de sale (salt)
- 4. de scamno (stool)
- 5. de mensa (table)
- 6. de calice (glass beaker)
- 7. de uesica (bladder)
- 8. de ouo (egg)
- 9. de mola (millstone)
- 10. de scala (ladder)
- 11. de naue (ship)
- 12. de grano (grain of corn)
- 13. de uite (grapevine)
- 14. de oliua (olive)
- 15. de palma (palm-tree)
- 16. de cedria (juniper berry)
- 17. de cribro (sieve)
- 18. de scopa (broom)
- 19. de cera (beeswax)
- 20. de melle (honey)
- 21. de ape (bee)
- 22. de oue (sheep)
- 23. de igne (fire)
- 24. de membrana (parchment)
- 25. de litteris (letters)
- 26. de sinapi (mustard)
- 27. de papiro (papyrus)
- 28. de sirico (silk)
- 29. de speculo (mirror)
- 30. de pisce (fish)
- 31. de nympha (siphon)
- 32. de spongia (sponge)
- 33. de uiola (violet)
- 34. de rosa (rose)
- 35. de lilio (lily)
- 36. de croco (saffron)
- 37. de pipere (pepper)
- 38. de glacie (ice)
- 39. de hedera (ivy)
- 40. de muscipula (mousetrap)
- 41. de uento (wind)
- 42. de glacie (ice)
- 43. de vermicolis siricis formatis (silkworms)
- 44. de margarita (pearl)
- 45. de terra (earth)
- 46. de malleo (hammer)
- 47. de castanea (chestnut)
- 48. [de nuce] (walnut)
- 49. de pluuia (rain)
- 50. de uino (wine)
- 50a. [de membrana] (parchment)
- 51. de alio (garlic)
- 52. de rosa (rose)
- 53. [de pistillo] (pestle)
- 54. [de follibus] (bellows and purse)
- 55. de sole (sun)
- 56. de uerbo (word)
- 57. de sole (sun)
- 58. de luna (moon)
- 59. de luna (moon)
- 60. de caelo (sky)
- 61. de umbra (shadow)
- 62. de stellis (stars)
- 63. de uino (wine)

== Examples ==
LI. De alio.
Multiplici ueste natus de matre productor
Nec habere corpus possum, si uestem amitto.
Meos, unde nasco, in uentre fero parentes;
Viuo nam sepultus, uitam et inde resumo.
Superis eductus nec umquam crescere possum,
Dum natura caput facit succedere plantis.

Translation:

51. Garlic.
I am brought forth, born from my mother, with many-layered clothing;
I cannot have a body if I lose my clothing.
I carry my parents, from whom I am born, in my womb/stomach;
I live though interred, and from that place I resume my life.
I can never grow up, nurtured, to a great height,
since Nature makes my head go beneath my shoots/the soles of my feet.

LII. De rosa.
Mollis ego duro de corde genero natos;
In conceptu numquam amplexu uiri delector.
Sed dum infra meis concrescunt fili latebris,
Meum quisque nascens disrumpit uulnere corpus.
Postquam decorato uelantes tegmine matrem
Saepe delicati frangunt acumine fortes.

Translation:

52. Rose.
Soft as I am, I produce sons from my hard heart;
in conceiving I am never delighted by the embrace of a man.
But as my sons grow strong beneath my hiding-places,
each ruptures my body with a wound as it is born.
Thereafter, covering their mother with an ornate blanket,
the weak often break the strong with a sharp point.

The riddles are written in Latin rhythmic hexameter.

== Manuscripts ==
The Bern Riddles come down to us in the twelve medieval manuscripts, including:

Siglum	Name	Folios	Date	Number of Riddles	Comments
H	Cod. Bern 611	73-80v	8th c. (1st half)	33	See manuscript here. Parts of this manuscripts are missing.
I	Cod. Berlin Philipps 167	37v-45	ca. 800	61	
R	Cod. Leipzig Rep. I 74	15v-24	9th (middle)	63	See manuscript here.
W^{1}	Cod. Vienna 67	168v-170	12th c.	62	
W^{2}	Cod. Vienna 2285	206-12	14th c.	62	
Q	Cod. Paris Lat. 5596	165-	9th (early)	9	See manuscript here.
Q^{1}	Cod. Paris Lat. 8071	no foliation	9th c.	2	See manuscript here. Sometimes referred to as Codex Thuaneus.
U^{4}	Cod. Vatican Reg. Lat. 1553	8v-21 (passim)	9th c. (early)	52	See manuscript here. Mixed with riddles of Symphosius and Aldhelm.
A	Chicago, Newberry MS f.11		12th c. (first half)	62	

== Editions and translations ==
Key modern editions of the Bern Riddles include:

- 'Aenigmata in Dei nomine Tullii seu aenigmata quaestionum artis rhetoricae [aenigmata "bernensia"]', ed. by Fr. Glorie, trans. by Karl J. Minst, in Tatuini omnia opera, Variae collectiones aenigmatum merovingicae aetatis, Anonymus de dubiis nominibus, Corpus christianorum: series latina, 133-133a, 2 vols (Turnholt: Brepols, 1968), II 541–610.
- Strecker, Karl (ed). “Aenigmata Hexasticha.” MGH: Poetae Latini aevi Carolingi, Vol. 4.2; Berlin, 1914. pp. 732-759.
- The Bern Riddles, in The Riddle Ages: Old English Riddles, Translations and Commentaries, ed. by Megan Cavell and Neville Mogford, with Matthias Ammon and Victoria Symons (2013-). An edition and English translation of the Bern Riddles begun in 2020.
- Die Berner Rätsel / Aenigmata Bernensia: Lateinisch - deutsch, ed. and trans. by Dieter Bitterli (Berlin: De Gruyter, 2023), doi:10.1515/9783111337319
