= Anglo-Saxons =

Early medieval cultural group in Britain

Englisċ
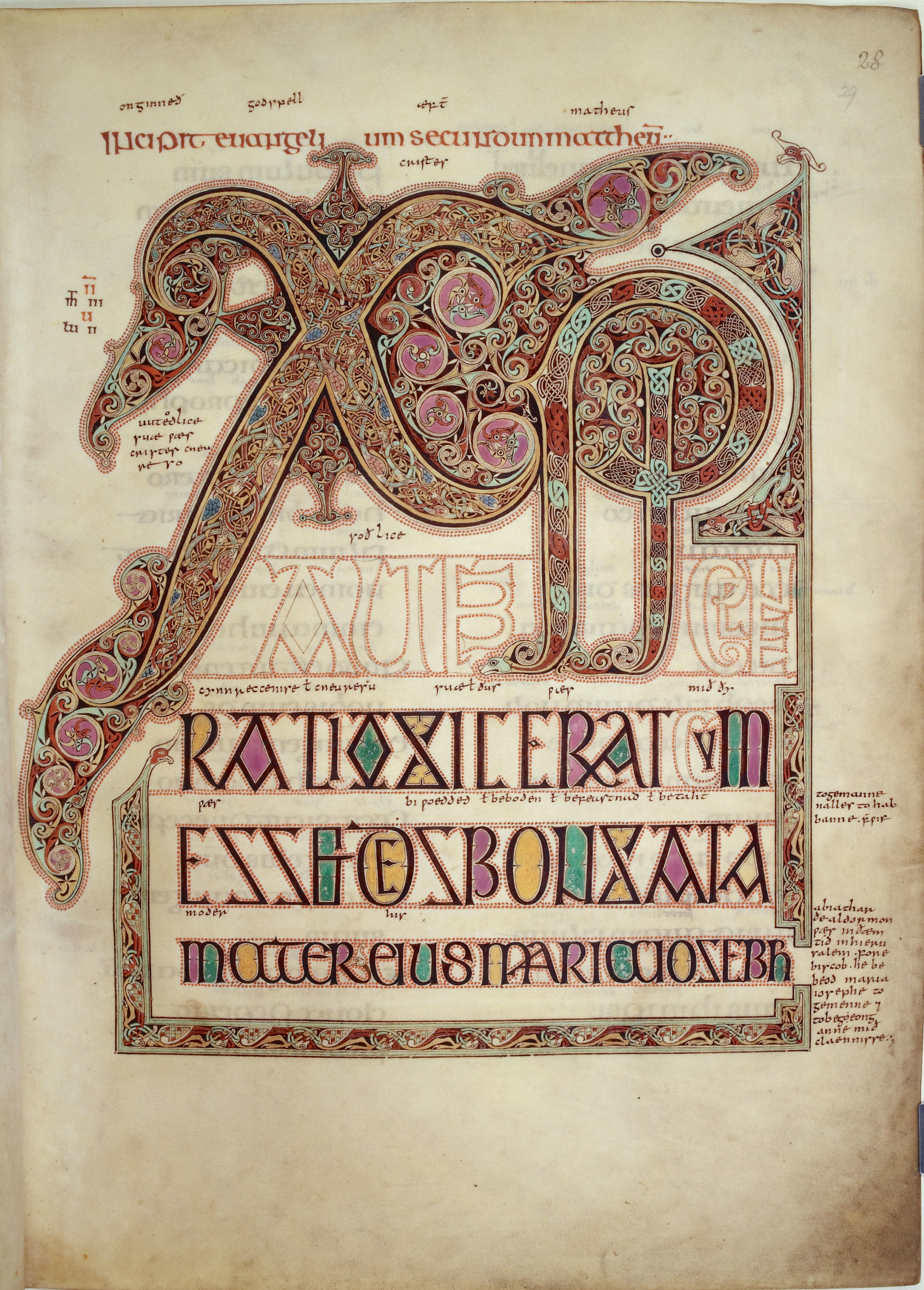
- Page with Chi Rho monogram from the Gospel of Matthew in the Lindisfarne Gospels c. 700, possibly created by Eadfrith of Lindisfarne in memory of Cuthbert

Languages
- Old English; Latin (ecclesiastical and literary use)

Religion
- Anglo-Saxon paganism, later Christianity

Related ethnic groups
- Angles, Saxons, Jutes, English people

The Anglo-Saxons, in some contexts simply called Saxons or the English, were a cultural group who spoke Old English and inhabited much of what is now England and south-eastern Scotland in the Early Middle Ages. They traced their origins to Germanic settlers who became one of the most important cultural groups in Britain by the 5th century. The Anglo-Saxon period in Britain is considered to have started by about 450 and ended in 1066, with the Norman Conquest. Although the details of their early settlement and political development are not clear, by the 8th century an Anglo-Saxon cultural identity which was generally called Englisc had developed out of the interaction of these settlers with the existing Romano-British culture. By 1066, most of the people of what is now England spoke Old English, and were considered English. Viking and Norman invasions changed the politics and culture of England significantly, but the overarching Anglo-Saxon identity evolved and remained dominant even after these major changes. Late Anglo-Saxon political structures and language are the direct predecessors of the high medieval Kingdom of England and the Middle English language. Although the modern English language owes less than 26% of its words to Old English, this includes the vast majority (over 80%) of everyday words.

In the early 8th century, the earliest detailed account of Anglo-Saxon origins was given by Bede (d. 735), suggesting that they were long divided into smaller regional kingdoms, each with differing accounts of their continental origins. As a collective term, the compound term Anglo-Saxon, commonly used by modern historians for the period before 1066, first appears in Bede's time, but it was probably not widely used until modern times. Bede was one of the first writers to prefer "Angles" (or English) as the collective term, and this eventually became dominant. Bede, like other authors, also continued to use the collective term "Saxons", especially when referring to the earliest periods of settlement. Roman and British writers of the 3rd to 6th century described those earliest Saxons as North Sea raiders, and mercenaries. Bede believed the earliest settlers were really from a range of different tribes in northern Europe, notably including the people of what he called "Old Saxony" in what is now northern Germany, the Jutes of what is now Jutland in western Denmark, and the English (Angles) themselves, whose homeland he placed between the former two.

Anglo-Saxon material culture can be seen in architecture, dress styles, illuminated texts, metalwork and other art. Behind the symbolic nature of these cultural emblems, there are strong elements of tribal and lordship ties. The elite declared themselves kings who developed burhs (fortifications and fortified settlements), and identified their roles and peoples in Biblical terms. Above all, as archaeologist Helena Hamerow has observed, "local and extended kin groups remained...the essential unit of production throughout the Anglo-Saxon period."

== Ethnonym ==
In modern times, the term "Anglo-Saxons" is used by scholars to refer collectively to the Old English speaking groups in Britain. As a compound term, it has the advantage of covering the various English-speaking groups on the one hand, and to avoid possible misunderstandings from using the terms "Saxons" or "Angles" (English), both of which terms could be used either as collectives referring to all the Old English speakers, or to specific tribal groups. Although the term "Anglo Saxon" was not used as a common term until modern times, it is not a modern invention because it was also used in some specific contexts already between the 8th and 10th centuries. Its first recorded use was by Continental scholars in the mid-eighth century.

Before the 8th century, the most common collective term for the Old-English speakers was "Saxons", a term originally associated since the 4th century not with a specific country or nation, but with raiders in North Sea coastal areas of Britain and Gaul. An early reference to the Angli is in the writing of 6th-century Byzantine historian Procopius, which he apparently heard through Frankish diplomats. He never mentions the Saxons, but he refers to a large island he called Brittia, which was not far from the Rhine delta. He had heard it was settled by three nations, the Angili, Frissones (Frisians), and Brittones, who were each ruled by their own king. Each nation was so prolific that Brittia sent large numbers of individuals every year to the Franks, who planted them in unpopulated regions of their territory.

By the 8th century the Frisians and Saxons living on the continent (both of whom Procopius never mentions) were seen as two distinct countries, and writers such as Bede and some of his contemporaries including Alcuin, and Saint Boniface, began to refer to the overall group in Britain as the "English" people (Latin Angli, gens Anglorum or Old English Angelcynn). In Bede's work the term "Saxon" is also used to refer sometimes to the Old English language, and also to refer to the early pagan Anglo-Saxons before the arrival of Christian missionaries among the Anglo-Saxons of Kent in 597. The term "Saxon", on the other hand, was at this time increasingly used by mainland writers to designate the northeastern neighbours of the Frankish kingdom of Austrasia. Bede therefore called these the "Old Saxons" (antiqui saxones), and he believed that there was no longer any country of Angles in Germany, as it had become empty due to emigration.

Similarly, a non-Anglo-Saxon contemporary of Bede, Paul the Deacon, referred variously to either the English (Angli), or Anglo-Saxons (Latin plural genitives Saxonum Anglorum, or Anglorum Saxonum), which helped him distinguish them from the European Saxons whom he also discussed. In England itself this compound term also came to be used in some specific situations, both in Latin and Old English. Alfred the Great, the king of the West Saxons, adopted the title Anglosaxonum Rex in the late 880s, indicating that he had been accepted as king by all English who were not under Viking rule. However, the term "English" continued to be used as a common collective term, and indeed became dominant. The increased use of these new collective terms, "English" or "Anglo-Saxon", represents the strengthening of the idea of a single unifying cultural unity among the Anglo-Saxons themselves, who had previously invested in identities which differentiated various regional groups.

In contrast, Irish and Welsh speakers long continued to refer to Anglo-Saxons as Saxons. The word Saeson is the modern Welsh word for "English people"; the equivalent word in Scottish Gaelic is Sasannach and in the Irish language, Sasanach. Catherine Hills suggests that it is no accident "that the English call themselves by the name sanctified by the Church, as that of a people chosen by God, whereas their enemies use the name originally applied to piratical raiders".

== History ==
=== Anglo-Saxon origins (4th–6th centuries) ===
The migrations according to Bede, who wrote some 300 years after the arrival of Anglo-Saxon fashions in Britain. Archaeological and genetic evidence confirms that settlers in England came from these areas

Although it involved immigrant communities from continental Europe, the culture of the Anglo-Saxons was not transplanted from there, but rather developed in Britain. In 400, the Roman province of Britannia had long been part of the Roman Empire. Although the empire had been dismembered several times during the previous centuries, often because of usurpations beginning in Britain (such as those of Magnus Maximus, and Constantine III), there was an overall continuity and interconnectedness with both Roman and Germanic regions on the continent. Already before 400, Roman sources used the term Saxons to refer to coastal raiders who had been causing problems especially on the coasts of the North Sea. In what is now south-eastern England the Romans established a military commander who was assigned to oversee a chain of coastal forts which they called the Saxon shore. The first third century raiders are not called Saxons in contemporary sources, but in the late fourth century the Roman historian Eutropius claimed that Saxon and Frankish raiders had been attacking the North Sea coast near Boulogne-sur-Mer in about 285, when the naval commander Carausius was given the mission to restore order. He later became a usurper, declaring himself Emperor, and a contemporary source, the "8th" Latin Panegyric of 297, refers to the rebellious barbarian forces of Carausius and Allectus based around London in the 290s as being mainly "Frankish". It also mentions local British people in this period who "imitated the barbarian in their mode of dress and flowing red hair". The homeland of these early raiders was also not clearly defined in such sources but they were apparently from regions near the Lower Rhine, where the Romans had also lost control to barbarians including Franks, Chamavi and Frisii. (This is considered by some Dutch historians to be the last recorded mention of the Frisii, whose country became depopulated in the 4th century.)

The imperial administration in Britain, as in other parts of the empire, began more heavily to recruit Germanic soldiers from the Rhine river regions and beyond in what is now Germany and the Netherlands, and these are likely to have become more important in Britain after the withdrawal of field armies during internal Roman power struggles. In the 360s and 370s there was a major invasion of Saxons into Britain, coordinated with tribes from Ireland and Scotland, and they were able to take control of large parts of the province. Roman officer Count Theodosius led a successful campaign to recover control, both in Britain, including a naval battle in the Orkneys, and possibly also in the Rhine delta. A few years later, in 383, the commander Magnus Maximus began his push for imperial power in Britain, and according to later writers such as Gildas he took the best Roman forces with him, leaving Britain exposed once again to the Irish and Scottish tribes. According to the Chronica Gallica of 452, Britain was ravaged by Saxon invaders in 409 or 410. This was only a few years after Constantine III was declared Roman emperor in Britain, and during the period that he was still leading British Roman forces in rebellion on the continent. The rebellion was soon quashed, the Romano-British citizens reportedly expelled Constantine's imperial officials during this period, but they never again received new Roman officials or military forces. Writing in the mid-sixth century, the Byzantine historian Procopius states that after the death of Constantine III in 411, "the Romans never succeeded in recovering Britain, but it remained from that time under tyrants."

The Romano-Britons nevertheless called upon the empire to help them fend off attacks from not only the Saxons, but also the Picts and Scoti. A hagiography of Saint Germanus of Auxerre claims that he helped command a defence against an invasion of Picts and Saxons in 429. By about 430 the archaeological record in Britain begins to indicate a relatively rapid melt-down of Roman material culture, and its replacement by Anglo-Saxon material culture. At some time between 445 and 454 Gildas, one of the only writers in this period, reported that the Britons also wrote to the Roman military leader Aëtius in Gaul, begging for assistance, with no success. In desperation, an unnamed "proud tyrant" at some point invited Saxons as foederati soldiers to Britain to help defend it from the Picts and Scots. Gildas did not report the year, and later writers (and modern historians) developed different estimates of when this occurred. Possibly referring to this same event, the Chronica Gallica of 452 records for the year 441: "The British provinces, which to this time had suffered various defeats and misfortunes, are reduced to Saxon rule". Bede, writing centuries later, reasoned that this happened in 450–455, and he named the "proud tyrant" as Vortigern. However, the date could have been significantly earlier, and Bede's understanding of these events has been questioned. The Historia Brittonum, written in the 9th century, gives two different years, but the writer apparently believed it happened in 428. Another 9th-century source, the Anglo-Saxon Chronicle, is largely based on Bede but says this Saxon arrival happened in 449. The archaeological evidence suggests an earlier timescale. In particular, the work of Catherine Hills and Sam Lucy on the evidence of Spong Hill has moved the chronology for the settlement earlier than 450, with a significant number of items now in phases before Bede's date. Historian Guy Halsall has even speculated that Gildas was badly misread by Bede and all subsequent historians, and that the invitation of the foederati was part of a military reorganization in the time of Magnus Maximus in the late 4th century.

Bede, whose report of this period is partly based on Gildas, believed that the call was answered by kings from three powerful tribes from Germania, Angles, Saxons, and Jutes. The Saxons came from Old Saxony on the North Sea coast of Germany, and settled in Wessex, Sussex and Essex. Jutland, the peninsula containing part of Denmark, was the homeland of the Jutes who settled in Kent and the Isle of Wight. The Angles (or English) were from 'Anglia', a country which Bede understood to have now been emptied, and which lay between the homelands of the Saxons and Jutes. Anglia is usually interpreted as the old Schleswig-Holstein Province (straddling the modern Danish-German border), and containing the modern Angeln. Although this represents a turning point, the continental ancestors of the Anglo-Saxons were probably quite diverse, and they arrived over a longer period. In another passage, Bede named pagan peoples still living in Germania in the eighth century "from whom the Angles or Saxons, who now inhabit Britain, are known to have derived their origin; for which reason they are still corruptly called Garmans by the neighbouring nation of the Britons": the Frisians, the Rugini, the Danes, the "Huns" (Avars in this period), the "old Saxons", and the "Boructuari", who are presumed to be inhabitants of the old lands of the Bructeri, near the Lippe river.

The approximate extent of Anglo-Saxon expansion into the former Roman province of Britannia, by c.600

Gildas reported that a war broke out between the Saxons and the local population, who joined forces under a person named Ambrosius Aurelianus. Historian Nick Higham calls it the "War of the Saxon Federates". Unlike Bede and later writers who followed him, for whom this war turned into a very long war between two nations which was eventually won by the descendants of the Saxons, Gildas reported that by the time he was born this war ended successfully for the Britons after the siege at 'Mons Badonicus'. Higham argues, however, that the war must have resulted in a treaty favorable to the Saxons, giving them the ability to receive tribute from people across the lowlands of Britain. Gildas himself did not mention the defeated Saxons as an ongoing problem, but instead he noted that the Britons had become divided into many small "tyrannies". His interest was in criticizing the Romano-British ruling class, whereas archaeological evidence shows that Anglo-Saxon culture had long become dominant over much of Britain. Historians who accept Bede's understanding interpret Gildas as ignoring a large part of Britain, and writing about Romano-British kingdoms which had been limited to the north and west. Other historians have argued that in the 5th century many Romano-British people must have adopted the new culture which we now call Anglo-Saxon, even when they did not have Germanic ancestry or rulers.

There are very few written sources apart from Gildas until the conversion of the Anglo-Saxons to Christianity which began in the late 6th century. One eastern contemporary of Gildas, Procopius, reported a story which was apparently relayed to him by Frankish diplomats, that an island called Brittia which faced the Rhine was divided between three peoples, the Britons, Anglii, and Frisians. Bede and later sources portrayed the royal family of Kent as a direct descendants of the original group of "Saxons" mentioned by Gildas, although they apparently believed they were actually Jutish. However, the king lists and genealogies produced by Bede and later writers are not considered reliable for these early centuries.

A 2022 genetic study used modern and ancient DNA samples from England and neighbouring countries to study the question of physical Anglo-Saxon migration and concluded that there was large-scale immigration of both men and women into Eastern England, from a "north continental" population matching early medieval people from the area stretching from northern Netherlands through northern Germany to Denmark. This began already in the Roman era, and then increased rapidly in the 5th century. The burial evidence showed that the locals and immigrants were being buried together using the same new customs, and that they were having mixed children. The authors estimate that actual contributions to the modern English gene pool are between 25% and 47% of "northern continental" origin, between 11% and 57% from Iron Age British ancestry, and between 14% and 43% attributable to a more extensive migration into southern England from the Frankish areas of Europe during the Early Middle Ages. There were significant regional variations in north continental ancestry ― lower in the west, and highest in Sussex, the East Midlands and East Anglia.

Linguistic evidence from the names of kings in Anglo-Saxon royal genealogies suggests that Britons played a part in the foundation of several Anglo-Saxon kingdoms. In the kingdom of Wessex, early kings Cerdic, Cædwalla and probably Ceawlin bear British names. In Mercia, Penda, Pybba and Creoda, members of the royal family in the 6th and early 7th century, appear to have names derived from Old Welsh. A royal genealogy from the minor kingdom of Lindsey gives the name Cædbæd, probably derived from British *Catuboduos, for one of its early sixth-century kings.

=== Christianity and the early kingdoms ===
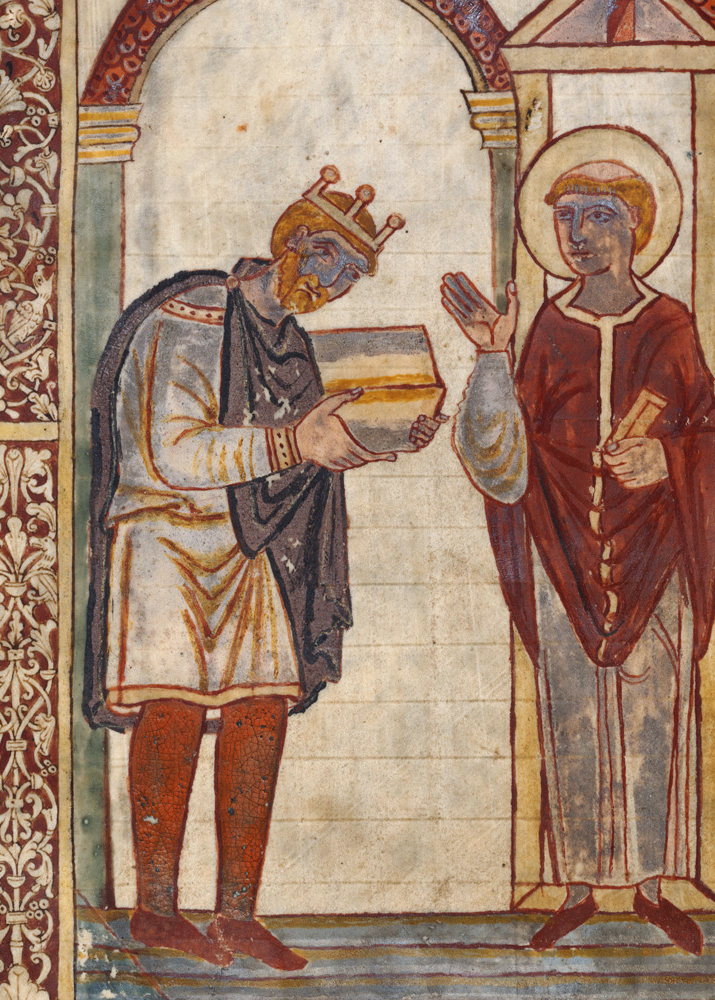
King Æthelstan presenting a gospel book to (the long-dead) St Cuthbert (934); Corpus Christi College, Cambridge MS 183, fol. 1v

From the time of the Christian conversions the first well-attested English kings and kingdoms appear in the written record. This situation, with a small number of kingdoms competing for dominance, is traditionally called the Heptarchy, which indicates a period of seven kingdoms. There were however more than seven kingdoms, and their interactions were quite complex.

In 595, the missionary Augustine landed on the Isle of Thanet and proceeded to King Æthelberht's main town of Canterbury. He had been sent by Pope Gregory the Great to lead the Gregorian mission to Britain to Christianise the Kingdom of Kent from their native Anglo-Saxon paganism. Kent was probably chosen because Æthelberht had married a Christian princess, Bertha, daughter of Charibert I, the king of Paris, who was expected to exert some influence over her husband.

Æthelberht in Kent was later seen by Bede as the third king to have imperium over the English south of the Humber, having replaced Ceawlin of Wessex (died about 593), and before this generation there are only semi-mythical accounts of earlier kings. Æthelberht's law for Kent, the earliest written code in any Germanic language, instituted a complex system of fines. Kent was rich, with strong trade ties to the continent, and Æthelberht may have instituted royal control over trade. For the first time following the Anglo-Saxon invasion, coins began circulating in Kent during his reign. His son-in-law Sæberht of Essex also converted to Christianity.

After Æthelberht's death in about 616-618, the most powerful king was Rædwald of East Anglia, who also gave Christianity a foothold in his kingdom, and helped to install Edwin of Northumbria, who replaced Æthelfrith to become the second king over the two kingdoms north of the Humber, Bernicia and Deira. After Rædwald died, Cadwallon ap Cadfan, the king of Gwynedd, in alliance with king Penda of Mercia, killed Edwin in battle at Hatfield Chase. Æthelfrith's son Oswald subsequently became the third king of Northumbria. Although not included in Bede's list of rulers with imperium, Penda defeated and killed Oswald in 642 and was the dominant king of the English until he was himself killed in battle against Oswald's brother Oswiu in 655. Oswiu remained the dominant king of England until he died in 670.

In 635, Aidan, an Irish monk from Iona, chose the Isle of Lindisfarne to establish a monastery which was close to King Oswald's main fortress of Bamburgh. He had been at the monastery in Iona when Oswald asked to be sent a mission to Christianise the Kingdom of Northumbria from their native Anglo-Saxon paganism. Oswald had probably chosen Iona because after his father had been killed he had fled into south-west Scotland and had encountered Christianity, and had returned determined to make Northumbria Christian. Aidan achieved great success in spreading the Christian faith in the north, and since Aidan could not speak English and Oswald had learned Irish during his exile, Oswald acted as Aidan's interpreter when the latter was preaching. Later, Northumberland's patron saint, Saint Cuthbert, was an abbot of the monastery, and then Bishop of Lindisfarne. An anonymous life of Cuthbert written at Lindisfarne is the oldest extant piece of English historical writing, (Note: From its reference to "Aldfrith, who now reigns peacefully" it must date to between 685 and 704.) and in his memory a gospel (known as the St Cuthbert Gospel) was placed in his coffin. The decorated leather bookbinding is the oldest intact European binding.

In 664, the Synod of Whitby was convened and established Roman practice as opposed to Irish practice (in style of tonsure and dates of Easter) as the norm in Northumbria, and thus "brought the Northumbrian church into the mainstream of Roman culture." The episcopal seat of Northumbria was transferred from Lindisfarne to York. Wilfrid, chief advocate for the Roman position, later became Bishop of Northumbria, while Colmán and the Ionan supporters, who did not change their practices, withdrew to Iona. Wilfred also influenced kings to the south who were under the dominance of Oswiu, such as the son of Penda, Wulfhere of Mercia (died 675), who converted to Christianity and eventually recovered control over Mercia, and eventually expanded his dominance over most of England, beginning a long period of Mercian supremacy.

=== Middle Anglo-Saxon history (660–899) ===
By 660, the political map of Lowland Britain had developed with smaller territories coalescing into kingdoms, and from this time larger kingdoms started dominating the smaller kingdoms. The development of kingdoms, with a particular king being recognised as an overlord, developed out of an early loose structure that, Higham believes, is linked back to the original feodus. The traditional name for this period is the Heptarchy, which has not been used by scholars since the early 20th century as it gives the impression of a single political structure and does not afford the "opportunity to treat the history of any one kingdom as a whole". Simon Keynes suggests that the 8th and 9th century was a period of economic and social flourishing which created stability both below the Thames and above the Humber.

==== Mercian supremacy (626–821) ====
A political map of Britain circa 650 (the names are in modern English)

Middle-lowland Britain was known as the place of the Mierce, the border or frontier folk, or Mercia in Latin. Mercia was a diverse area of tribal groups, as shown by the Tribal Hidage; the peoples were a mixture of Brittonic speaking peoples and "Anglo-Saxon" pioneers and their early leaders had Brittonic names, such as Penda. Although Penda does not appear in Bede's list of great overlords, it would appear from what Bede says elsewhere that he was dominant over the southern kingdoms. At the time of the battle of the river Winwæd (655) against the kingdom of Bernicia, thirty duces regii (royal generals) fought on his behalf. Although there are many gaps in the evidence, it is clear that the seventh-century Mercian kings were formidable rulers who were able to exercise a wide-ranging overlordship from their Midland base.

Mercian military success was the basis of their power; it succeeded against not only 106 kings and kingdoms by winning set-piece battles, but by ruthlessly ravaging any area which withheld tribute. There are a number of casual references scattered throughout the Bede's history to this aspect of Mercian military policy. Penda is found ravaging Northumbria as far north as Bamburgh and only a miraculous intervention from Aidan prevents the complete destruction of the settlement. In 676 Æthelred conducted a similar ravaging in Kent and caused such damage in the Rochester diocese that two successive bishops gave up their position because of lack of funds. In these accounts there is a rare glimpse of the realities of early Anglo-Saxon overlordship and how a widespread overlordship could be established in a relatively short period. By the middle of the 8th century, other kingdoms of southern Britain were also affected by Mercian expansionism. The East Saxons seem to have lost control of London, Middlesex and Hertfordshire to Æthelbald, although the East Saxon homelands do not seem to have been affected, and the East Saxon dynasty continued into the ninth century. The Mercian influence and reputation reached its peak when, in the late 8th century, the most powerful European ruler of the age, the Frankish king Charlemagne, recognised the Mercian King Offa's power and accordingly treated him with respect, even if this could have been just flattery.

==== Learning and monasticism (660–793) ====
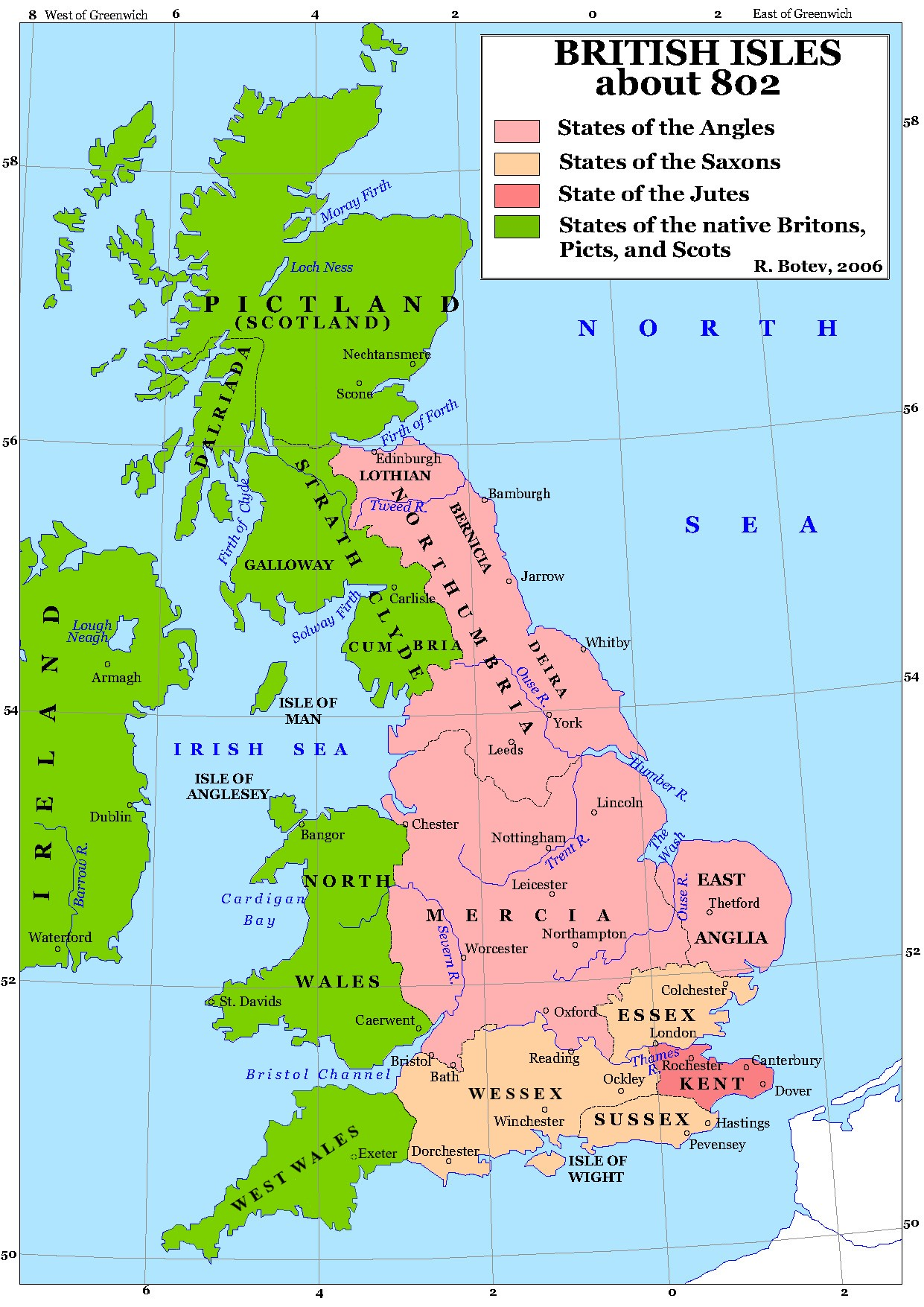
Map of Britain in 802. By this date, historians today rarely distinguish between Angles, Saxons and Jutes.

Michael Drout calls this period the "Golden Age", when learning flourished with a renaissance in classical knowledge. The growth and popularity of monasticism was not an entirely internal development, with influence from the continent shaping Anglo-Saxon monastic life. In 669 Theodore, a Greek-speaking monk originally from Tarsus in Asia Minor, arrived in Britain to become the eighth Archbishop of Canterbury. He was joined the following year by his colleague Hadrian, a Latin-speaking African by origin and former abbot of a monastery in Campania (near Naples). One of their first tasks at Canterbury was the establishment of a school; and according to Bede (writing some sixty years later), they soon "attracted a crowd of students into whose minds they daily poured the streams of wholesome learning". As evidence of their teaching, Bede reports that some of their students, who survived to his own day, were as fluent in Greek and Latin as in their native language. Bede does not mention Aldhelm in this connection; but it is known from a letter addressed by Aldhelm to Hadrian that he too must be numbered among their students.

Aldhelm wrote in elaborate and grandiloquent Latin, which became the dominant style for centuries. Michael Drout states "Aldhelm wrote Latin hexameters better than anyone before in England (and possibly better than anyone since, or at least up until John Milton). His work showed that scholars in England, at the very edge of Europe, could be as learned and sophisticated as any writers in Europe." During this period, the wealth and power of the monasteries increased as elite families, possibly out of power, turned to monastic life.

Anglo-Saxon monasticism developed the unusual institution of the "double monastery": a house of monks and a house of nuns, living next to each other, sharing a church but never mixing, and living separate lives of celibacy. These double monasteries were presided over by abbesses, who became some of the most powerful and influential women in Europe. Double monasteries which were built on strategic sites near rivers and coasts, accumulated immense wealth and power over multiple generations (their inheritances were not divided) and became centers of art and learning.

While Aldhelm was doing his work in Malmesbury, far from him, up in the North of England, Bede was writing a large quantity of books, gaining a reputation in Europe and showing that the English could write history and theology, and do astronomical computation (for the dates of Easter, among other things).

==== West Saxon hegemony and the Anglo-Scandinavian Wars (793–878) ====
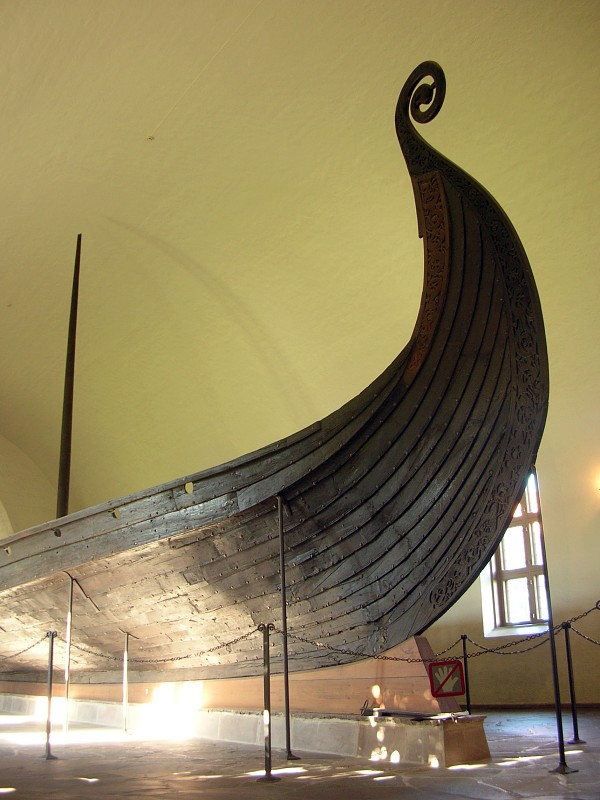
The Oseberg ship prow, Viking Ship Museum, Oslo, Norway.

During the 9th century, Wessex rose in power, from the foundations laid by King Egbert in the first quarter of the century to the achievements of King Alfred the Great in its closing decades. The outlines of the story are told in the Anglo-Saxon Chronicle, though the annals represent a West Saxon point of view. On the day of Egbert's succession to the kingdom of Wessex, in 802, a Mercian ealdorman from the province of the Hwicce had crossed the border at Kempsford, with the intention of mounting a raid into northern Wiltshire; the Mercian force was met by the local ealdorman, "and the people of Wiltshire had the victory". In 829, Egbert went on, the chronicler reports, to conquer "the kingdom of the Mercians and everything south of the Humber". It was at this point that the chronicler chooses to attach Egbert's name to Bede's list of seven overlords, adding that "he was the eighth king who was Bretwalda". Simon Keynes suggests Egbert's foundation of a 'bipartite' kingdom is crucial as it stretched across southern England, and it created a working alliance between the West Saxon dynasty and the rulers of the Mercians. In 860, the eastern and western parts of the southern kingdom were united by agreement between the surviving sons of King Æthelwulf, though the union was not maintained without some opposition from within the dynasty; and in the late 870s King Alfred gained the submission of the Mercians under their ruler Æthelred, who in other circumstances might have been styled a king, but who under the Alfredian regime was regarded as the 'ealdorman' of his people.

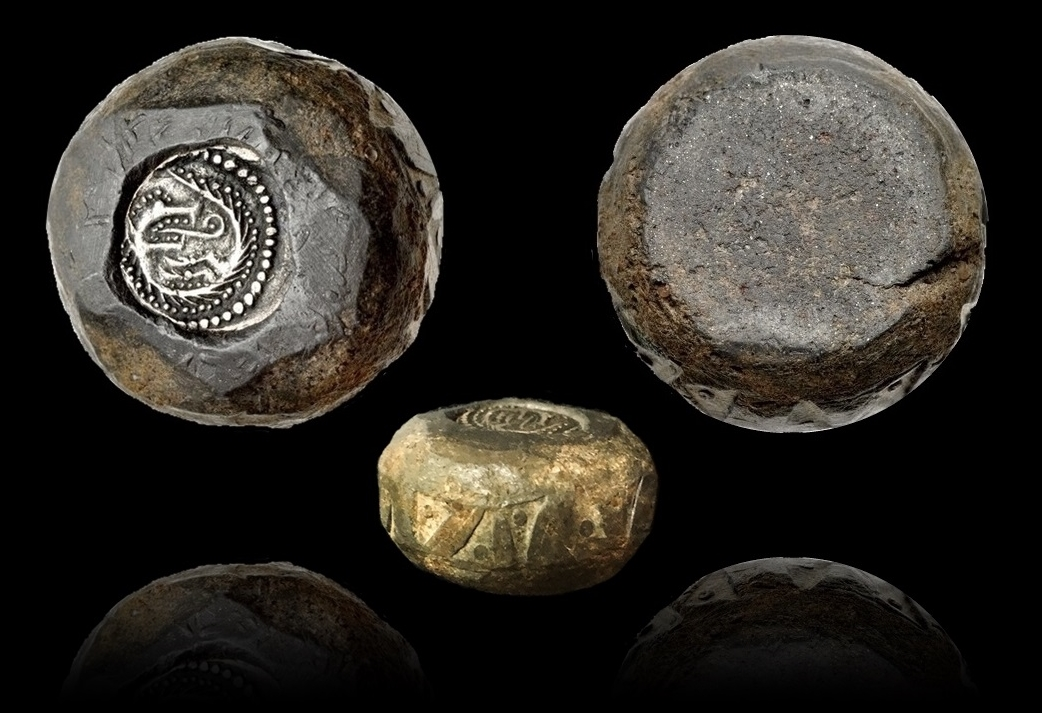
Anglo-Saxon-Viking coin weight. Material is lead and weighs approx 36 g. Embedded with a sceat dating to 720–750 AD and minted in Kent. It is edged with a dotted triangle pattern. Origin is the northern Danelaw region, and it dates from the late 8th to 9th century.

The wealth of the monasteries and the success of Anglo-Saxon society attracted the attention of people from mainland Northern Europe, mostly Danes and Norwegians. Because of the plundering raids that followed, the raiders attracted the name Viking – from the Old Norse víkingr meaning an expedition – which soon became used for the raiding activity or piracy reported in western Europe. In 793, Lindisfarne was raided and while this was not the first raid of its type it was the most prominent. In 794, Jarrow, the monastery where Bede wrote, was attacked; in 795 Iona in Scotland was attacked; and in 804 the nunnery at Lyminge in Kent was granted refuge inside the walls of Canterbury. Sometime around 800, a Reeve from Portland in Wessex was killed when he mistook some raiders for ordinary traders.

Viking raids continued until in 850, then the Chronicle says: "The heathen for the first time remained over the winter". The fleet does not appear to have stayed long in England, but it started a trend which others subsequently followed. In particular, the army which arrived in 865 remained over many winters, and part of it later settled what became known as the Danelaw. This was the "Great Army", a term used by the Chronicle in England and by Adrevald of Fleury on the Continent. The invaders were able to exploit the feuds between and within the various kingdoms and to appoint puppet kings, such as Ceolwulf in Mercia in 873 and perhaps others in Northumbria in 867 and East Anglia in 870. The third phase was an era of settlement; however, the "Great Army" went wherever it could find the richest pickings, crossing the English Channel when faced with resolute opposition, as in England in 878, or with famine, as on the Continent in 892. By this stage, the Vikings were assuming ever increasing importance as catalysts of social and political change. They constituted the common enemy, making the English more conscious of a national identity which overrode deeper distinctions; they could be perceived as an instrument of divine punishment for the people's sins, raising awareness of a collective Christian identity; and by 'conquering' the kingdoms of the East Angles, the Northumbrians and the Mercians, they created a vacuum in the leadership of the English people.

Danish settlement continued in Mercia in 877 and East Anglia in 879–80 and 896. The rest of the army meanwhile continued to harry and plunder on both sides of the Channel, with new recruits evidently arriving to swell its ranks, for it clearly continued to be a formidable fighting force. At first, Alfred responded by the offer of repeated tribute payments. However, after a decisive victory at Edington in 878, Alfred offered vigorous opposition. He established a chain of fortresses across the south of England, reorganised the army, "so that always half its men were at home, and half out on service, except for those men who were to garrison the burhs", and in 896 ordered a new type of craft to be built which could oppose the Viking longships in shallow coastal waters. When the Vikings returned from the Continent in 892, they found they could no longer roam the country at will, for wherever they went they were opposed by a local army. After four years, the Scandinavians therefore split up, some to settle in Northumbria and East Anglia, the remainder to try their luck again on the Continent.

==== King Alfred and the rebuilding (878–899) ====
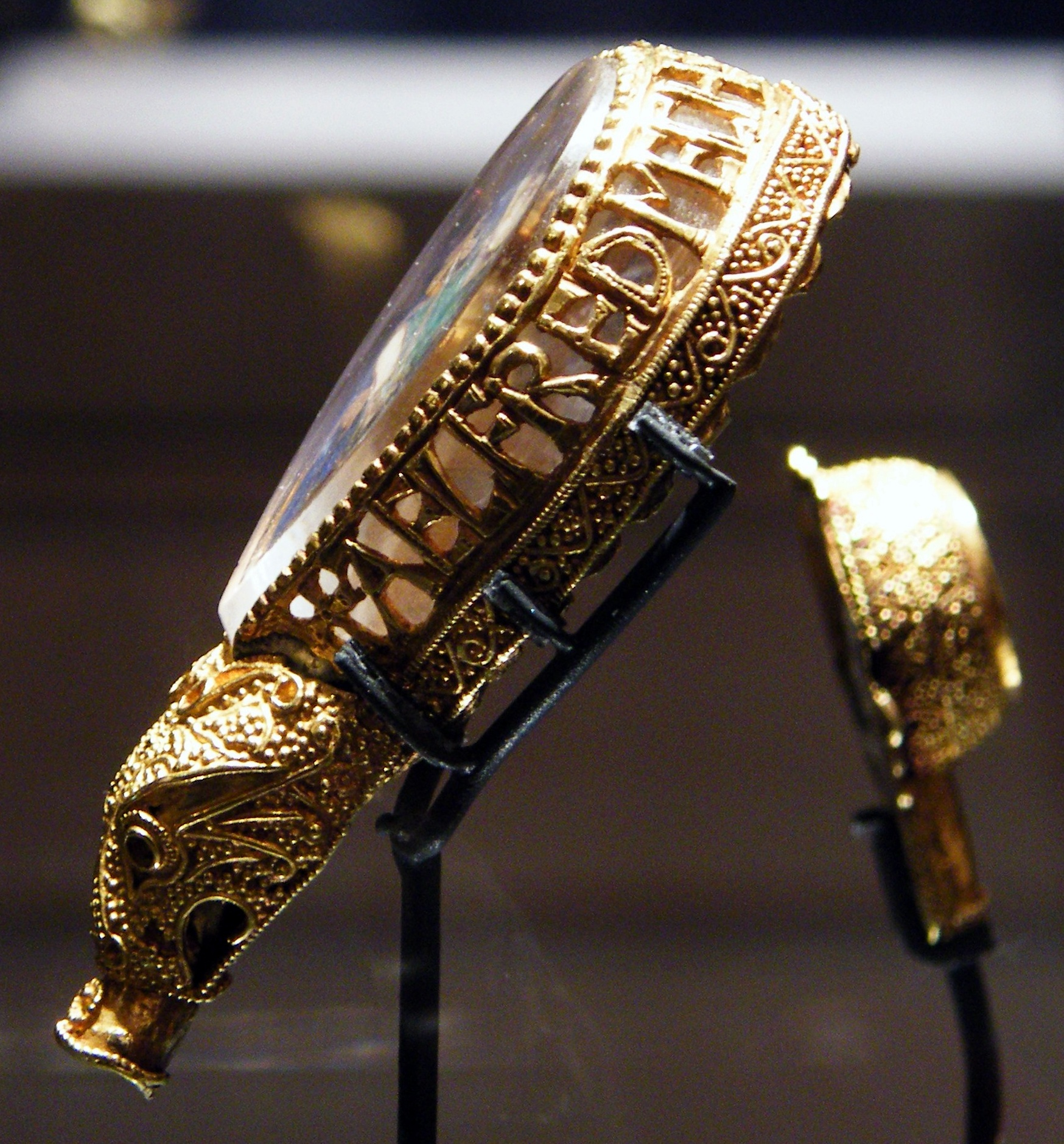
A royal gift, the Alfred Jewel

More important to Alfred than his military and political victories were his religion, his love of learning, and his spread of writing throughout England. Keynes suggests Alfred's work laid the foundations for what really made England unique in all of medieval Europe from around 800 until 1066.

Thinking about how learning and culture had fallen since the last century, King Alfred wrote:

...So completely had wisdom fallen off in England that there were very few on this side of the Humber who could understand their rituals in English, or indeed could translate a letter from Latin into English; and I believe that there were not many beyond the Humber. There were so few of them that I indeed cannot think of a single one south of the Thames when I became king. (Preface: "Gregory the Great's Pastoral Care")

Alfred knew that literature and learning, both in English and in Latin, were very important, but the state of learning was not good when Alfred came to the throne. Alfred saw kingship as a priestly office, a shepherd for his people. One book that was particularly valuable to him was Gregory the Great's Cura Pastoralis (Pastoral Care). This is a priest's guide on how to care for people. Alfred took this book as his own guide on how to be a good king to his people; hence, a good king to Alfred increases literacy. Alfred translated this book himself and explains in the preface:

...When I had learned it I translated it into English, just as I had understood it, and as I could most meaningfully render it. And I will send one to each bishopric in my kingdom, and in each will be an æstel worth fifty mancuses. And I command in God's name that no man may take the æstel from the book nor the book from the church. It is unknown how long there may be such learned bishops as, thanks to God, are nearly everywhere. (Preface: "Gregory the Great's Pastoral Care")

What is presumed to be one of these "æstel" (the word only appears in this one text) is the gold, rock crystal and enamel Alfred Jewel, discovered in 1693, which is assumed to have been fitted with a small rod and used as a pointer when reading. Alfred provided functional patronage, linked to a social programme of vernacular literacy in England, which was unprecedented.

Therefore it seems better to me, if it seems so to you, that we also translate certain books ...and bring it about ...if we have the peace, that all the youth of free men who now are in England, those who have the means that they may apply themselves to it, be set to learning, while they may not be set to any other use, until the time when they can well read English writings. (Preface: "Gregory the Great's Pastoral Care")

This began a growth in charters, law, theology and learning. Alfred thus laid the foundation for the great accomplishments of the tenth century and did much to make the vernacular more important than Latin in Anglo-Saxon culture.

I desired to live worthily as long as I lived, and to leave after my life, to the men who should come after me, the memory of me in good works. (Preface: "The Consolation of Philosophy by Boethius")

=== Late Anglo-Saxon history (899–1066) ===
A framework for the momentous events of the 10th and 11th centuries is provided by the Anglo-Saxon Chronicle. However charters, law-codes and coins supply detailed information on various aspects of royal government, and the surviving works of Anglo-Latin and vernacular literature, as well as the numerous manuscripts written in the 10th century, testify in their different ways to the vitality of ecclesiastical culture. Yet as Keynes suggests "it does not follow that the 10th century is better understood than more sparsely documented periods".

==== Reform and formation of England (899–978) ====
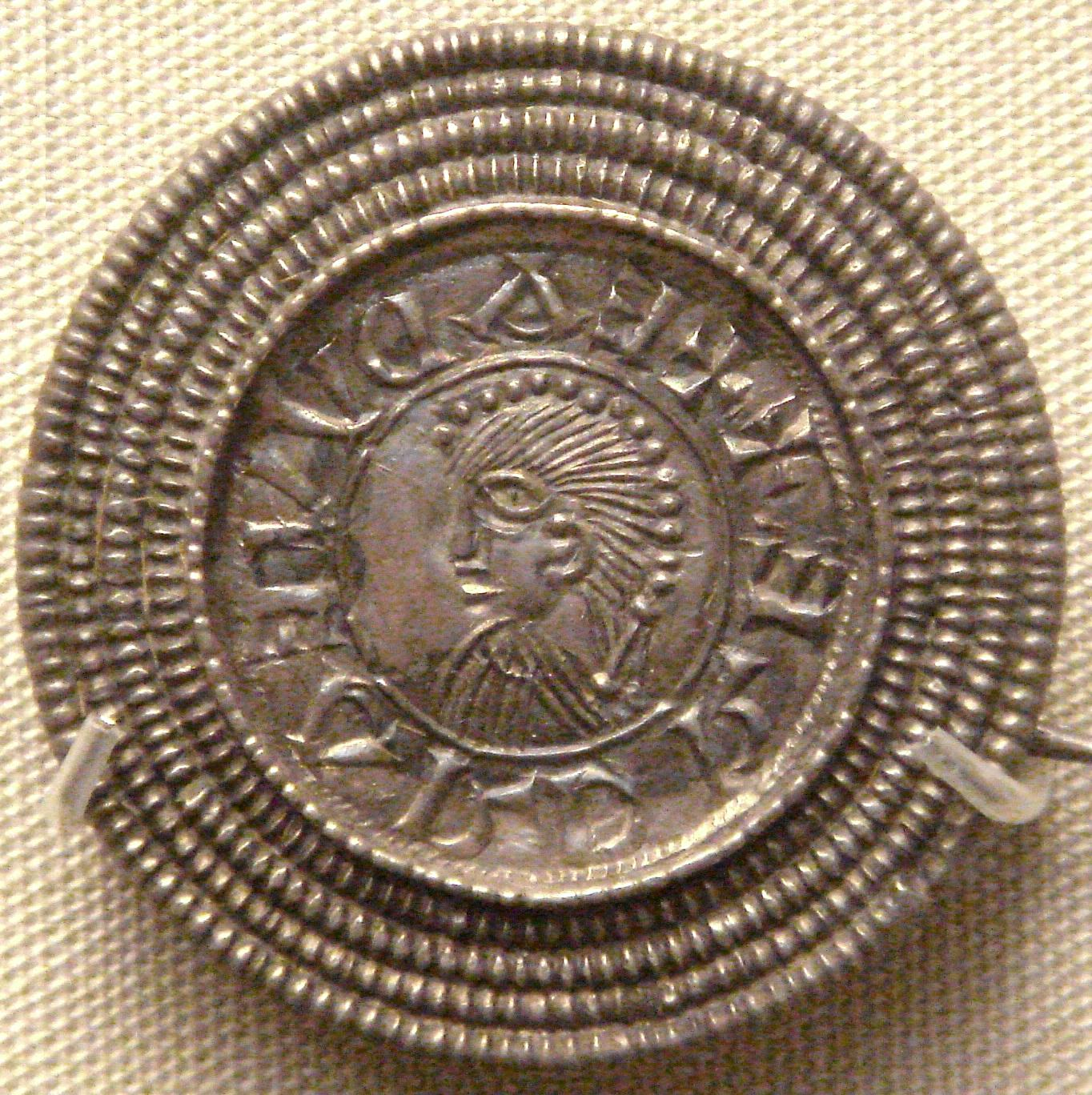
Silver brooch imitating a coin of Edward the Elder, c. 920, found in Rome, Italy. British Museum.

During the course of the 10th century, the West Saxon kings extended their power first over Mercia, then into the southern Danelaw, and finally over Northumbria, thereby imposing a semblance of political unity on peoples, who nonetheless would remain conscious of their respective customs and their separate pasts. The prestige, and indeed the pretensions, of the monarchy increased, the institutions of government strengthened, and kings and their agents sought in various ways to establish social order. This process started with Edward the Elder – who with his sister, Æthelflæd, Lady of the Mercians, initially, charters reveal, encouraged people to purchase estates from the Danes, thereby to reassert some degree of English influence in territory which had fallen under Danish control. David Dumville suggests that Edward may have extended this policy by rewarding his supporters with grants of land in the territories newly conquered from the Danes and that any charters issued in respect of such grants have not survived. When Athelflæd died, Mercia was absorbed by Wessex. From that point on there was no contest for the throne, so the house of Wessex became the ruling house of England.

Edward the Elder was succeeded by his son Æthelstan, whom Keynes calls the "towering figure in the landscape of the tenth century". His victory over a coalition of his enemies – Constantine, King of the Scots; Owain ap Dyfnwal, King of the Cumbrians; and Olaf Guthfrithson, King of Dublin – at the battle of Brunanburh, celebrated by a poem in the Anglo-Saxon Chronicle, opened the way for him to be hailed as the first king of England. Æthelstan's legislation shows how the king drove his officials to do their respective duties. He was uncompromising in his insistence on respect for the law. However this legislation also reveals the persistent difficulties which confronted the king and his councillors in bringing a troublesome people under some form of control. His claim to be "king of the English" was by no means widely recognised. The situation was complex: the Hiberno-Norse rulers of Dublin still coveted their interests in the Danish kingdom of York; terms had to be made with the Scots, who had the capacity not merely to interfere in Northumbrian affairs, but also to block a line of communication between Dublin and York; and the inhabitants of northern Northumbria were considered a law unto themselves. It was only after twenty years of crucial developments following Æthelstan's death in 939 that a unified kingdom of England began to assume its familiar shape. However, the major political problem for Edmund and Eadred, who succeeded Æthelstan, remained the difficulty of subjugating the north. In 959 Edgar is said to have "succeeded to the kingdom both in Wessex and in Mercia and in Northumbria, and he was then 16 years old" (ASC, version 'B', 'C'), and is called "the Peacemaker". By the early 970s, after a decade of Edgar's 'peace', it may have seemed that the kingdom of England was indeed made whole. In his formal address to the gathering at Winchester the king urged his bishops, abbots and abbesses "to be of one mind as regards monastic usage . . . lest differing ways of observing the customs of one Rule and one country should bring their holy conversation into disrepute".

Athelstan's court had been an intellectual incubator. In that court were two young men named Dunstan and Æthelwold who were made priests, supposedly at the insistence of Athelstan, right at the end of his reign in 939. Between 970 and 973 a council was held, under the aegis of Edgar, where a set of rules was devised that would be applicable throughout England. This put all the monks and nuns in England under one set of detailed customs for the first time. In 973, Edgar received a special second, 'imperial coronation' at Bath, and from this point England was ruled by Edgar under the strong influence of Dunstan, Athelwold, and Oswald, the Bishop of Worcester.

==== Æthelred and the return of the Scandinavians (978–1016) ====
The reign of King Æthelred the Unready witnessed the resumption of Viking raids on England, putting the country and its leadership under strains as severe as they were long sustained. Raids began on a relatively small scale in the 980s but became far more serious in the 990s, and brought the people to their knees in 1009–12, when a large part of the country was devastated by the army of Thorkell the Tall. It remained for Swein Forkbeard, king of Denmark, to conquer the kingdom of England in 1013–14, and (after Æthelred's restoration) for his son Cnut to achieve the same in 1015–16. The tale of these years incorporated in the Anglo-Saxon Chronicle must be read in its own right, and set beside other material which reflects in one way or another on the conduct of government and warfare during Æthelred's reign. It is this evidence which is the basis for Keynes's view that the king lacked the strength, judgement and resolve to give adequate leadership to his people in a time of grave national crisis; who soon found out that he could rely on little but the treachery of his military commanders; and who, throughout his reign, tasted nothing but the ignominy of defeat. The raids exposed tensions and weaknesses which went deep into the fabric of the late Anglo-Saxon state, and it is apparent that events proceeded against a background more complex than the chronicler probably knew. It seems, for example, that the death of Bishop Æthelwold in 984 had precipitated further reaction against certain ecclesiastical interests; that by 993 the king had come to regret the error of his ways, leading to a period when the internal affairs of the kingdom appear to have prospered.

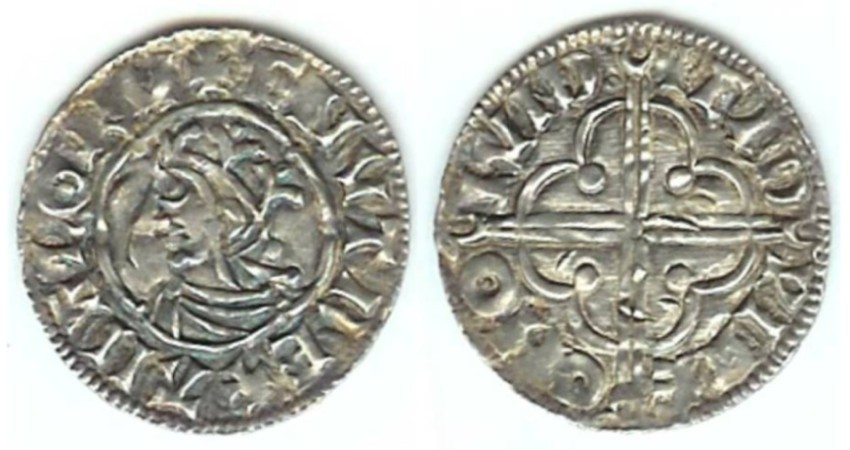
Cnut's 'Quatrefoil' type penny with the legend "CNUT REX ANGLORU[M]" (Cnut, King of the English), struck in London by the moneyer Edwin.

The increasingly difficult times brought on by the Viking attacks are reflected in both Ælfric's and Wulfstan's works, but most notably in Wulfstan's fierce rhetoric in the Sermo Lupi ad Anglos, dated to 1014. Malcolm Godden suggests that ordinary people saw the return of the Vikings as the imminent "expectation of the apocalypse", and this was given voice in Ælfric and Wulfstan writings, which is similar to that of Gildas and Bede. Raids were taken as signs of God punishing his people; Ælfric refers to people adopting the customs of the Danish and exhorts people not to abandon the native customs on behalf of the Danish ones, and then requests a "brother Edward" to try to put an end to a "shameful habit" of drinking and eating in the outhouse, which some of the countrywomen practised at beer parties.

In April 1016, Æthelred died of illness, leaving his son and successor Edmund Ironside to defend the country. The final struggles were complicated by internal dissension, and especially by the treacherous acts of Ealdorman Eadric of Mercia, who opportunistically changed sides to Cnut's party. After the defeat of the English in the Battle of Assandun in October 1016, Edmund and Cnut agreed to divide the kingdom so that Edmund would rule Wessex and Cnut Mercia, but Edmund died soon after his defeat in November 1016, making it possible for Cnut to seize power over all England.

==== Conquest of England: Danes, Norwegians and Normans (1016–1066) ====
In the 11th century, there were three conquests: one by Cnut on October 18, 1016; the second was an unsuccessful attempt of Battle of Stamford Bridge in September, 1066; and the third was conducted by William of Normandy in October, 1066 at Hastings. The consequences of each conquest changed the Anglo-Saxon culture. Politically and chronologically, the texts of this period are not Anglo-Saxon; linguistically, those written in English (as opposed to Latin or French, the other official written languages of the period) moved away from the late West Saxon standard that is called "Old English". Yet neither are they "Middle English"; moreover, as Treharne explains, for around three-quarters of this period, "there is barely any 'original' writing in English at all". These factors have led to a gap in scholarship, implying a discontinuity either side of the Norman Conquest, however this assumption is being challenged.

At first sight, there would seem little to debate. Cnut appeared to have adopted wholeheartedly the traditional role of Anglo-Saxon kingship. However, an examination of the laws, homilies, wills, and charters dating from this period suggests that as a result of widespread aristocratic death and the fact that Cnut did not systematically introduce a new landholding class, major and permanent alterations occurred in the Saxon social and political structures. Eric John remarks that for Cnut "the simple difficulty of exercising so wide and so unstable an empire made it necessary to practise a delegation of authority against every tradition of English kingship". The disappearance of the aristocratic families which had traditionally played an active role in the governance of the realm, coupled with Cnut's choice of thegnly advisors, put an end to the balanced relationship between monarchy and aristocracy so carefully forged by the West Saxon Kings.

Edward became king in 1042, and given his upbringing might have been considered a Norman by those who lived across the English Channel. Following Cnut's reforms, excessive power was concentrated in the hands of the rival houses of Leofric of Mercia and Godwine of Wessex. Problems also came for Edward from the resentment caused by the king's introduction of Norman friends. A crisis arose in 1051 when Godwine defied the king's order to punish the men of Dover, who had resisted an attempt by Eustace of Boulogne to quarter his men on them by force. The support of Earl Leofric and Earl Siward enabled Edward to secure the outlawry of Godwine and his sons; and William of Normandy paid Edward a visit during which Edward may have promised William succession to the English throne, although this Norman claim may have been mere propaganda. Godwine and his sons came back the following year with a strong force, and the magnates were not prepared to engage them in civil war but forced the king to make terms. Some unpopular Normans were driven out, including Archbishop Robert, whose archbishopric was given to Stigand; this act supplied an excuse for the Papal support of William's cause.

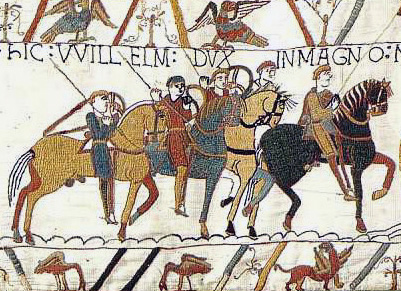
Depiction of the Battle of Hastings (1066) on the Bayeux Tapestry

The fall of England and the Norman Conquest is a multi-generational, multi-family succession problem caused in great part by Athelred's incompetence. By the time William of Normandy, sensing an opportunity, landed his invading force in 1066, the elite of Anglo-Saxon England had changed, although much of the culture and society had stayed the same.

Ða com Wyllelm eorl of Normandige into Pefnesea on Sancte Michæles mæsseæfen, sona þæs hi fere wæron, worhton castel æt Hæstingaport. Þis wearð þa Harolde cynge gecydd, he gaderade þa mycelne here, com him togenes æt þære haran apuldran, Wyllelm him com ongean on unwær, ær þis folc gefylced wære. Ac se kyng þeah him swiðe heardlice wið feaht mid þam mannum þe him gelæstan woldon, þær wearð micel wæl geslægen on ægðre healfe. Ðær wearð ofslægen Harold kyng, Leofwine eorl his broðor, Gyrð eorl his broðor, fela godra manna, þa Frencyscan ahton wælstowe geweald.

Then came William, the Earl of Normandy, into Pevensey on the evening of St Michael's mass, and soon as his men were ready, they built a fortress at Hasting's port. This was told to King Harold, and he gathered then a great army and came towards them at the Hoary Apple Tree, and William came upon him unawares before his folk were ready. But the king nevertheless withstood him very strongly with fighting with those men who would follow him, and there was a great slaughter on either side. Then Harald the King was slain, and Leofwine the Earl, his brother, and Gyrth, and many good men, and the Frenchmen held the place of slaughter.

=== After the Norman Conquest ===
Following the Norman conquest, many of the Anglo-Saxon nobility were either exiled or had joined the ranks of the peasantry. It has been estimated that only about 8% of the land was under Anglo-Saxon control by 1087. In 1086, only four major Anglo-Saxon landholders still held their lands. However, the survival of Anglo-Saxon heiresses was significantly greater. Many of the next generation of the nobility had English mothers and learned to speak English at home. Some Anglo-Saxon nobles fled to Scotland, Ireland, and Scandinavia. The Byzantine Empire became a popular destination for many Anglo-Saxon soldiers, as it was in need of mercenaries. The Anglo-Saxons became the predominant element in the elite Varangian Guard, hitherto a largely North Germanic unit, from which the emperor's bodyguard was drawn and continued to serve the empire until the early 15th century. However, the population of England at home remained largely Anglo-Saxon; for them, little changed immediately except that their Anglo-Saxon lord was replaced by a Norman lord.

The chronicler Orderic Vitalis, who was the product of an Anglo-Norman marriage, writes: "And so the English groaned aloud for their lost liberty and plotted ceaselessly to find some way of shaking off a yoke that was so intolerable and unaccustomed". The inhabitants of the North and Scotland never warmed to the Normans following the Harrying of the North (1069–1070), where William, according to the Anglo Saxon Chronicle utterly "ravaged and laid waste that shire".

Many Anglo-Saxon people needed to learn Norman French to communicate with their rulers, but it is clear that among themselves they kept speaking Old English, which meant that England was in an interesting tri-lingual situation: Anglo-Saxon for the common people, Latin for the Church, and Norman French for the administrators, the nobility, and the law courts. In this time, and because of the cultural shock of the Conquest, Anglo-Saxon began to change very rapidly, and by 1200 or so, it was no longer Anglo-Saxon English, but early Middle English. But this language had deep roots in Anglo-Saxon, which was being spoken much later than 1066. Research has shown that a form of Anglo-Saxon was still being spoken, and not merely among uneducated peasants, into the thirteenth century in the West Midlands. This was J.R.R. Tolkien's major scholarly discovery when he studied a group of texts written in early Middle English called the Katherine Group. Tolkien noticed that a subtle distinction preserved in these texts indicated that Old English had continued to be spoken far longer than anyone had supposed.

Old English had been a central mark of the Anglo-Saxon cultural identity. With the passing of time, however, and particularly following the Norman conquest of England, this language changed significantly, and although some people (for example the scribe known as the Tremulous Hand of Worcester) could still read Old English into the thirteenth century, it fell out of use and the texts became useless. The Exeter Book, for example, seems to have been used to press gold leaf and at one point had a pot of fish-based glue sitting on top of it. For Michael Drout this symbolises the end of the Anglo-Saxons.

After 1066, it took more than three centuries for English to replace French as the language of government. The 1362 parliament opened with a speech in English and in the early 15th century, Henry V became the first monarch, since before the 1066 conquest, to use English in his written instructions.

== Life and society ==
The larger narrative, seen in the history of Anglo-Saxon England, is the continued mixing and integration of various disparate elements into one Anglo-Saxon people. The outcome of this mixing and integration was a continuous re-interpretation by the Anglo-Saxons of their society and worldview, which Heinreich Härke calls a "complex and ethnically mixed society".

=== Kingship and kingdoms ===
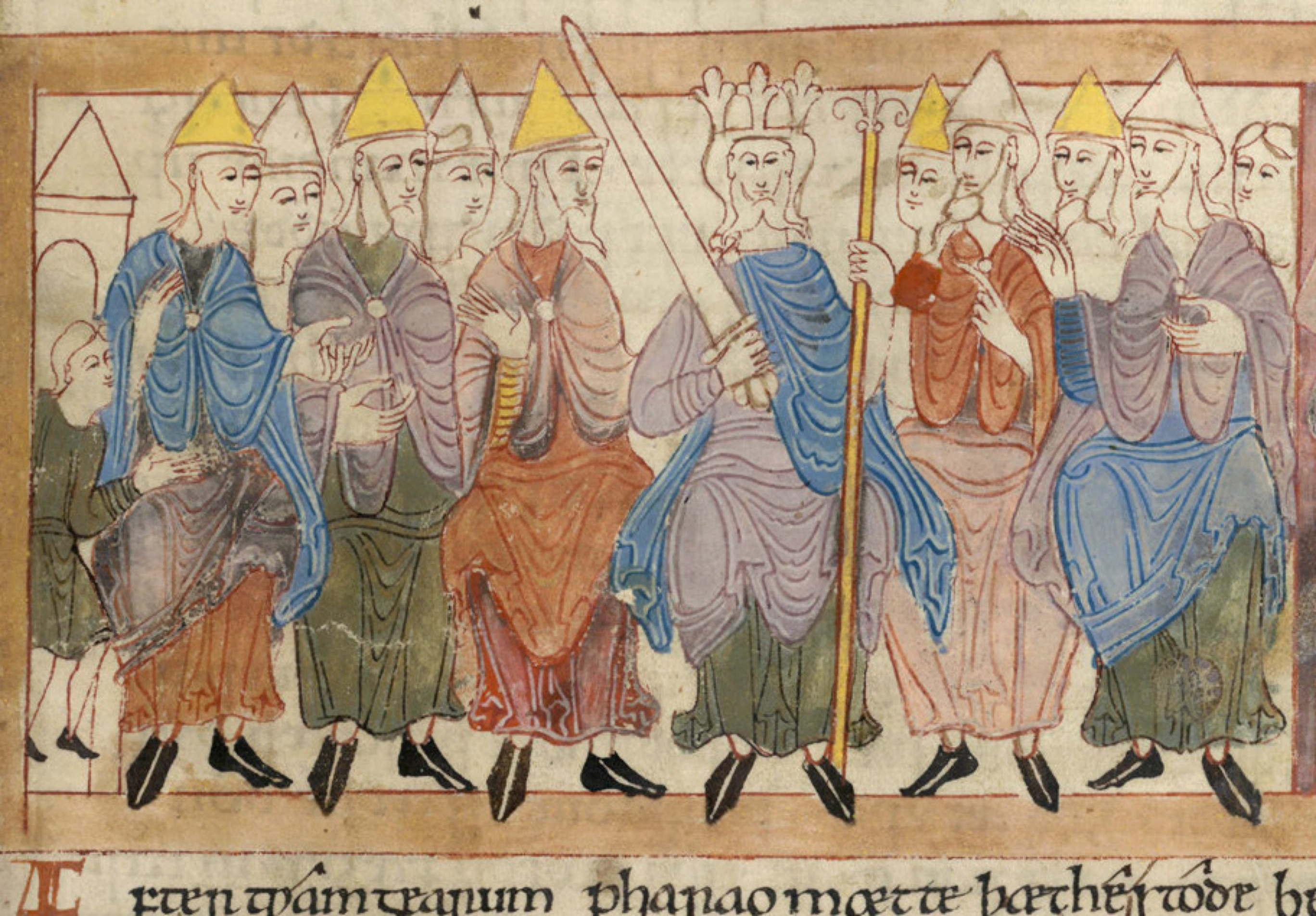
Anglo-Saxon king with his witan. Biblical scene in the Illustrated Old English Hexateuch (11th century) in the British Library, London

The development of Anglo-Saxon kingship is little understood before the 7th century. Royal dynasties often claimed descent from Woden or another deity to justify their rule, but the true basis of their power was as warleaders. Kings were buried as warriors, and war helmets instead of crowns were used in coronations until the 10th century. A king's relationship with his warband (Latin: comitatus) involved mutual obligations. His warriors fought for the king in return for food, shelter, and gifts such as weapons. The people supported their king and his warriors with food rent. Kings extracted surplus by raiding and collecting food rent and "prestige goods".

The later sixth century saw the end of a 'prestige goods' economy, as evidenced by the decline of accompanied burial, and the appearance of the first 'princely' graves and high-status settlements. The ship burial in mound one at Sutton Hoo (Suffolk) is the most widely known example of a 'princely' burial, containing lavish metalwork and feasting equipment, and possibly representing the burial place of King Raedwald of East Anglia. These centres of trade and production reflect the increased socio-political stratification and wider territorial authority which allowed seventh-century elites to extract and redistribute surpluses with far greater effectiveness than their sixth-century predecessors would have found possible. Anglo-Saxon society, in short, looked very different in 600 than it did a hundred years earlier.

By 600, the establishment of the first Anglo-Saxon 'emporia' (alternatively 'wics') appears to have been in process. There are only four major archaeologically attested wics in England – London, Ipswich, York, and Hamwic. These were originally interpreted by Richard Hodges as methods of royal control over the import of prestige goods, rather than centre of actual trade-proper. Despite archaeological evidence of royal involvement, emporia are now widely understood to represent genuine trade and exchange, alongside a return to urbanism.

According to Bede's Ecclesiastical History, England was divided into many petty kingdoms during the 7th century. The Tribal Hidage of the later 7th century lists 35 people groups south of the Humber. The first law code written in a Germanic language, the Law of Æthelberht, depicts a king not only as the leader of a warband but also as the maintainer of law and order. His laws concerned all levels of society: the nobility, ceorls (freemen), and slaves. Traders, missionaries, and other foreigners who lacked the protection of a lord or kinship ties were under the king's protection (Old English: mund).

The most powerful king could be recognised by other rulers as bretwalda (Old English for "ruler of Britain"). Bede's use of the term imperium has been seen as significant in defining the status and powers of the bretwaldas, in fact it is a word Bede used regularly as an alternative to regnum; scholars believe this just meant the collection of tribute. Oswiu's extension of overlordship over the Picts and Scots is expressed in terms of making them tributary. Military overlordship could bring great short-term success and wealth, but the system had its disadvantages. Many of the overlords enjoyed their powers for a relatively short period. (Note: Oswiu of Northumbria (642–70) only won authority over the southern kingdoms after he defeated Penda at the battle of the Winwæd in 655 and must have lost it again soon after Wulfhere regained control in Mercia in 658.) Foundations had to be carefully laid to turn a tribute-paying under-kingdom into a permanent acquisition, such as Bernician absorption of Deira.

Only five Anglo-Saxon kingdoms are known to have survived to 800, and several British kingdoms in the west of the country had disappeared as well. The major kingdoms had grown through absorbing smaller principalities, and the means through which they did it and the character their kingdoms acquired as a result are one of the major themes of the Middle Saxon period. Beowulf, for all its heroic content, clearly makes the point that economic and military success were intimately linked. A 'good' king was a generous king who through his wealth won the support which would ensure his supremacy over other kingdoms. The smaller kingdoms did not disappear without trace once they were incorporated into larger polities; on the contrary their territorial integrity was preserved when they became ealdormanries or, depending on size, parts of ealdormanries within their new kingdoms. An example of this tendency for later boundaries to preserve earlier arrangements is Sussex; the county boundary is essentially the same as that of the West Saxon shire and the Anglo-Saxon kingdom.

The Witan, also called Witenagemot, was the council of kings; its essential duty was to advise the king on all matters on which he chose to ask its opinion. It attested his grants of land to churches or laymen, consented to his issue of new laws or new statements of ancient custom, and helped him deal with rebels and persons suspected of disaffection.

King Alfred's digressions in his translation of Boethius' Consolation of Philosophy, provided these observations about the resources which every king needed:

In the case of the king, the resources and tools with which to rule are that he have his land fully manned: he must have praying men, fighting men and working men. You know also that without these tools no king may make his ability known. Another aspect of his resources is that he must have the means of support for his tools, the three classes of men. These, then, are their means of support: land to live on, gifts, weapons, food, ale, clothing and whatever else is necessary for each of the three classes of men.

This is the first written appearance of the division of society into the 'three orders'; the 'working men' provided the raw materials to support the other two classes. The advent of Christianity brought with it the introduction of new concepts of land tenure. The role of churchmen was analogous with that of the warriors waging heavenly warfare. However what Alfred was alluding to was that in order for a king to fulfil his responsibilities towards his people, particularly those concerned with defence, he had the right to make considerable exactions from the landowners and people of his kingdom. The need to endow the church resulted in the permanent alienation of stocks of land which had previously only been granted on a temporary basis and introduced the concept of a new type of hereditary land which could be freely alienated and was free of any family claims.

The nobility under the influence of Alfred became involved with developing the cultural life of their kingdom. As the kingdom became unified, it brought the monastic and spiritual life of the kingdom under one rule and stricter control. However the Anglo-Saxons believed in 'luck' as a random element in the affairs of man and so would probably have agreed that there is a limit to the extent one can understand why one kingdom failed while another succeeded. They also believed in 'destiny' and interpreted the fate of the kingdom of England with Biblical and Carolingian ideology, with parallels, between the Israelites, the great European empires and the Anglo-Saxons. Danish and Norman conquests were just the manner in which God punished his sinful people and the fate of great empires.

=== Religion ===
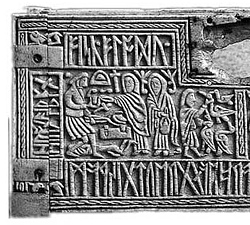
The right half of the front panel of the seventh-century Franks Casket, depicting the pan-Germanic legend of Wayland the Smith, which was apparently also a part of Anglo-Saxon pagan mythology.

Although Christianity dominates the religious history of the Anglo-Saxons, life in the 5th and 6th centuries was dominated by pagan religious beliefs with a Scandinavian-Germanic heritage.

Pagan Anglo-Saxons worshipped at a variety of different sites across their landscape, some of which were apparently specially built temples and others that were natural geographical features such as sacred trees, hilltops or wells. According to place name evidence, these sites of worship were known alternately as either hearg or as wēoh. Most poems from before the Norman Conquest are steeped in pagan symbolism, and their integration into the new faith goes beyond the literary sources. Thus, as Lethbridge reminds us, "to say, 'this is a monument erected in Christian times and therefore the symbolism on it must be Christian,' is an unrealistic approach. The rites of the older faith, now regarded as superstition, are practised all over the country today. It did not mean that people were not Christian; but that they could see a lot of sense in the old beliefs also."

Early Anglo-Saxon society attached great significance to the horse; a horse may have been an acquaintance of the god Woden, or they may have been (according to Tacitus) confidants of the gods. Horses were closely associated with gods, especially Odin and Freyr. Horses played a central role in funerary practices as well as in other rituals. Horses were prominent symbols of fertility, and there were many horse fertility cults. The rituals associated with these include horse fights, burials, consumption of horse meat, and horse sacrifice. Hengist and Horsa, the mythical ancestors of the Anglo-Saxons, were associated with horses, (Note: Their names mean, literally, "Stallion" and "Horse") and references to horses are found throughout Anglo-Saxon literature. Actual horse burials in England are relatively rare and "may point to influence from the continent". A well-known Anglo-Saxon horse burial (from the sixth/seventh century) is Mound 17 at Sutton Hoo, a few yards from the more famous ship burial in Mound 1. A sixth-century grave near Lakenheath, Suffolk, yielded the body of a man next to that of a complete horse in harness, with a bucket of food by its head.

Bede's story of Cædmon, the cowherd who became the 'Father of English Poetry,' represents the real heart of the conversion of the Anglo-Saxons from paganism to Christianity. Bede writes, "[t]here was in the Monastery of this Abbess (Streonæshalch – now known as Whitby Abbey) a certain brother particularly remarkable for the Grace of God, who was wont to make religious verses, so that whatever was interpreted to him out of scripture, he soon after put the same into poetical expressions of much sweetness and humility in Old English, which was his native language. By his verse the minds of many were often excited to despise the world, and to aspire to heaven." The story of Cædmon illustrates the blending of Christian and Germanic, Latin and oral tradition, monasteries and double monasteries, pre-existing customs and new learning, popular and elite, that characterizes the Conversion period of Anglo-Saxon history and culture. Cædmon does not destroy or ignore traditional Anglo-Saxon poetry. Instead, he converts it into something that helps the Church. Anglo-Saxon England finds ways to synthesize the religion of the Church with the existing "northern" customs and practices. Thus the conversion of the Anglo-Saxons was not just their switching from one practice to another, but making something new out of their old inheritance and their new belief and learning.

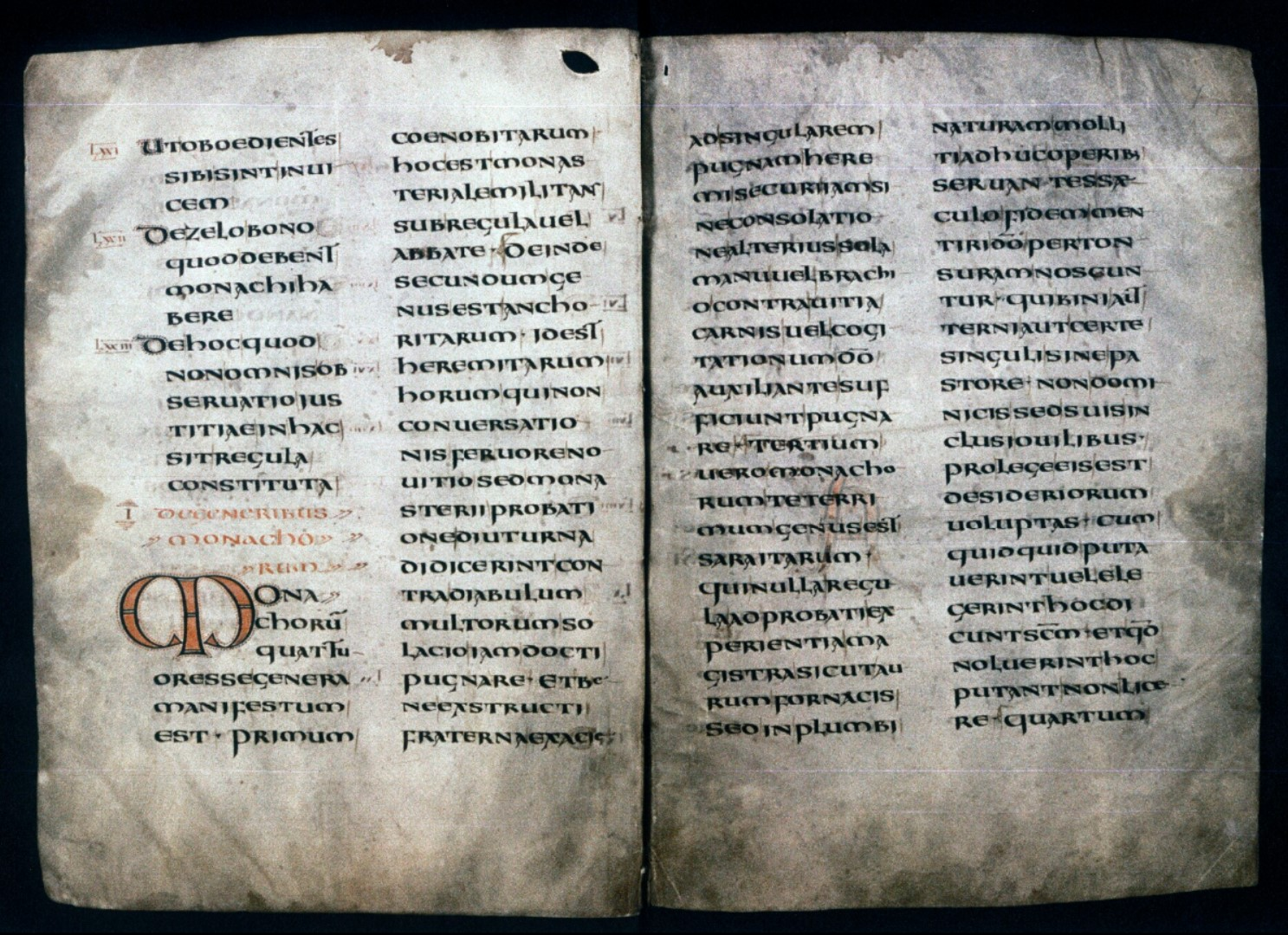
An 8th-century copy of the Rule of St. Benedict

Monasticism, and not just the church, was at the centre of Anglo-Saxon Christian life. Western monasticism, as a whole, had been evolving since the time of the Desert Fathers, but in the seventh century, monasticism in England confronted a dilemma that brought to question the truest representation of the Christian faith. The two monastic traditions were the Celtic and the Roman, and a decision was made to adopt the Roman tradition. Monasteria seem to describe all religious congregations other than those of the bishop.

In the 10th century, Dunstan brought Athelwold to Glastonbury, where the two of them set up a monastery on Benedictine lines. For many years, this was the only monastery in England that strictly followed the Benedictine Rule and observed complete monastic discipline. What Mechthild Gretsch calls an "Aldhelm Seminar" developed at Glastonbury, and the effects of this seminar on the curriculum of learning and study in Anglo-Saxon England were enormous. Royal power was put behind the reforming impulses of Dunstan and Athelwold, helping them to enforce their reform ideas. This happened first at the Old Minster in Winchester, before the reformers built new foundations and refoundations at Thorney, Peterborough, and Ely, among other places. Benedictine monasticism spread throughout England, and these became centers of learning again, run by people trained in Glastonbury, with one rule, the works of Aldhelm at the center of their curricula but also influenced by the vernacular efforts of Alfred. From this mixture sprung a great flowering of literary production.

=== Fighting and warfare ===
Soldiers throughout the country were summoned, for both offensive and defensive war; early armies consisted essentially of household bands, while later on men were recruited on a territorial basis. The mustering of an army, annually at times, occupied an important place in Frankish history, both military and constitutional. The English kingdoms appear to have known no institution similar to this. The earliest reference is Bede's account of the overthrow of the Northumbrian Æthelfrith by Rædwald overlord of the southern English. Rædwald raised a large army, presumably from among the kings who accepted his overlordship, and "not giving him time to summon and assemble his whole army, Rædwald met him with a much greater force and slew him on the Mercian border on the east bank of the river Idle." At the Battle of Edington in 878, when the Danes made a surprise attack on Alfred at Chippenham after Twelfth Night, Alfred retreated to Athelney after Easter and then seven weeks after Easter mustered an army at "Egbert's stone". It is not difficult to imagine that Alfred sent out word to the ealdormen to call his men to arms. This may explain the delay, and it is probably no more than coincidence that the army mustered at the beginning of May, a time when there would have been sufficient grass for the horses. There is also information about the mustering of fleets in the eleventh century. From 992 to 1066 fleets were assembled at London, or returned to the city at the end of their service, on several occasions. Where they took up station depended on the quarter from which a threat was expected: Sandwich if invasion was expected from the north, or the Isle of Wight if it was from Normandy.

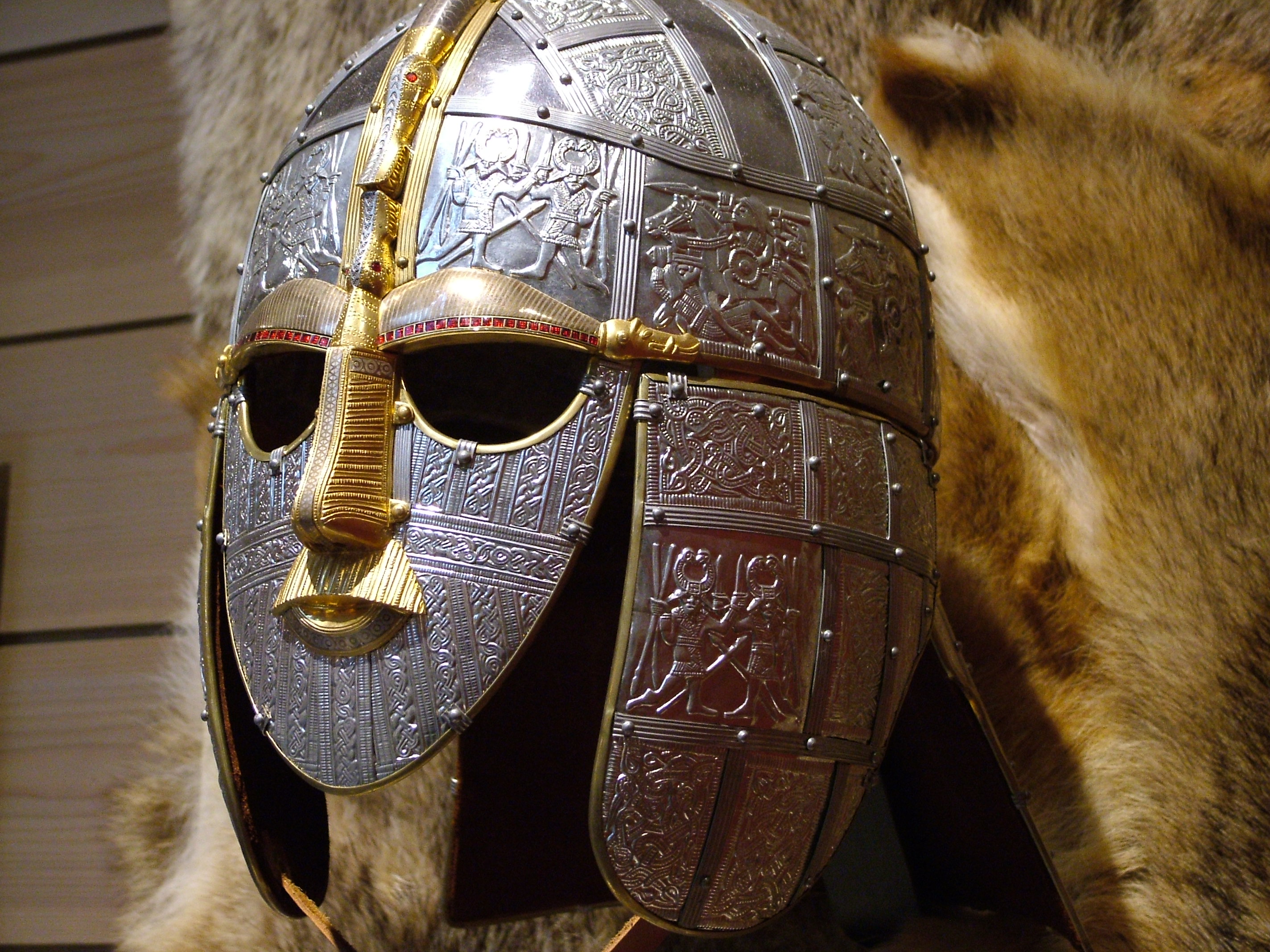
Replica of the Sutton Hoo helmet

Once they left home, these armies and fleets had to be supplied with food and clothing for the men as well as forage for the horses. Yet if armies of the seventh and eighth centuries were accompanied by servants and a supply train of lesser free men, Alfred found these arrangements insufficient to defeat the Vikings. One of his reforms was to divide his military resources into thirds. One part manned the burhs and found the permanent garrisons which would make it impossible for the Danes to overrun Wessex, although they would also take to the field when extra soldiers were needed. The remaining two would take it in turns to serve. They were allocated a fixed term of service and brought the necessary provisions with them. This arrangement did not always function well. On one occasion a division on service went home in the middle of blockading a Danish army on Thorney Island; its provisions were consumed and its term had expired before the king came to relieve them. This method of division and rotation remained in force up to 1066. In 917, when armies from Wessex and Mercia were in the field from early April until November, one division went home and another took over. Again, in 1052 when Edward's fleet was waiting at Sandwich to intercept Godwine's return, the ships returned to London to take on new earls and crews. The importance of supply, vital to military success, was appreciated even if it was taken for granted and features only incidentally in the sources.

Military training and strategy are two important matters on which the sources are typically silent. There are no references in literature or laws to men training, and so it is necessary to fall back on inference. For the noble warrior, his childhood was of first importance in learning both individual military skills and the teamwork essential for success in battle. Perhaps the games the youthful Cuthbert played ('wrestling, jumping, running, and every other exercise') had some military significance. Turning to strategy, of the period before Alfred the evidence gives the impression that Anglo-Saxon armies fought battles frequently. Battle was risky and best avoided unless all the factors were on your side. But if you were in a position so advantageous that you were willing to take the chance, it is likely that your enemy would be in such a weak position that he would avoid battle and pay tribute. Battles put the princes' lives at risk, as is demonstrated by the Northumbrian and Mercian overlordships brought to an end by a defeat in the field. Gillingham has shown how few pitched battles Charlemagne and Richard I chose to fight.

A defensive strategy becomes more apparent in the later part of Alfred's reign. It was built around the possession of fortified places and the close pursuit of the Danes to harass them and impede their preferred occupation of plundering. Alfred and his lieutenants were able to fight the Danes to a standstill by their repeated ability to pursue and besiege them closely in fortified camps throughout the country. The fortification of sites at Witham, Buckingham, Towcester and Colchester persuaded the Danes of the surrounding regions to submit. The key to this warfare was sieges and the control of fortified places. It is clear that the new fortresses had permanent garrisons, and that they were supported by the inhabitants of the existing burhs when danger threatened. This is brought out most clearly in the description of the campaigns of 917 in the Chronicle, but throughout the conquest of the Danelaw by Edward and Æthelflæd it is clear that a sophisticated and coordinated strategy was being applied.

In 973, a single currency was introduced into England in order to bring about political unification, but by concentrating bullion production at many coastal mints, the new rulers of England created an obvious target which attracted a new wave of Viking invasions, which came close to breaking up the kingdom of the English. From 980 onwards, the Anglo -Saxon Chronicle records renewed raiding against England. At first, the raids were probing ventures by small numbers of ships' crews, but soon grew in size and effect, until the only way of dealing with the Vikings appeared to be to pay protection money to buy them off: "And in that year [991] it was determined that tribute should first be paid to the Danish men because of the great terror they were causing along the coast. The first payment was 10,000 pounds." The payment of Danegeld had to be underwritten by a huge balance of payments surplus; this could only be achieved by stimulating exports and cutting imports, itself accomplished through currency devaluation. This affected everyone in the kingdom.

=== Settlements and working life ===
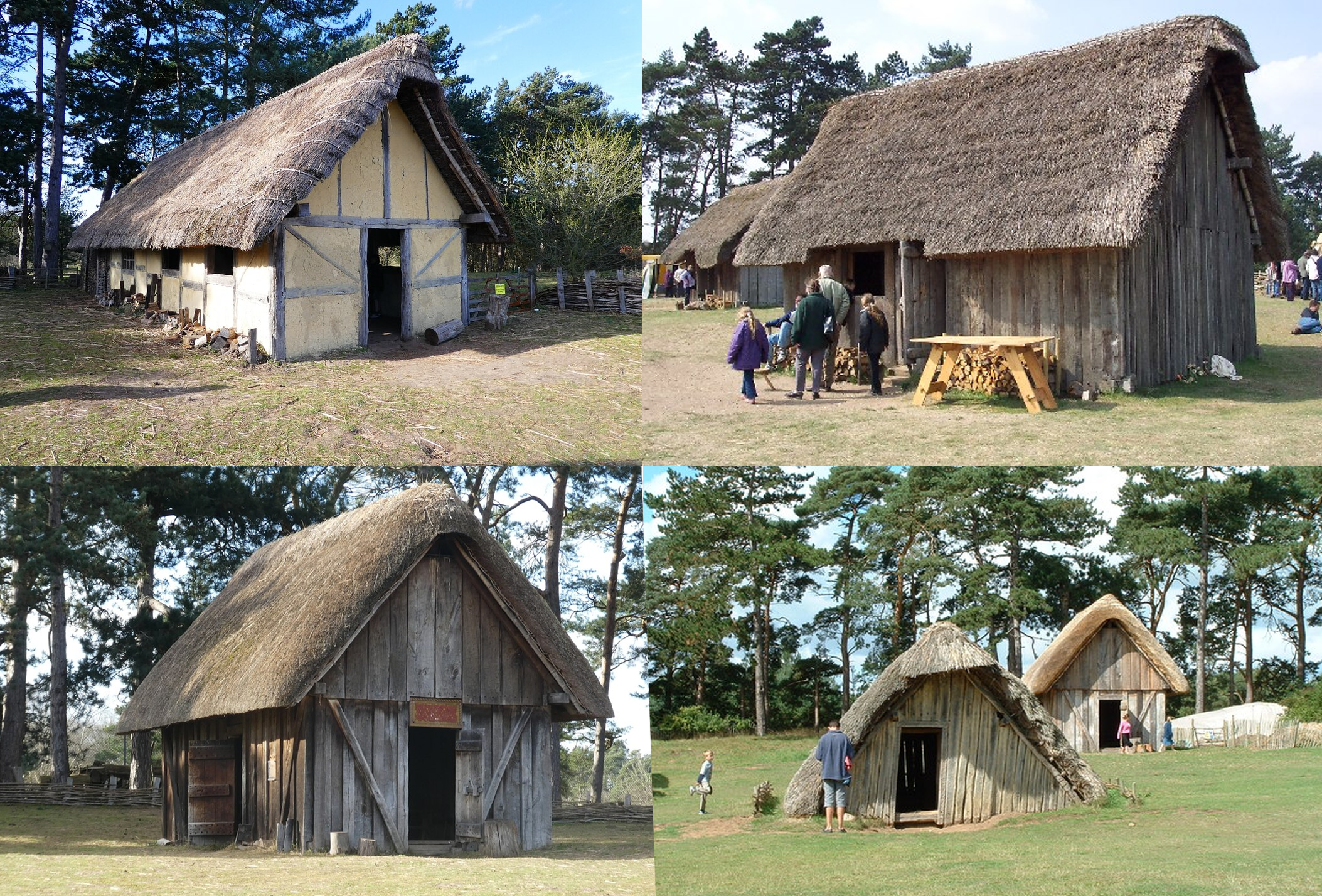
Reconstructed buildings from West Stow Anglo-Saxon Village, Suffolk

Helena Hamerow suggests that the prevailing model of working life and settlement, particularly for the early period, was one of shifting settlement and building tribal kinship. The mid-Saxon period saw diversification, the development of enclosures, the beginning of the toft system, closer management of livestock, the gradual spread of the mould-board plough, 'informally regular plots' and a greater permanence, with further settlement consolidation thereafter foreshadowing post-Norman Conquest villages. The later periods saw a proliferation of service features including barns, mills and latrines, most markedly on high-status sites. Throughout the Anglo-Saxon period as Hamerow suggests, "local and extended kin groups remained...the essential unit of production". This is very noticeable in the early period. However, by the tenth and eleventh centuries, the rise of the manor and its significance in terms of both settlement and the management of land, which becomes very evident in the Domesday Book of 1086.

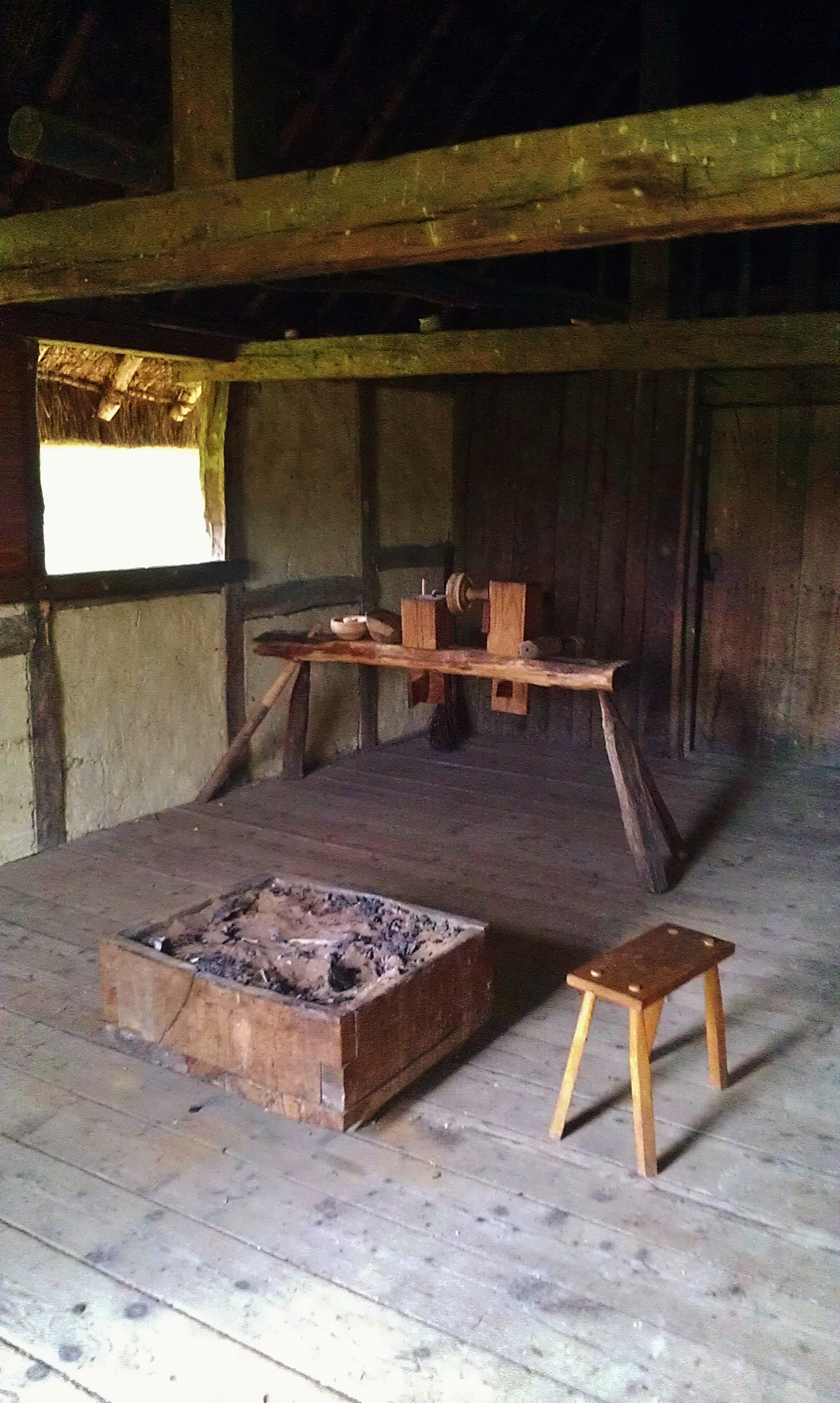
Reconstructed workshop at West Stow Anglo-Saxon village

Typical Anglo-Saxon farms of middle period are often characterised as "peasant farms" but a ceorl, who was the lowest ranking freeman in early Anglo-Saxon society, was not a peasant but an arms-owning male with the support of a kindred, access to law and the wergild; situated at the apex of an extended household working at least one hide of land. The farmer had freedom and rights over lands, with provision of a rent or duty to an overlord who provided only slight lordly input. (Note: There is much evidence for loosely managed and shifting cultivation and no evidence of "top down" structured landscape planning.) Most of this land was common outfield arable land (of an outfield-infield system) that provided individuals with the means to build a basis of kinship and group cultural ties.

The collection of buildings discovered at Yeavering formed part of an Anglo-Saxon royal vill or king's tun. These 'tun' consisted of a series of buildings designed to provide short-term accommodation for the king and his household. It is thought that the king would have travelled throughout his land dispensing justice and authority and collecting rents from his various estates. Such visits would be periodic, and it is likely that he would visit each royal villa only once or twice per year. The Latin term villa regia which Bede uses of the site suggests an estate centre as the functional heart of a territory held in the king's demesne. The territory is the land whose surplus production is taken into the centre as food-render to support the king and his retinue on their periodic visits as part of a progress around the kingdom. This territorial model, known as a multiple estate or shire, has been developed in a range of studies. Colm O'Brien, in applying this to Yeavering, proposes a geographical definition of the wider shire of Yeavering and also a geographical definition of the principal estate whose structures Hope-Taylor excavated. One characteristic that the king's tun shared with some other groups of places is that it was a point of public assembly. People came together not only to give the king and his entourage board and lodging; but they attended upon the king in order to have disputes settled, cases appealed, lands granted, gifts given, appointments made, laws promulgated, policy debated, and ambassadors heard. People also assembled for other reasons, such as to hold fairs and to trade.

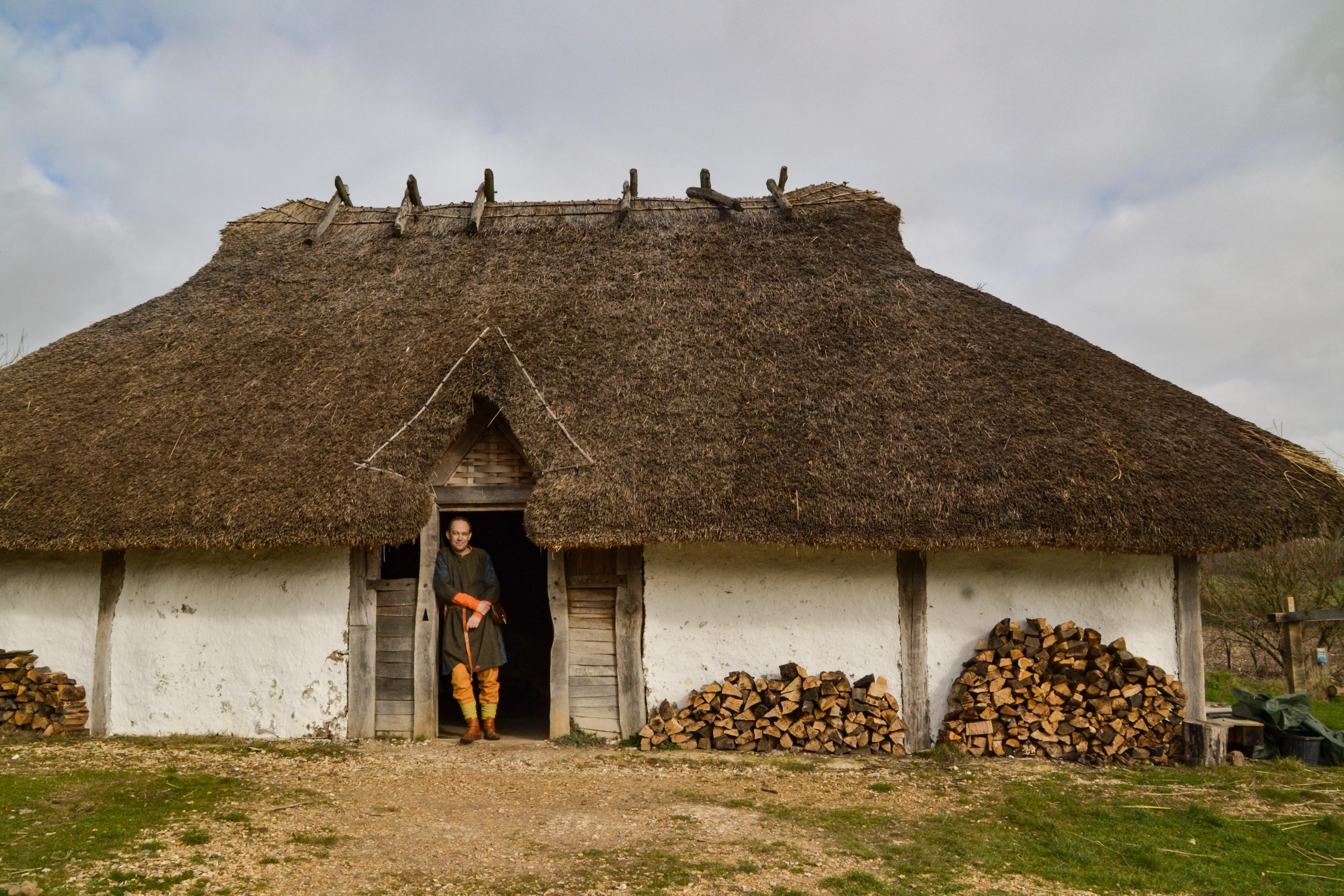
Reconstructed Anglo-Saxon house at Butser Ancient Farm, Hampshire

The first creations of towns are linked to a system of specialism at individual settlements, which is evidenced in studying place-names. Sutterton, "shoe-makers' tun" (in the area of the Danelaw such places are Sutterby) was so named because local circumstances allowed the growth of a craft recognised by the people of surrounding places. Similarly with Sapperton, the "soap-makers' tun". While Boultham, the "meadow with burdock plants", may well have developed a specialism in the production of burrs for wool-carding, since meadows with burdock merely growing in them must have been relatively numerous. From places named for their services or location within a single district, a category of which the most obvious perhaps are the Eastons and Westons, it is possible to move outwards to glimpse component settlements within larger economic units. Names betray some role within a system of seasonal pasture, Winderton in Warwickshire is the winter tun and various Somertons are self-explanatory. Hardwicks are dairy farms and Swinhopes the valleys where pigs were pastured.

Settlement patterns as well as village plans in England fall into two great categories: scattered farms and homesteads in upland and woodland Britain, nucleated villages across a swathe of central England. The chronology of nucleated villages is much debated and not yet clear. Yet there is strong evidence to support the view that nucleation occurred in the tenth century or perhaps the ninth, and was a development parallel to the growth of towns.

=== Women, children and slaves ===
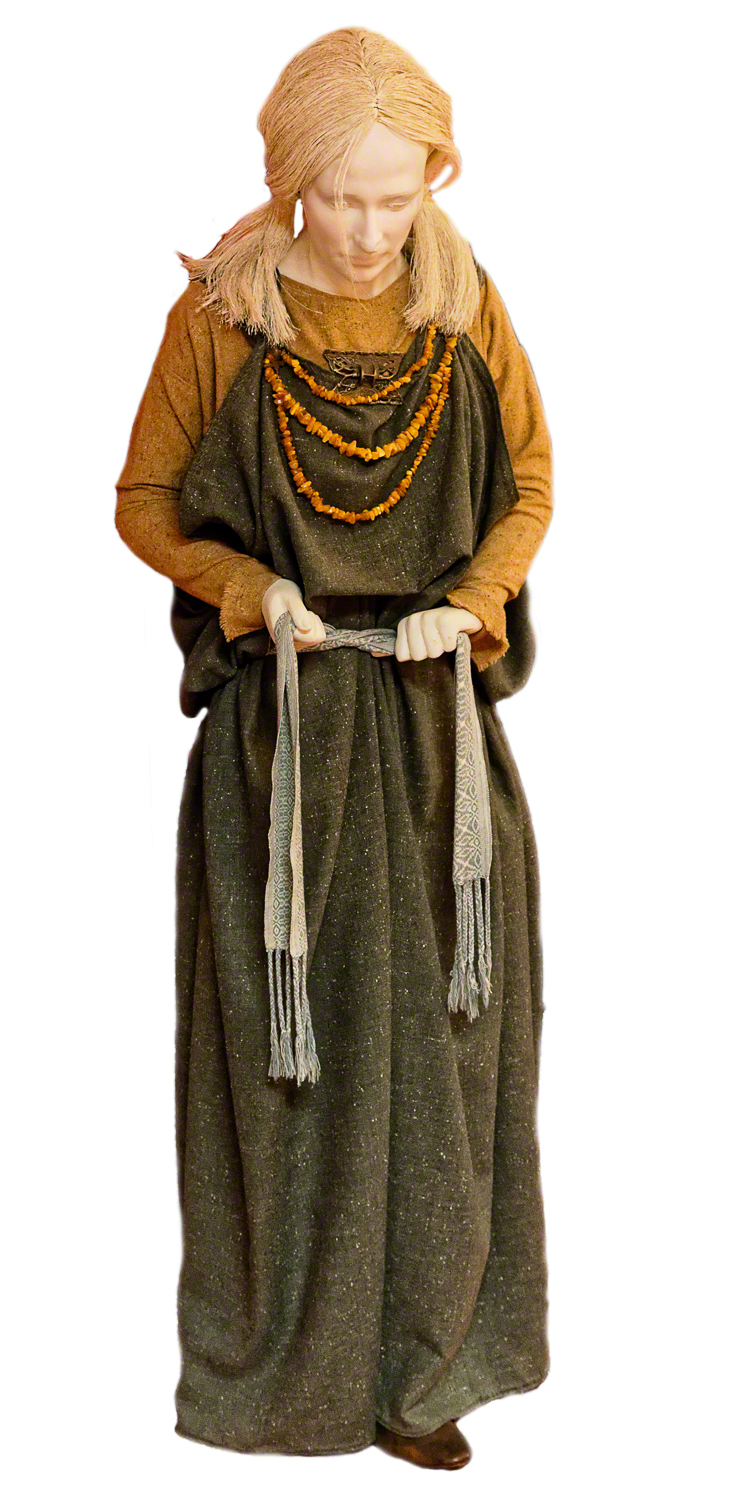
An Anglo Saxon woman's attire shown at West Stow Anglo-Saxon Village

Alfred's reference to 'praying men, fighting men and working men' is far from a complete description of his society. Women in the Anglo-Saxon kingdoms appear to have enjoyed considerable independence, whether as abbesses of the great 'double monasteries' of monks and nuns founded during the seventh and eighth centuries, as major land-holders recorded in Domesday Book (1086), or as ordinary members of society. They could act as principals in legal transactions, were entitled to the same weregild as men of the same class, and were considered 'oath-worthy', with the right to defend themselves on oath against false accusations or claims. Sexual and other offences against them were penalised heavily. There is evidence that even married women could own property independently, and some surviving wills are in the joint names of husband and wife.

Marriage comprised a contract between the woman's family and the prospective bridegroom, who was required to pay a 'bride-price' in advance of the wedding and a 'morning gift' following its consummation. The latter became the woman's personal property, but the former may have been paid to her relatives, at least during the early period. Widows were in a particularly favourable position, with inheritance rights, custody of their children and authority over dependents. However, a degree of vulnerability may be reflected in laws stating that they should not be forced into nunneries or second marriages against their will. The system of primogeniture (inheritance by the first-born male) was not introduced to England until after the Norman Conquest, so Anglo-Saxon siblings – girls as well as boys – were more equal in terms of status.

The age of majority was usually either ten or twelve, when a child could legally take charge of inherited property, or be held responsible for a crime. It was common for children to be fostered, either in other households or in monasteries, perhaps as a means of extending the circle of protection beyond the kin group. Laws also make provision for orphaned children and foundlings.

The traditional distinction in society, amongst free men, was expressed as eorl and ceorl ('earl and churl') though the term 'Earl' took on a more restricted meaning after the Viking period. The noble rank is designated in early centuries as gesiþas ('companions') or þegnas ('thegns'), the latter coming to predominate. After the Norman Conquest the title 'thegn' was equated to the Norman 'baron'. A certain amount of social mobility is implied by regulations detailing the conditions under which a ceorl could become a thegn. Again these would have been subject to local variation, but one text refers to the possession of five hides of land (around 600 acres), a bell and a castle-gate, a seat and a special office in the king's hall. In the context of the control of boroughs, Frank Stenton notes that according to an 11th-century source, "a merchant who had carried out three voyages at his own charge [had also been] regarded as of thegnly status." Loss of status could also occur, as with penal slavery, which could be imposed not only on the perpetrator of a crime but on his wife and family.

A further division in Anglo-Saxon society was between slave and free. Slavery was not as common as in other societies, but appears to have been present throughout the period. Both the freemen and slaves were hierarchically structured, with several classes of freemen and many types of slaves. These varied at different times and in different areas, but the most prominent ranks within free society were the king, the nobleman or thegn, and the ordinary freeman or ceorl. They were differentiated primarily by the value of their weregild or 'man price', which was not only the amount payable in compensation for homicide, but was also used as the basis for other legal formulations such as the value of the oath that they could swear in a court of law. Slaves had no weregild, as offences against them were taken to be offences against their owners, but the earliest laws set out a detailed scale of penalties depending both on the type of slave and the rank of owner.

Some slaves may have been members of the native British population conquered by the Anglo-Saxons when they arrived from the continent; others may have been captured in wars between the early kingdoms, or have sold themselves for food in times of famine. However, slavery was not always permanent, and slaves who had gained their freedom would become part of an underclass of freedmen below the rank of ceorl.

== Culture ==
=== Architecture ===
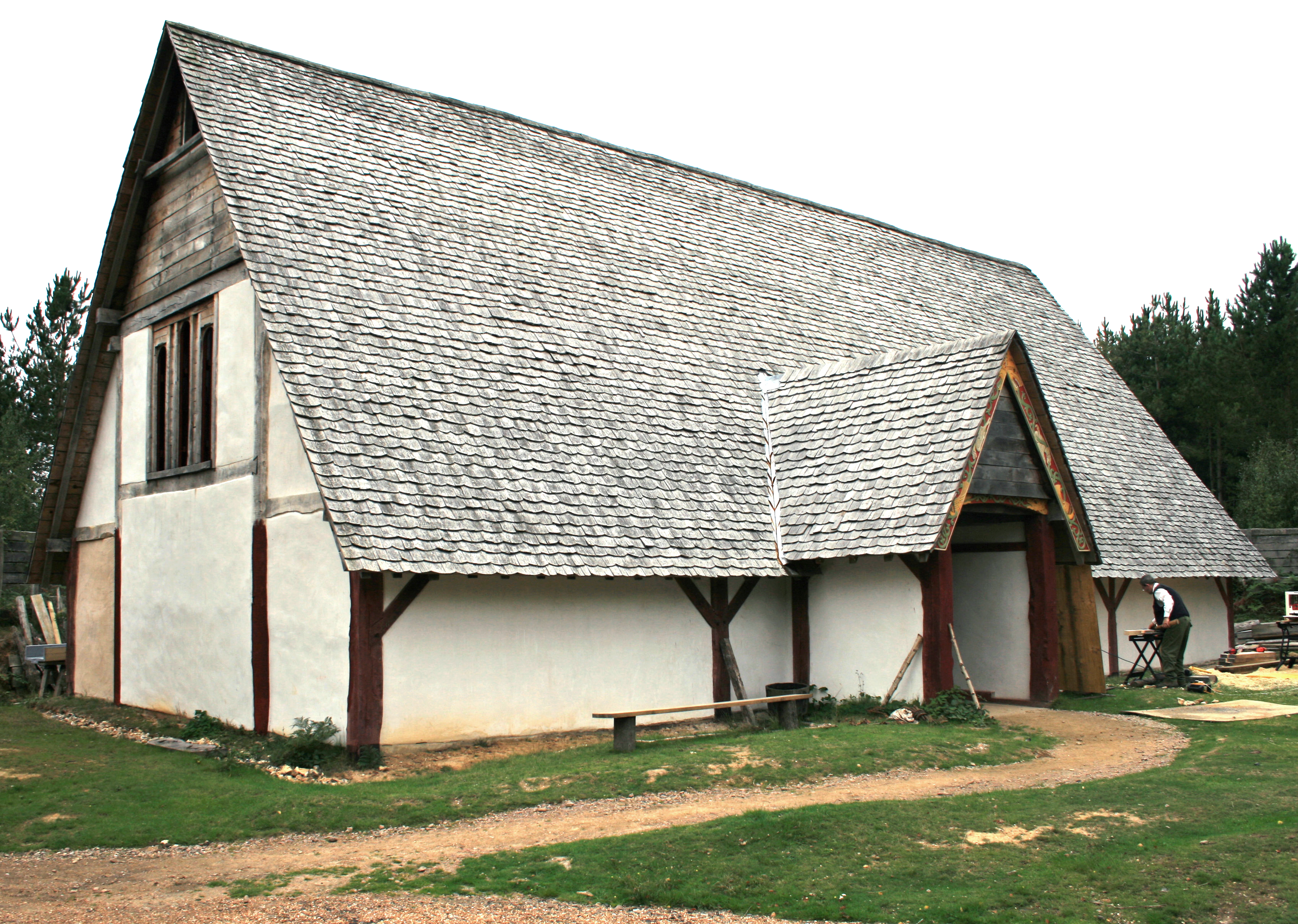
Reconstruction of an Anglo-Saxon hall at Wychurst, Kent,c. 1000 AD

Early Anglo-Saxon buildings in Britain were generally simple, not using masonry except in foundations but constructed mainly using timber with thatch roofing. Generally preferring not to settle within the old Roman cities, the Anglo-Saxons built small towns near their centres of agriculture, at fords in rivers, or near natural ports. In each town, a main hall was in the centre, provided with a central hearth. (Note: York and London both offer examples of this trend.)

Only ten of the hundreds of settlement sites that have been excavated in England from this period have revealed masonry domestic structures and confined to a few specific contexts. Timber was the natural building medium of the age; the Anglo-Saxon word for "building" is timbe. Unlike in the Carolingian Empire, late Anglo-Saxon royal halls continued to be of timber in the manner of Yeavering centuries before, even though the king could clearly have mustered the resources to build in stone. Their preference must have been a conscious choice, perhaps an expression of deeply–embedded Germanic identity on the part of the Anglo-Saxon royalty.

Even the elite had simple buildings, with a central fire and a hole in the roof to let the smoke escape; the largest homes rarely had more than one floor and one room. Buildings varied widely in size, most were square or rectangular, though some round houses have been found. Frequently these buildings have sunken floors, with a shallow pit over which a plank floor was suspended. The pit may have been used for storage, but more likely was filled with straw for insulation. A variation on the sunken floor design has been found in towns, where the "basement" may be as deep as 9 feet, suggesting a storage or work area below a suspended floor. Another common design was simple post framing, with heavy posts set directly into the ground, supporting the roof. The space between the posts was filled in with wattle and daub, or occasionally, planks. The floors were generally packed earth, though planks were sometimes used. Roofing materials varied, with thatch being the most common, though turf and even wooden shingles were also used.

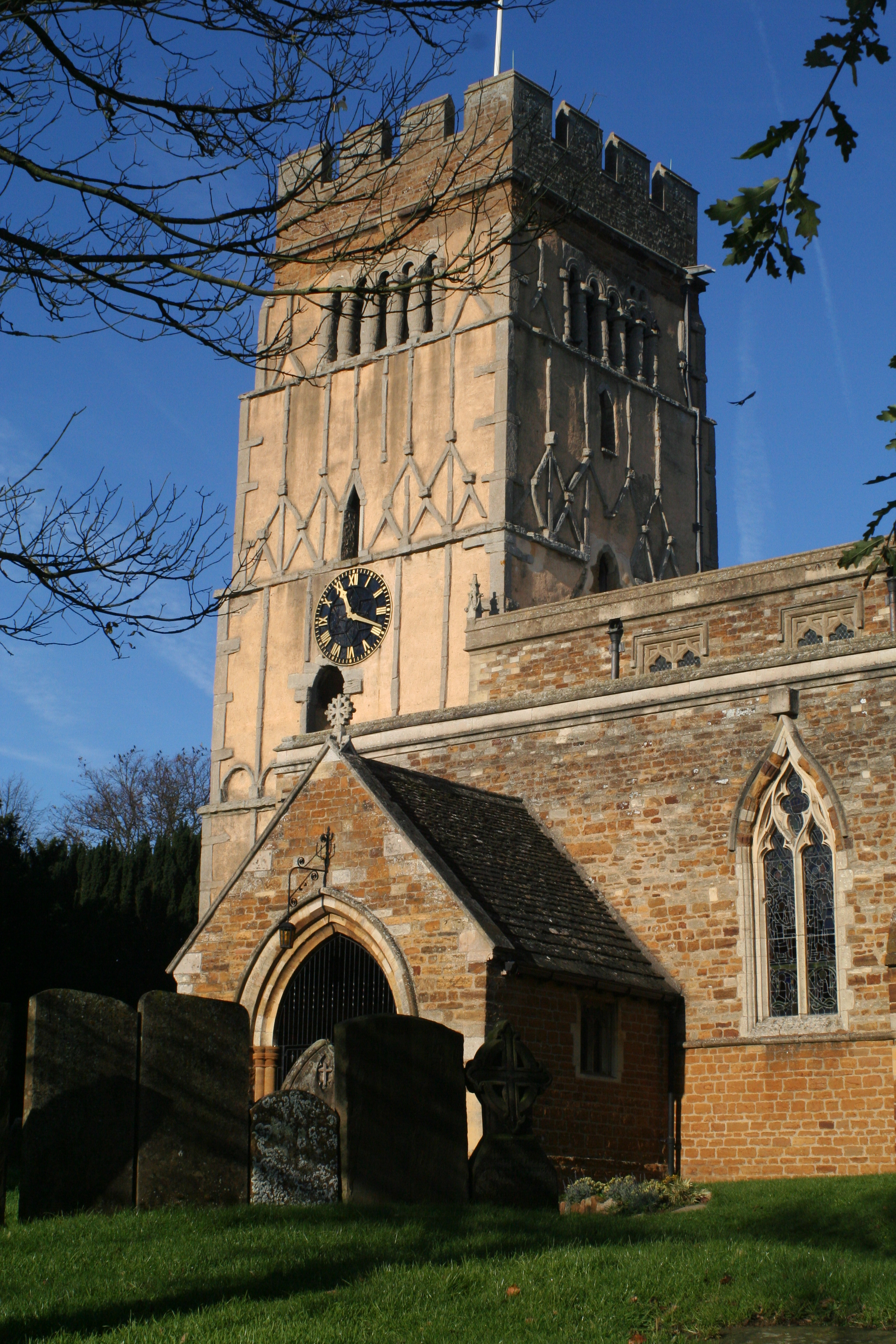
Distinctive Anglo-Saxon pilaster strips on the tower of All Saints' Church, Earls Barton

Stone was sometimes used to build churches. Bede makes it clear that the masonry construction of churches, including his own at Jarrow, was undertaken morem Romanorum, 'in the manner of the Romans,' in explicit contrast to existing traditions of timber construction. Even at Canterbury, Bede believed that St Augustine's first cathedral had been 'repaired' or 'recovered' (recuperavit) from an existing Roman church, when in fact it had been newly constructed from Roman materials. The belief was "the Christian Church was Roman, therefore a masonry church was a Roman building".

The building of churches in Anglo-Saxon England essentially began with Augustine of Canterbury in Kent following 597; for this he probably imported workmen from Frankish Gaul. The cathedral and abbey in Canterbury, together with churches in Kent at Minster in Sheppey (c. 664) and Reculver (669), and in Essex at the Chapel of St Peter-on-the-Wall at Bradwell-on-Sea, define the earliest type in southeast England. A simple nave without aisles provided the setting for the main altar; east of this a chancel arch separated the apse for use by the clergy. Flanking the apse and east end of the nave were side chambers serving as sacristies; further porticus might continue along the nave to provide for burials and other purposes. In Northumbria the early development of Christianity was influenced by the Irish mission, important churches being built in timber. Masonry churches became prominent from the late 7th century with the foundations of Wilfrid at Ripon and Hexham, and of Benedict Biscop at Monkwearmouth-Jarrow. These buildings had long naves and small rectangular chancels; porticus sometimes surrounded the naves. Elaborate crypts are a feature of Wilfrid's buildings. The best preserved early Northumbrian church is Escomb Church.

From the mid-8th century to the mid-10th century, several important buildings survive. One group comprises the first known churches utilizing aisles: Brixworth, the most ambitious Anglo-Saxon church to survive largely intact; Wareham St Mary's; Cirencester; and the rebuilding of Canterbury Cathedral. These buildings may be compared with churches in the Carolingian Empire. Other lesser churches may be dated to the late eighth and early ninth centuries on the basis of their elaborate sculptured decoration and have simple naves with side porticus. The tower of Barnack hearkens to the West Saxon reconquest in the early 10th century, when decorative features that were to be characteristic of Late Anglo-Saxon architecture were already developed, such as narrow raised bands of stone (pilaster strips) to surround archways and to articulate wall surfaces, as at Barton-upon-Humber and Earls Barton. In plan, however, the churches remained essentially conservative.

From the monastic revival of the second half of the tenth century, only a few documented buildings survive or have been excavated. Examples include the abbeys of Glastonbury; Old Minster, Winchester; Romsey; Cholsey; and Peterborough Cathedral. The majority of churches that have been described as Anglo-Saxon fall into the period between the late 10th century and the early 12th century. During this period, many settlements were first provided with stone churches, but timber also continued to be used; the best wood-framed church to survive is Greensted Church in Essex, no earlier than the 9th century, and no doubt typical of many parish churches. On the continent during the eleventh century, a group of interrelated Romanesque styles developed, associated with the rebuilding of many churches on a grand scale, made possible by a general advance in architectural technology and mason-craft.

The first fully Romanesque church in England was Edward the Confessor's rebuilding of Westminster Abbey (c. 1042–60, now entirely lost to later construction), while the main development of the style only followed the Norman Conquest. However, at Stow Minster the crossing piers of the early 1050s are clearly proto-Romanesque. A more decorative interpretation of Romanesque in lesser churches can be dated only somewhere between the mid and late 11th century, e.g. Hadstock (Essex), Clayton and Sompting (Sussex); this style continued towards the end of the century as at Milborne Port (Somerset). At St Augustine's Abbey in Canterbury (c. 1048–61) Abbot Wulfric aimed to retain the earlier churches while linking them with an octagonal rotunda, but the concept was still essentially Pre-Romanesque. Anglo-Saxon churches of all periods would have been embellished with a range of arts, including wall-paintings, some stained glass, metalwork and statues.

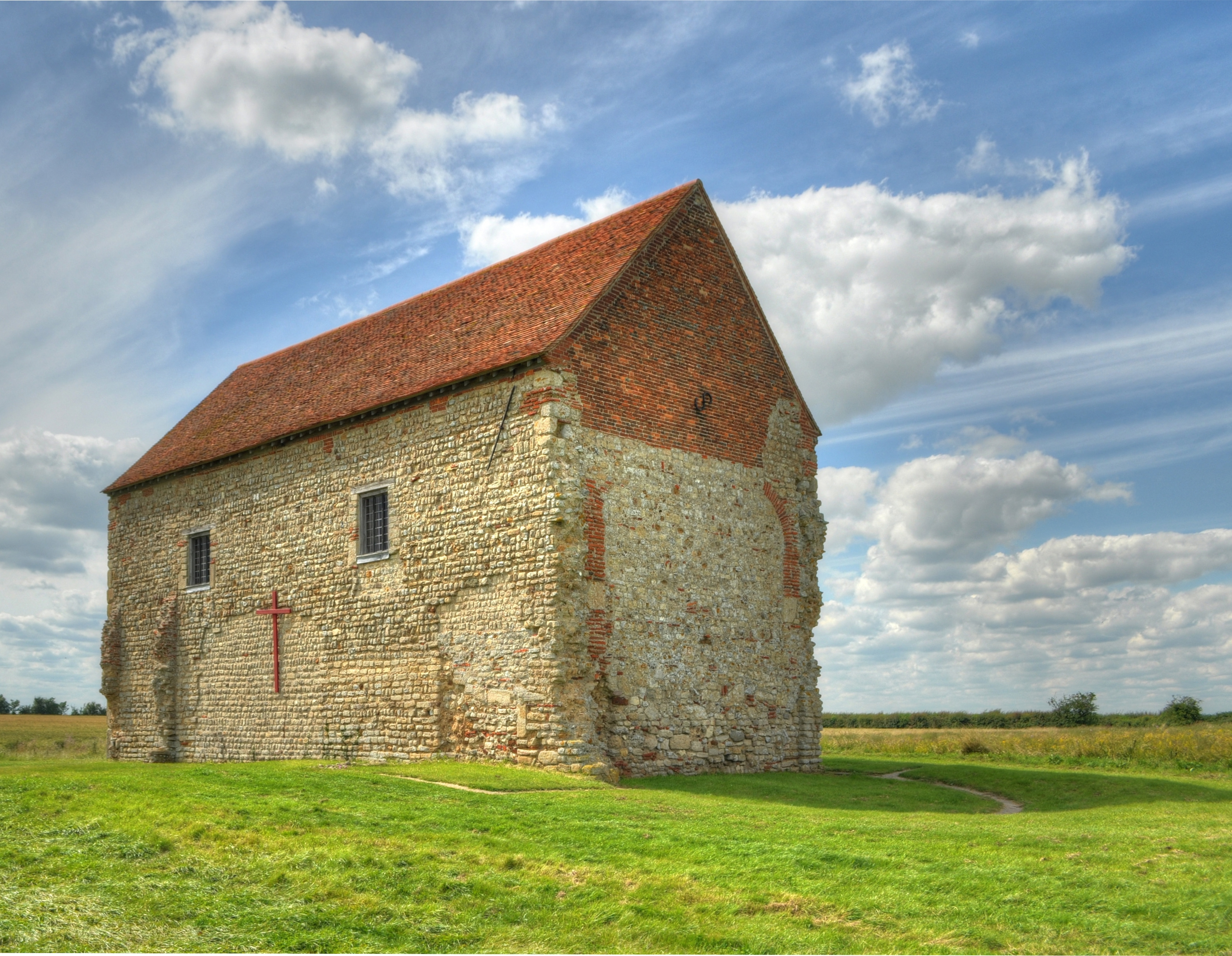
St Peter-on-the-Wall, Essex: A simple nave church of the early style c. 650

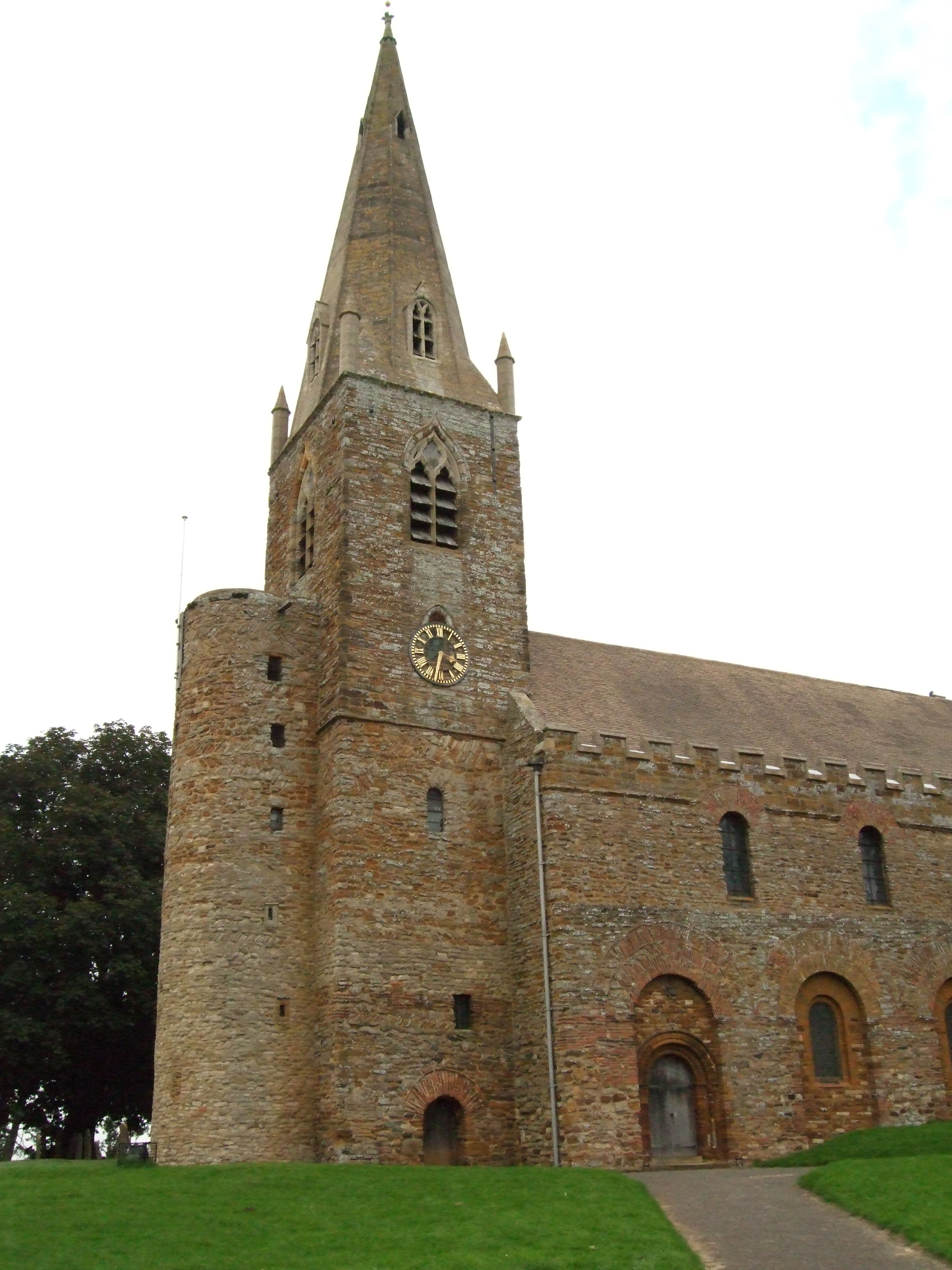
Brixworth, Northants: monastery founded c. 690, one of the largest churches to survive relatively intact

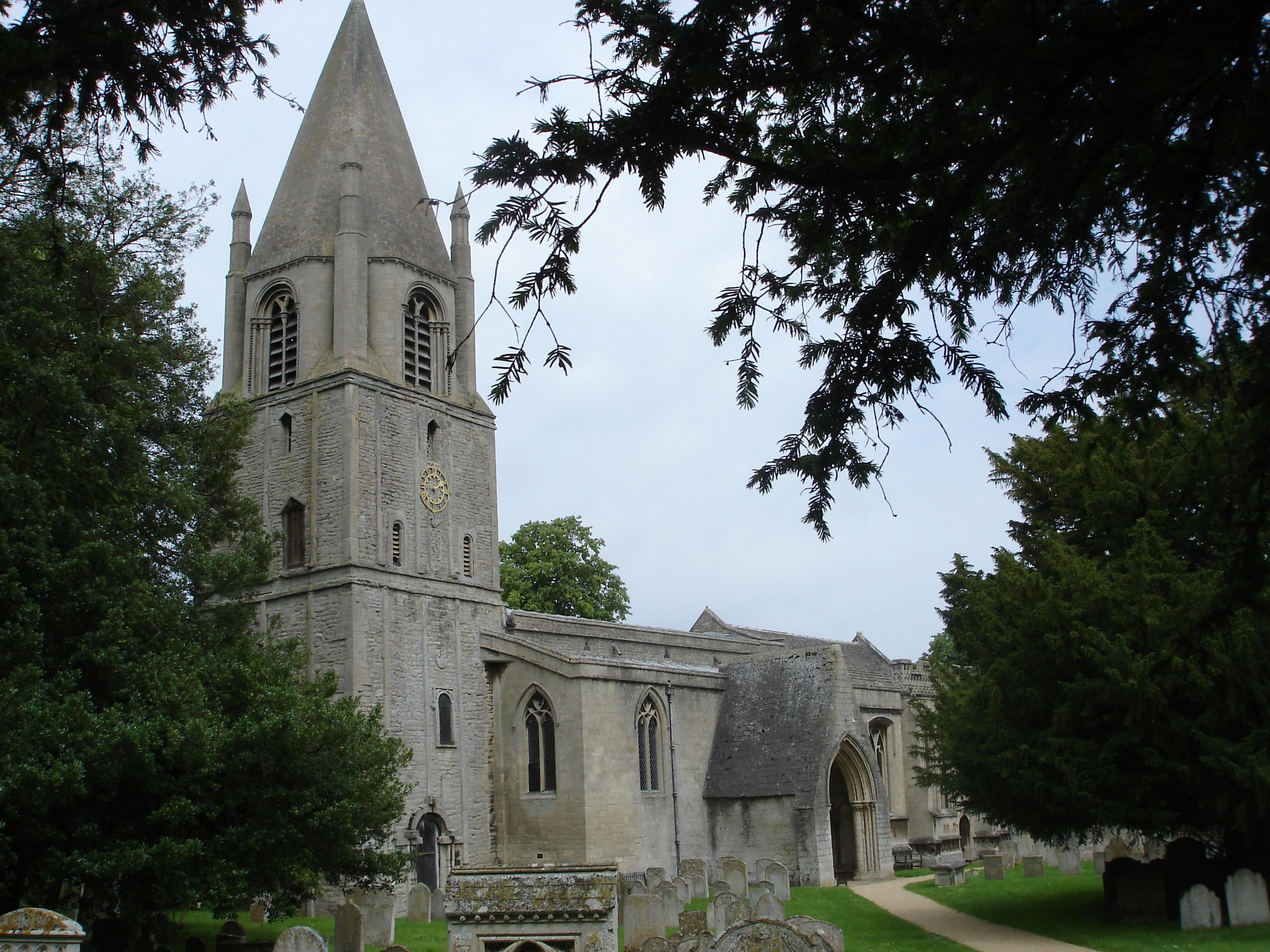
Barnack, Peterborough: Lower tower c. 970 – spire is later

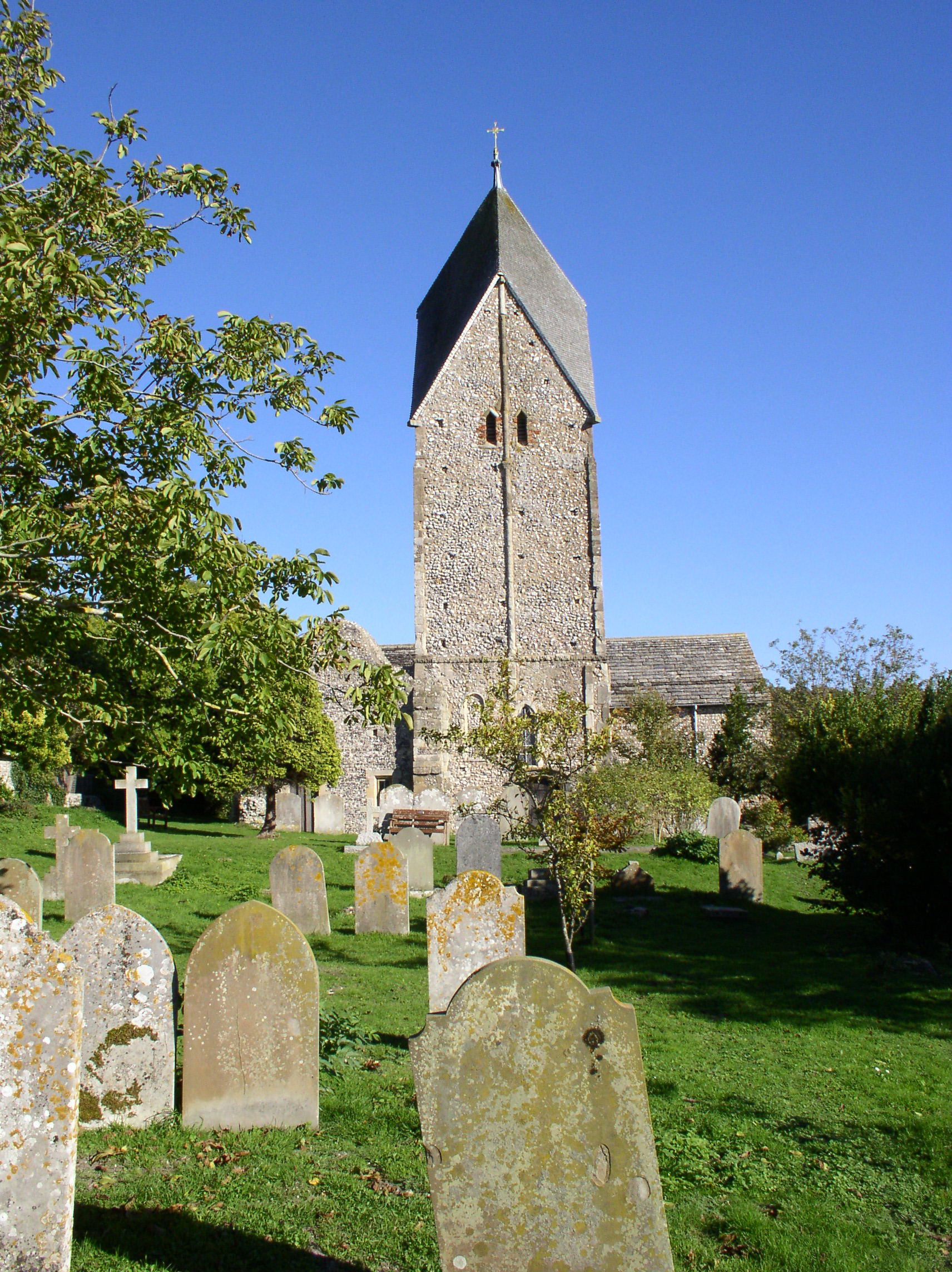
Sompting Church, Sussex, with the only Anglo-Saxon Rhenish helm tower to survive, c. 1050

=== Art ===
Early Anglo-Saxon art is seen mostly in decorated jewellery, like brooches, buckles, beads and wrist-clasps, some of outstanding quality. Characteristic of the 5th century is the quoit brooch with motifs based on crouching animals, as seen on the silver quoit brooch from Sarre, Kent. While the origins of this style are disputed, it is either an offshoot of provincial Roman, Frankish, or Jutish art. One style flourished from the late 5th century and continued throughout the 6th and is on many square-headed brooches, it is characterised by chip-carved patterns based on animals and masks. A different style, which gradually superseded it, is dominated by serpentine beasts with interlacing bodies.

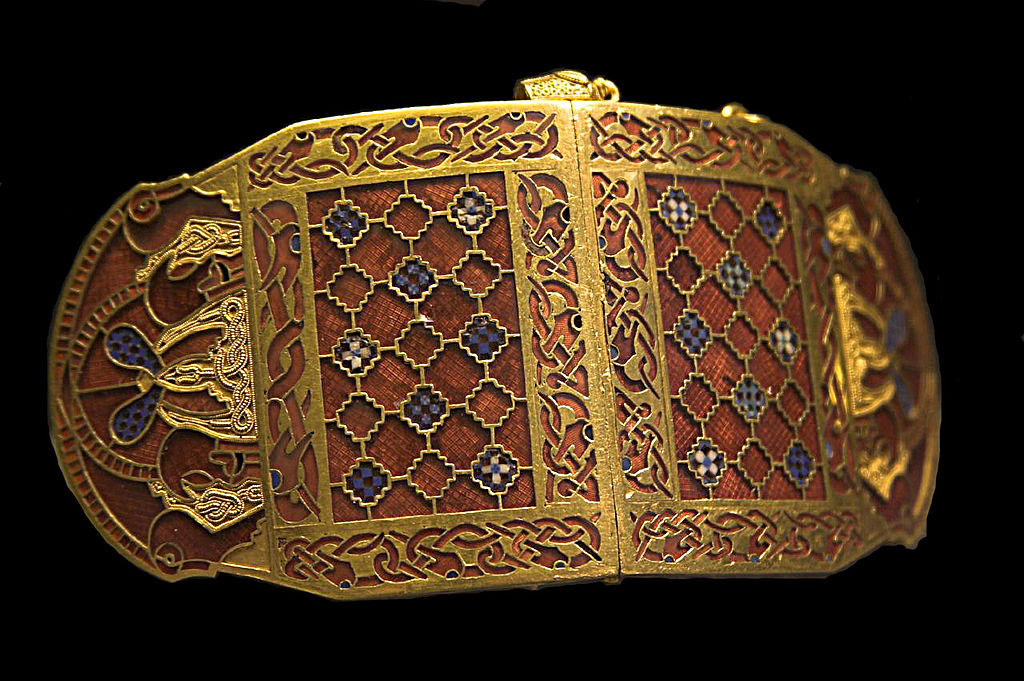
Shoulder clasp (closed) from the Sutton Hoo ship-burial 1, England. British Museum.

By the later 6th century, the best works from the south-east are distinguished by greater use of expensive materials, above all gold and garnets, reflecting the growing prosperity of a more organised society which had greater access to imported precious materials, as seen in the buckle from the Taplow burial and the jewellery from Sutton Hoo, c. 600 and c. 625 respectively. The possible symbolism of the decorative elements like interlace and beast forms that were used in these early works remains unclear. These objects were the products of a society that invested its modest surpluses in personal display, that fostered craftsmen and jewellers of a high standard, and in which the possession of a fine brooch or buckle was a valuable status symbol.

The Staffordshire Hoard is the largest hoard of Anglo-Saxon gold and silver metalwork yet found. Discovered in a field near the village of Hammerwich, it consists of over 3,500 items that are nearly all martial in character and contains no objects specific to female uses. It demonstrates that considerable quantities of high-grade goldsmiths' work were in circulation among the elite during the 7th century. It also shows that the value of such items as currency and their potential roles as tribute or the spoils of war could, in a warrior society, outweigh appreciation of their integrity and artistry.

The Christianization of the society revolutionised the visual arts, as well as other aspects of society. Art had to fulfil new functions, and whereas pagan art was abstract, Christianity required images clearly representing subjects. The transition between the Christian and pagan traditions is occasionally apparent in 7th-century works; examples include the Crundale buckle and the Canterbury pendant. In addition to fostering metalworking skills, Christianity stimulated stone sculpture and manuscript illumination. In these Germanic motifs, such as interlace and animal ornament along with Celtic spiral patterns, are juxtaposed with Christian imagery and Mediterranean decoration, notably vine-scroll. The Ruthwell Cross, Bewcastle Cross and Easby Cross are leading Northumbrian examples of the Anglo-Saxon version of the Celtic high cross, generally with a slimmer shaft.

The jamb of the doorway at Monkwearmouth, carved with a pair of lacertine beasts, probably dates from the 680s; the golden, garnet-adorned pectoral cross of St Cuthbert was presumably made before 687; while his wooden inner coffin (incised with Christ and the Evangelists' symbols, the Virgin and Child, archangels and apostles), the Lindisfarne Gospels, and the Codex Amiatinus all date from c. 700. The fact that these works are all from Northumbria might be held to reflect the particular strength of the church in that kingdom. Works from the south were more restrained in their ornamentation than are those from Northumbria.

Lindisfarne was an important centre of book production, along with Ripon and Monkwearmouth-Jarrow. The Lindisfarne Gospels might be the single most beautiful book produced in the Middle Ages, and the Echternach Gospels and (probably) the Book of Durrow are other products of Lindisfarne. A Latin gospel book, the Lindisfarne Gospels are richly illuminated and decorated in an Insular style that blends Irish and Western Mediterranean elements and incorporates imagery from the Eastern Mediterranean, including Coptic Christianity. The Codex Amiatinus was produced in the north of England at the same time and has been called the finest book in the world. It is certainly one of the largest, weighing 34 kilograms. It is a pandect, which was rare in the Middle Ages, and included all the books of the Bible in one volume. The Codex Amiatinus was produced at Monkwearmouth-Jarrow in 692 under the direction of Abbot Ceolfrith. Bede probably had something to do with it. The production of the Codex shows the riches of the north of England at this time. We have records of the monastery needing a new grant of land to raise 2,000 more cattle to get the calf skins to make the vellum for the manuscript. The Codex Amiatinus was meant to be a gift to the pope, and Ceolfrith was taking it to Rome when he died on the way. The copy ended up in Florence, where it still is today – a ninth-century copy of this book is in the possession of the pope.

Book of Cerne, evangelist portrait of Saint Mark

In the 8th century, Anglo-Saxon Christian art flourished with grand decorated manuscripts and sculptures, along with secular works which bear comparable ornament, like the Witham pins and the Coppergate helmet. The flourishing of sculpture in Mercia occurred slightly later than in Northumbria and is dated to the second half of the 8th century. The Book of Cerne is an early 9th-century Insular or Anglo-Saxon Latin personal prayer book with Old English components. This manuscript was decorated and embellished with four painted full-page miniatures, major and minor letters, and continuing panels. Further decorated motifs used in these manuscripts, such as hunched, triangular beasts, also appear on objects from the Trewhiddle hoard (buried in the 870s) and on the rings which bear the names of King Æthelwulf and Queen Æthelswith, which are the centre of a small corpus of fine ninth-century metalwork.

There was demonstrable continuity in the south, even though the Danish settlement represented a watershed in England's artistic tradition. Wars and pillaging removed or destroyed much Anglo-Saxon art, while the settlement introduced new Scandinavian craftsmen and patrons. The result was to accentuate the pre-existing distinction between the art of the north and that of the south. In the 10th and 11th centuries, the Viking dominated areas were characterised by stone sculpture in which the Anglo-Saxon tradition of cross shafts took on new forms, and a distinctive Anglo-Scandinavian monument, the 'hogback' tomb, was produced. The decorative motifs used on these northern carvings (as on items of personal adornment or everyday use) echo Scandinavian styles. The Wessexan hegemony and the monastic reform movement appear to have been the catalysts for the rebirth of art in southern England from the end of the 9th century. Here artists responded primarily to continental art; foliage supplanting interlace as the preferred decorative motif. Key early works are the Alfred Jewel, which has fleshy leaves engraved on the back plate; and the stole and maniples of Bishop Frithestan of Winchester, which are ornamented with acanthus leaves, alongside figures that bear the stamp of Byzantine art. The surviving evidence points to Winchester and Canterbury as the leading centres of manuscript art in the second half of the 10th century: they developed colourful paintings with lavish foliate borders, and coloured line drawings.

By the early 11th century, these two traditions had fused and had spread to other centres. Although manuscripts dominate the corpus, sufficient architectural sculpture, ivory carving and metalwork survives to show that the same styles were current in secular art and became widespread in the south at parochial level. The wealth of England in the later tenth and eleventh century is clearly reflected in the lavish use of gold in manuscript art as well as for vessels, textiles and statues (now known only from descriptions). Widely admired, southern English art was highly influential in Normandy, France and Flanders from c. 1000. Indeed, keen to possess it or recover its materials, the Normans appropriated it in large quantities in the wake of the Conquest. The Bayeux Tapestry, probably designed by a Canterbury artist for Bishop Odo of Bayeux, is arguably the apex of Anglo-Saxon art. Surveying nearly 600 years of continuous change, three common strands stand out: lavish colour and rich materials; an interplay between abstract ornament and representational subject matter; and a fusion of art styles reflecting English links to other parts of Europe.

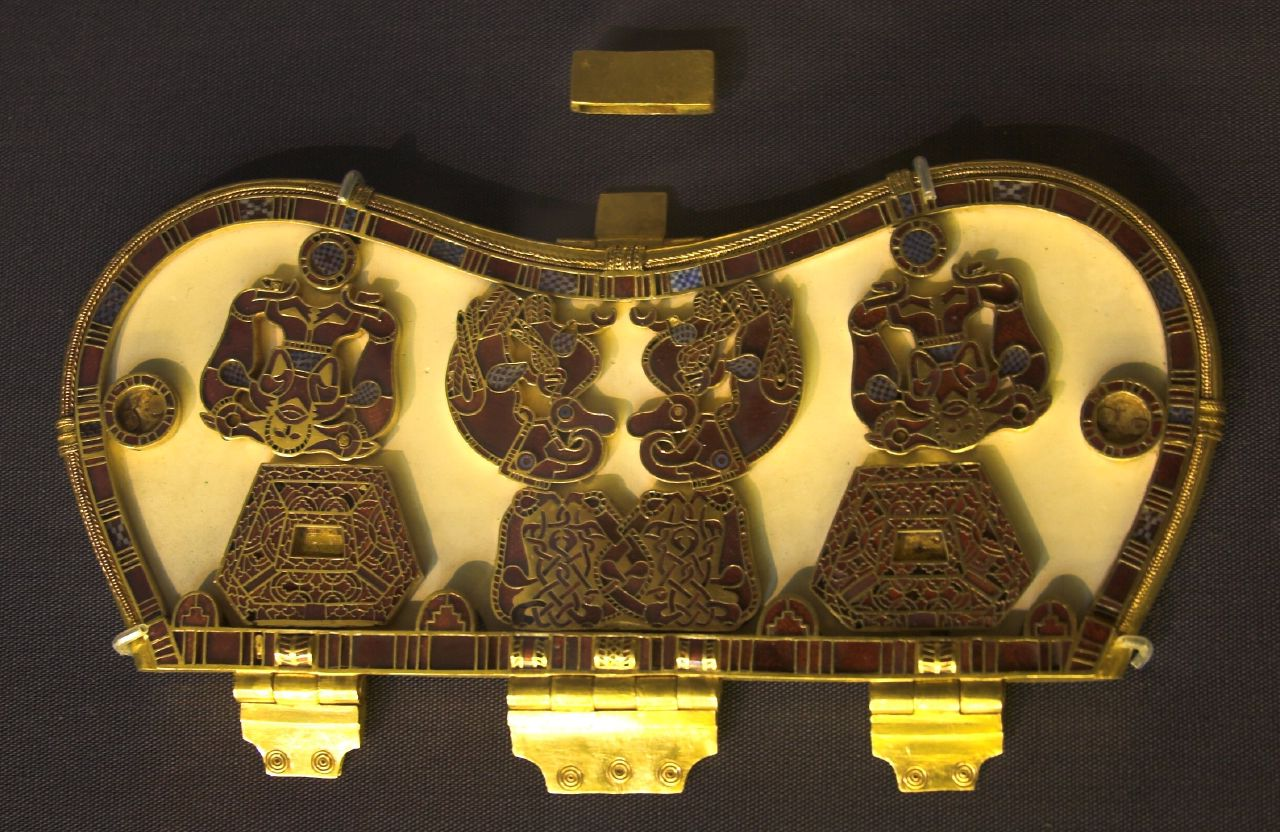
Sutton Hoo purse-lid c. 620

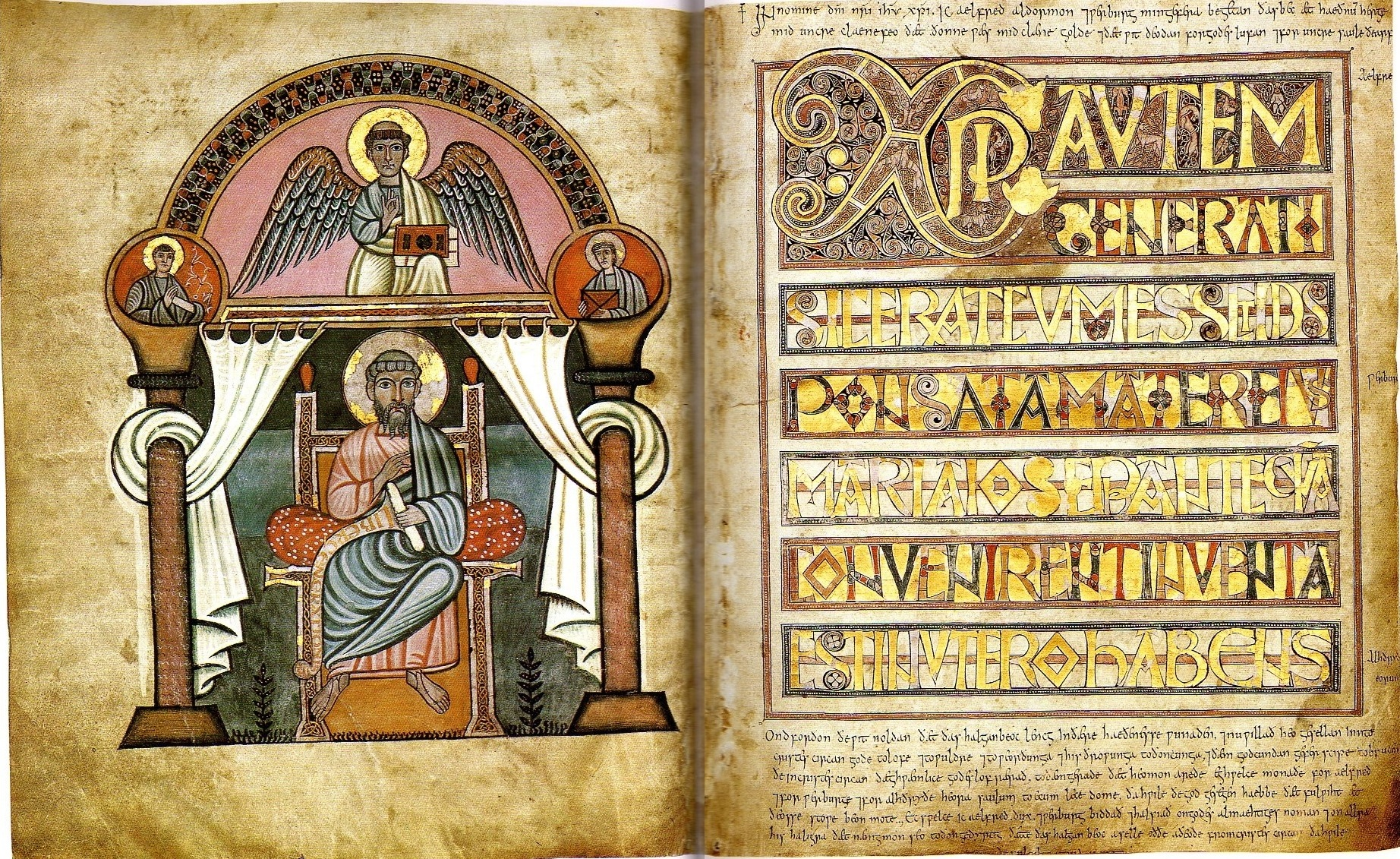
Codex Aureus of Canterbury c. 750

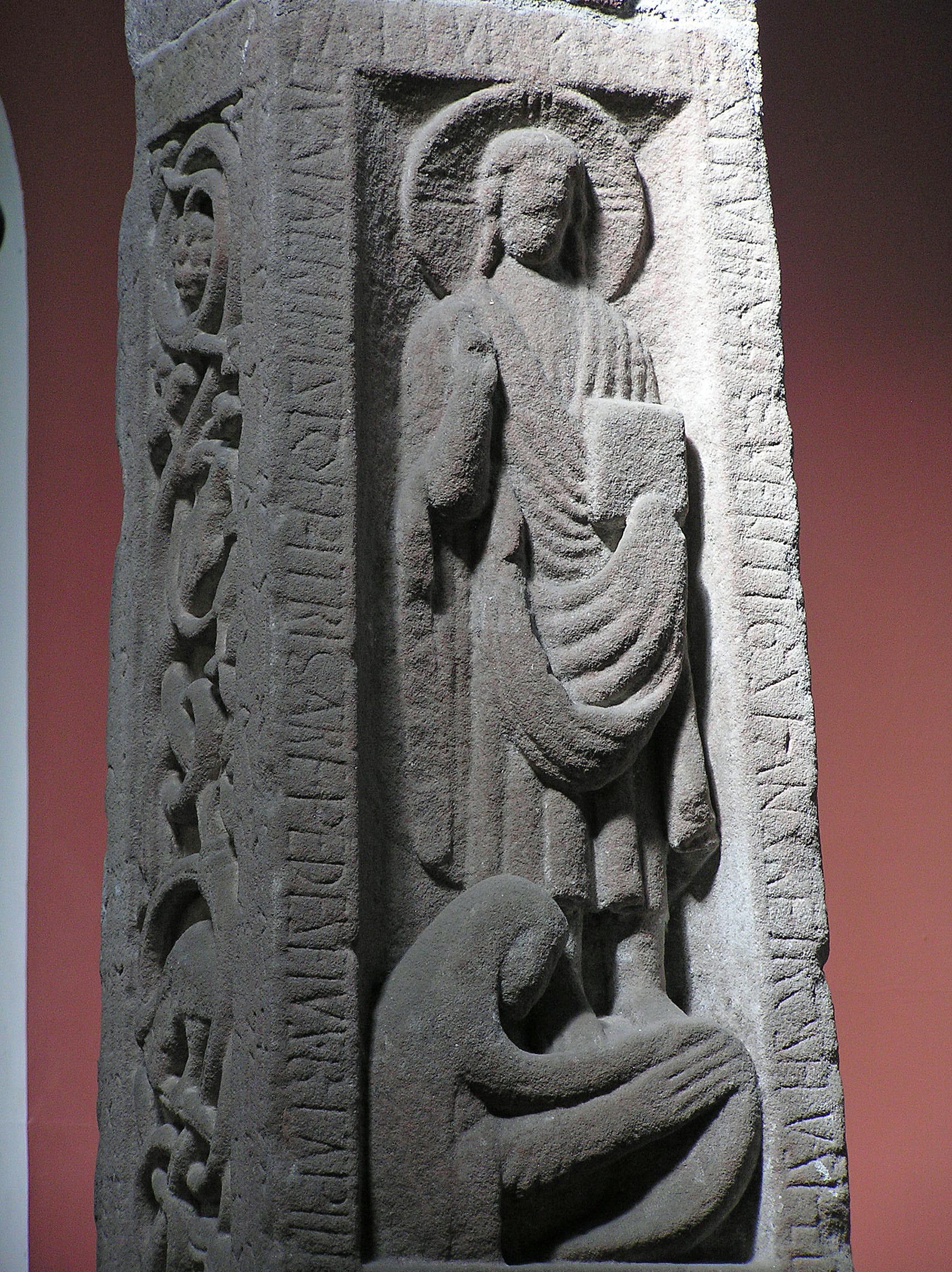
Ruthwell Cross c. 750

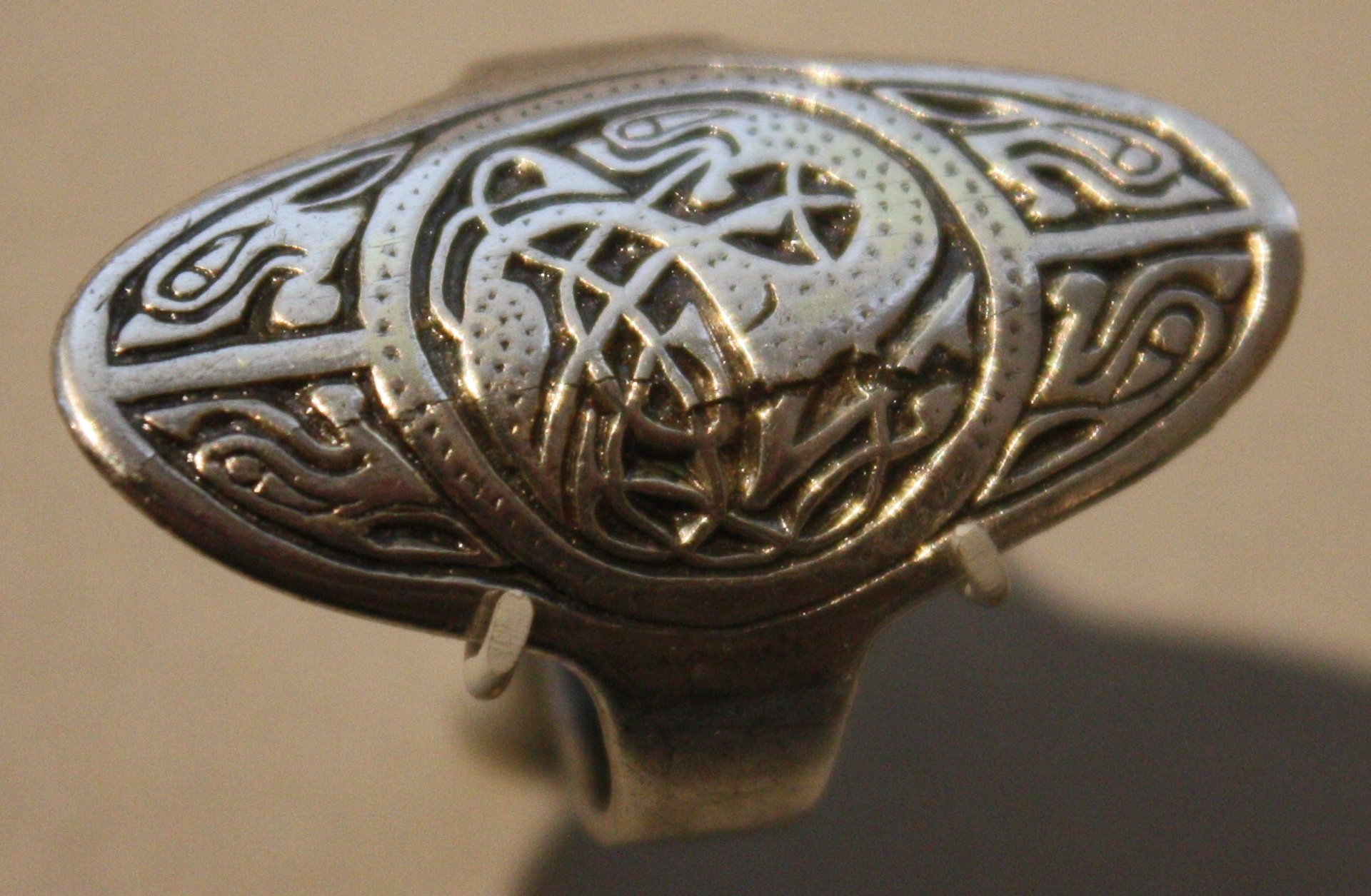
Trewhiddle style on silver ring c. 775 – c. 850

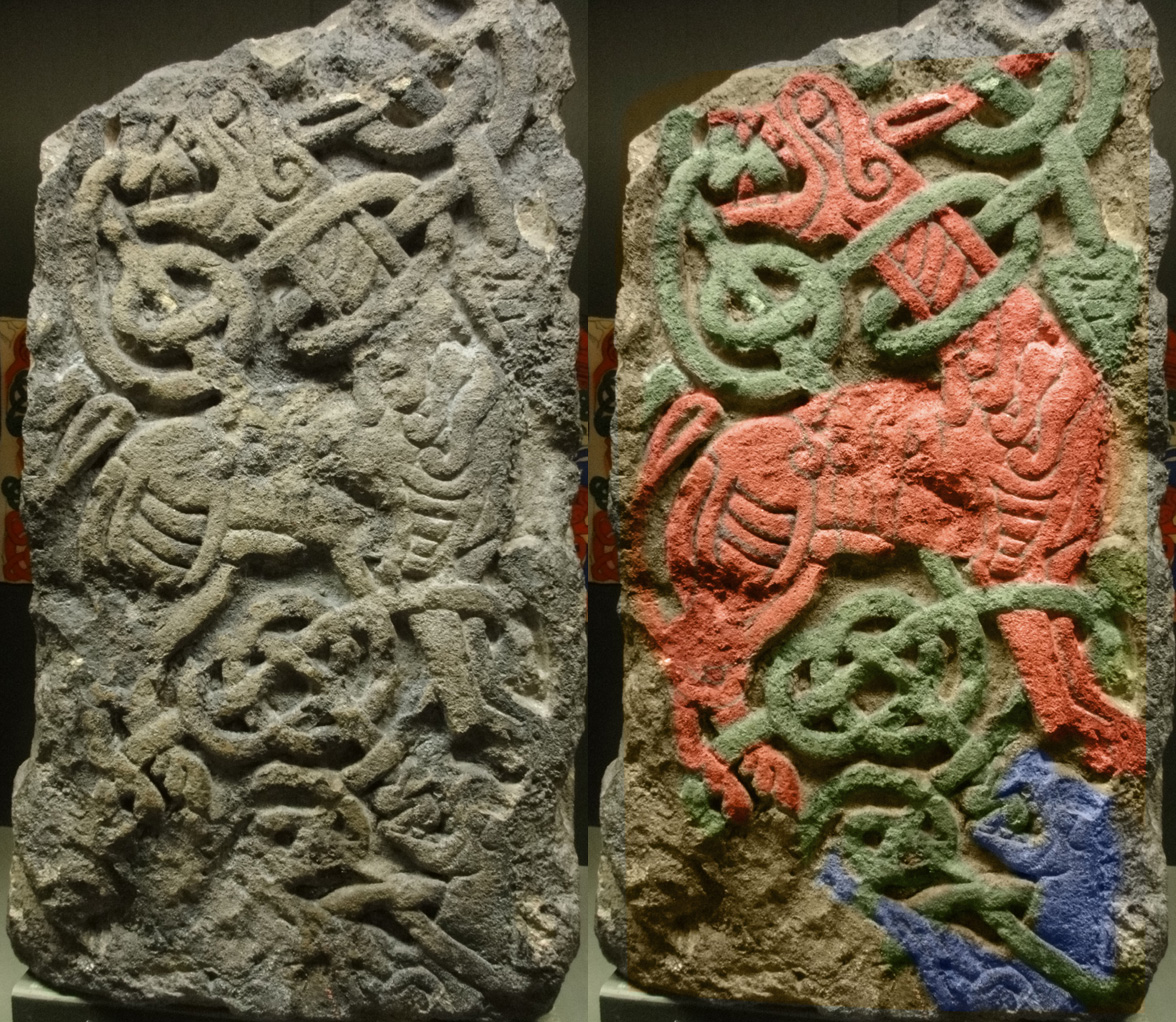
St Oswald's Priory Cross c. 890

=== Language ===
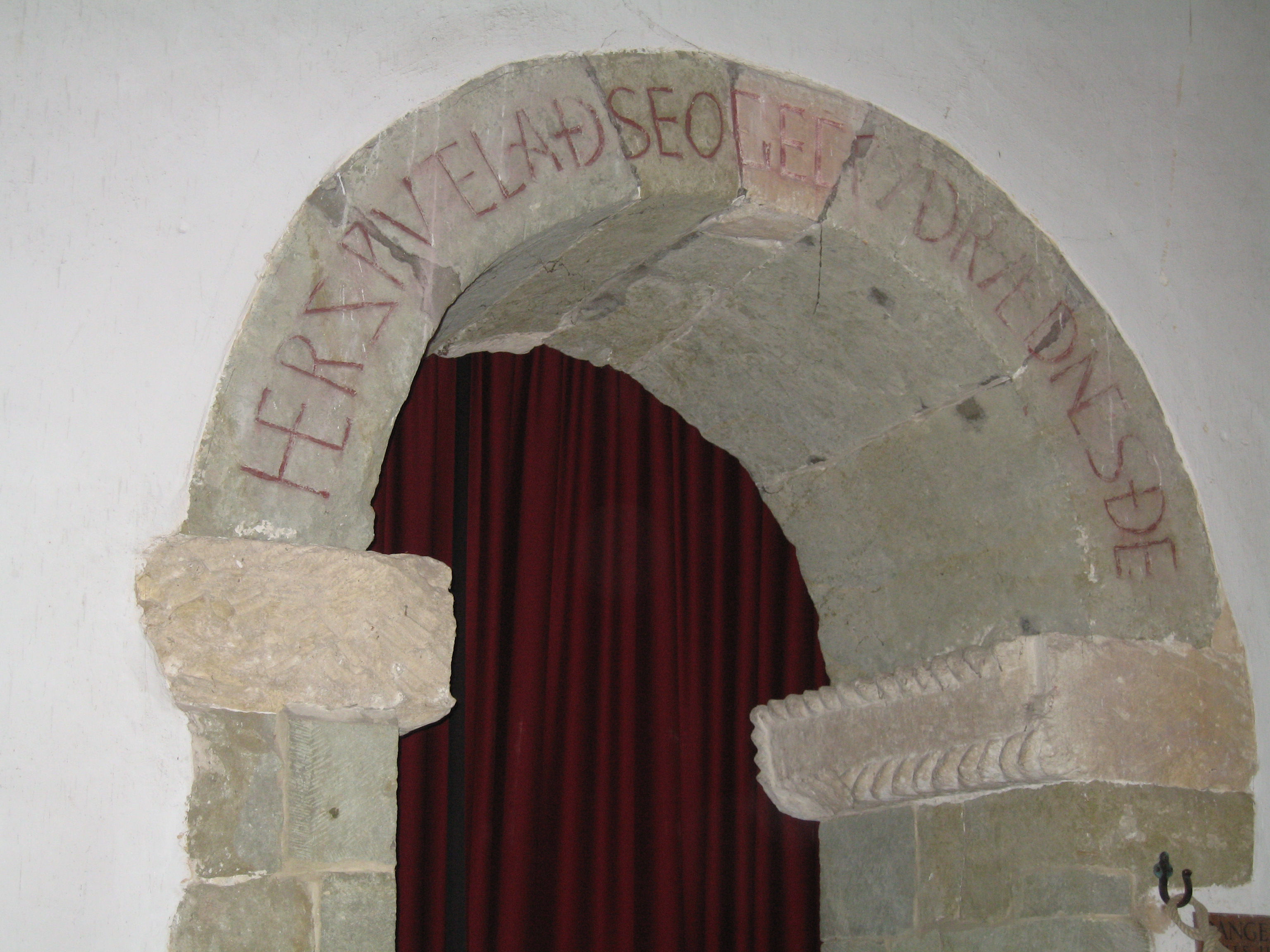
Her sƿutelað seo gecƿydrædnes ðe ('Here is manifested the Word to thee'). Unique Old English inscription over the arch of the south porticus in the 10th-century St Mary's Church, Breamore, Hampshire

Old English (Ænglisċ, Anglisċ, Englisċ) is the earliest form of the English language. It was brought to Britain by Anglo-Saxon settlers, and was spoken and written in parts of what are now England and southeastern Scotland until the mid-12th century, by which time it had evolved into Middle English. Old English was a West Germanic language, closely related to Old Frisian and Old Saxon (Old Low German). The language was fully inflected, with five grammatical cases, three grammatical numbers and three grammatical genders. Over time, Old English developed into four major dialects: Northumbrian, spoken north of the Humber; Mercian, spoken in the Midlands; Kentish, spoken in Kent; and West Saxon, spoken across the south and southwest. All of these dialects have direct descendants in modern England. Standard English developed from the Mercian dialect, as it was predominant in London.

It is generally held that Old English received little influence from the Common Brittonic and British Latin spoken in southern Britain prior to the arrival of the Anglo-Saxons, as it took in very few loan words from these languages. Though some scholars have claimed that Brittonic could have exerted an influence on English syntax and grammar, these ideas have not become consensus views, and have been criticized by other historical linguists. Richard Coates has concluded that the strongest candidates for substratal Brittonic features in English are grammatical elements occurring in regional dialects in the north and west of England, such as the Northern Subject Rule.

Old English was more clearly influenced by Old Norse. Scandinavian loan words in English include place names, items of basic vocabulary such as sky, leg and they, and words concerned with particular administrative aspects of the Danelaw (that is, the area of land under Viking control, including the East Midlands and Northumbria south of the Tees). Old Norse was related to Old English, as both originated from Proto-Germanic, and many linguists believe that the loss of inflectional endings in Old English was accelerated by contact with Norse.

=== Kinship ===
Local and extended kin groups were a key aspect of Anglo-Saxon culture. Kinship fueled societal advantages, freedom and the relationships to an elite, that allowed the Anglo-Saxons' culture and language to flourish. The ties of loyalty to a lord were to the person of a lord and not to his station; there was no real concept of patriotism or loyalty to a cause. This explains why dynasties waxed and waned so quickly, since a kingdom was only as strong as its leader-king. There was no underlying administration or bureaucracy to maintain any gains beyond the lifetime of a leader. An example of this was the leadership of Rædwald of East Anglia and how the East Anglian primacy did not survive his death. Kings could not make new laws barring exceptional circumstances. Their role instead was to uphold and clarify previous custom and to assure his subjects that he would uphold their ancient privileges, laws, and customs. Although the person of the king as a leader could be exalted, the office of kingship was not in any sense so powerful or invested with authority as it was to become. One of the tools kings used was to tie themselves closely to the new Christian church, through the practice of having a church leader anoint and crown the king; God and king were then joined in peoples' minds.

The ties of kinship meant that the relatives of a murdered person were obliged to exact vengeance for his or her death. This led to bloody and extensive feuds. As a way out of this deadly and futile custom the system of weregilds was instituted. The weregild set a monetary value on each person's life according to their wealth and social status. This value could also be used to set the fine payable if a person was injured or offended against. Robbing a thane called for a higher penalty than robbing a ceorl. On the other hand, a thane who thieved could pay a higher fine than a ceorl who did likewise. Men were willing to die for the lord and to support their comitatus (their warrior band). Evidence of this behavior (though it may be more a literary ideal than an actual social practice) can be observed in the story, made famous in the Anglo-Saxon Chronicle entry for 755, of Cynewulf and Cyneheard, in which the followers of a defeated king decided to fight to the death rather than be reconciled after the death of their lord.

This emphasis on social standing affected all parts of the Anglo-Saxon world. The courts, for example, did not attempt to discover the facts in a case; instead, in any dispute it was up to each party to get as many people as possible to swear to the rightness of their case, which became known as oath-swearing. The word of a thane counted for that of six ceorls. It was assumed that any person of good character would be able to find enough people to swear to his innocence that his case would prosper.

Anglo-Saxon society was also decidedly patriarchal, but women were in some ways better off than they would be in later times. A woman could own property in her own right. She could and did rule a kingdom if her husband died. She could not be married without her consent, and any personal goods, including lands, that she brought into a marriage remained her own property. If she were injured or abused in her marriage, her relatives were expected to look after her interests.

=== Law ===
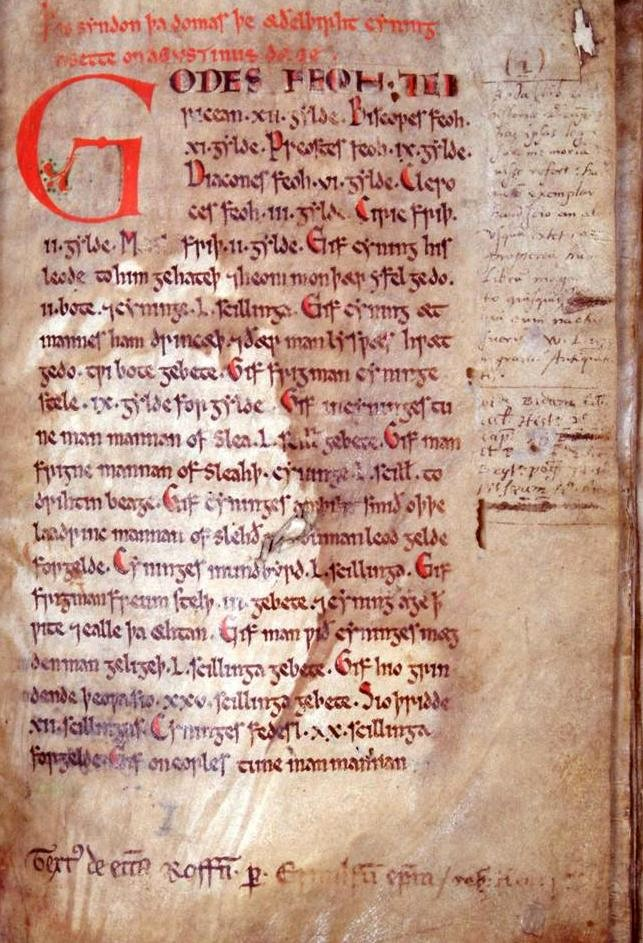
The initial page of Rochester Cathedral Library, MS A.3.5, the Textus Roffensis, which contains the only surviving copy of King Æthelberht of Kent's laws.

The most noticeable feature of the Anglo-Saxon legal system is the apparent prevalence of legislation in the form of law codes. The early Anglo-Saxons were organised in various small kingdoms often corresponding to later shires or counties. The kings of these small kingdoms issued written laws, one of the earliest of which is attributed to Ethelbert, king of Kent, ca.560–616. The Anglo-Saxon law codes follow a pattern found in mainland Europe where other groups of the former Roman Empire encountered government dependent upon written sources of law and hastened to display the claims of their own native traditions by reducing them to writing. These legal systems should not be thought of as operating like modern legislation, rather they are educational and political tools designed to demonstrate standards of good conduct rather than act as criteria for subsequent legal judgment.

Although not themselves sources of law, Anglo-Saxon charters are a most valuable historical source for tracing the actual legal practices of the various Anglo-Saxon communities. A charter was a written document from a king or other authority confirming a grant either of land or some other valuable right. Their prevalence in the Anglo-Saxon state is a sign of sophistication. They were frequently appealed to and relied upon in litigation. Making grants and confirming those made by others was a major way in which Anglo-Saxon kings demonstrated their authority.

The royal council or witan played a central but limited role in the Anglo-Saxon period. The main feature of the system was its high degree of decentralisation. The interference by the king through his granting of charters and the activity of his witan in litigation are exceptions rather than the rule in Anglo-Saxon times. The most important court in the later Anglo-Saxon period was the shire court. Many shires (such as Kent and Sussex) were in the early days of the Anglo-Saxon settlement the centre of small independent kingdoms. As the kings first of Mercia and then of Wessex slowly extended their authority over the whole of England, they left the shire courts with overall responsibility for the administration of law. The shire met in one or more traditional places, earlier in the open air and then later in a moot or meeting hall. The meeting of the shire court was presided over by an officer, the shire reeve or sheriff, whose appointment came in later Anglo-Saxon times into the hands of the king but had in earlier times been elective. The sheriff was not the judge of the court, merely its president. The judges of the court were all those who had the right and duty of attending the court, the suitors. These were originally all free male inhabitants of the neighbourhood, but over time suit of court became an obligation attached to particular holdings of land. The sessions of a shire court resembled more closely those of a modern local administrative body than a modern court. It could and did act judicially, but this was not its prime function. In the shire court, charters and writs would be read out for all to hear.

Below the level of the shire, each county was divided into areas known as hundreds (or wapentakes in the north of England). These were originally groups of families rather than geographical areas. The hundred court was a smaller version of the shire court, presided over by the hundred bailiff, formerly a sheriff's appointment, but over the years many hundreds fell into the private hands of a local large landowner. Little is known about hundred court business, which was likely a mix of the administrative and judicial, but they remained in some areas an important forum for the settlement of local disputes well into the post-Conquest period.

The Anglo-Saxon system put an emphasis upon compromise and arbitration: litigating parties were enjoined to settle their differences if possible. If they persisted in bringing a case for decision before a shire court, then it could be determined there. The suitors of the court would pronounce a judgment which fixed how the case would be decided: legal problems were considered to be too complex and difficult for mere human decision, and so proof or demonstration of the right would depend upon some irrational, non-human criterion. The normal methods of proof were oath-helping or the ordeal. Oath-helping involved the party undergoing proof swearing to the truth of his claim or denial and having that oath reinforced by five or more others, chosen either by the party or by the court. The number of helpers required and the form of their oath differed from place to place and upon the nature of the dispute. If either the party or any of the helpers failed in the oath, either refusing to take it or sometimes even making an error in the required formula, the proof failed and the case was adjudged to the other side. As "wager of law", it remained a way of determining cases in the common law until its abolition in the 19th century.

The ordeal offered an alternative for those unable or unwilling to swear an oath. The two most common methods were the ordeal by hot iron and by cold water. The former consisted in carrying a red-hot iron for five paces: the wound was immediately bound up, and if on unbinding, it was found to be festering, the case was lost. In the ordeal by water, the victim, usually an accused person, was cast bound into water: if he sunk he was innocent, if he floated he was guilty. Although for perhaps understandable reasons, the ordeals became associated with trials in criminal matters. They were in essence tests of the truth of a claim or denial of a party and appropriate for trying any legal issue. The allocation of a mode of proof and who should bear it was the substance of the shire court's judgment.

=== Literature ===
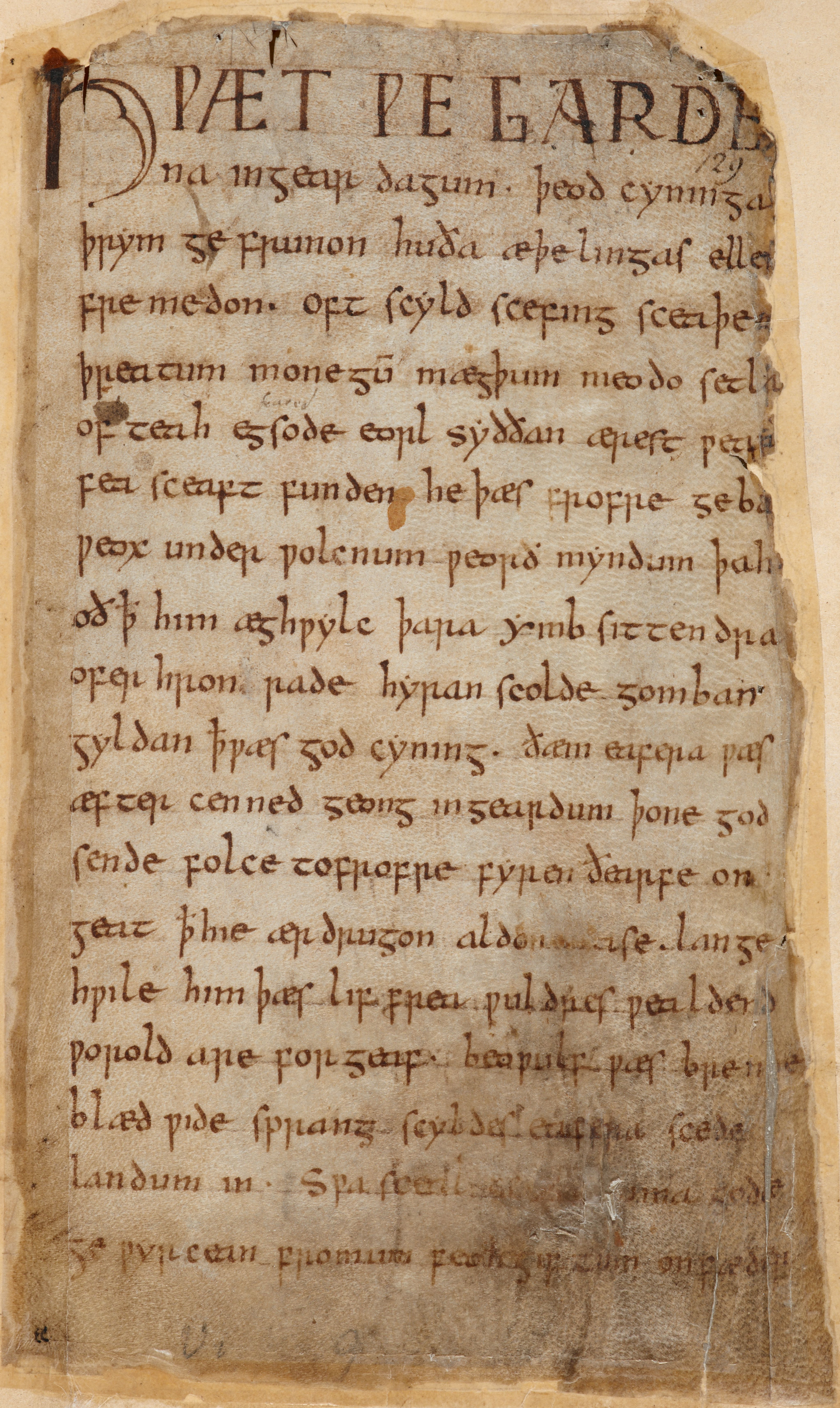
First page of the fire-damaged epic Beowulf

Old English literary works include genres such as epic poetry, hagiography, sermons, Bible translations, legal works, chronicles, riddles and others. In all there are about 400 surviving manuscripts from the period, a significant corpus of both popular interest and specialist research. The manuscripts use a modified Roman alphabet, but Anglo-Saxon runes or futhorc are used in under 200 inscriptions on objects, sometimes mixed with Roman letters.

This literature is remarkable for being in the vernacular (Old English) in the early medieval period: almost all other written literature in Western Europe was in Latin at this time, but because of Alfred's programme of vernacular literacy, the oral traditions of Anglo-Saxon England ended up being converted into writing and preserved. Much of this preservation can be attributed to the monks of the tenth century, who made – at the very least – the copies of most of the literary manuscripts that still exist. Manuscripts were not common items. They were expensive and hard to make. First, cows or sheep had to be slaughtered and their skins tanned. The leather was then scraped, stretched, and cut into sheets, which were sewn into books. Then inks had to be made from oak galls and other ingredients, and the books had to be hand written by monks using quill pens. Every manuscript is slightly different from another, even if they are copies of each other, because every scribe had different handwriting and made different errors. Individual scribes can sometimes be identified from their handwriting, and different styles of hand were used in specific scriptoria (centres of manuscript production), so the location of the manuscript production can often be identified.

There are four great poetic codices of Old English poetry (a codex is a book in modern format, as opposed to a scroll): the Junius Manuscript, the Vercelli Book, the Exeter Book, and the Nowell Codex or Beowulf Manuscript; most of the well-known lyric poems such as The Wanderer, The Seafarer, Deor and The Ruin are found in the Exeter Book, while the Vercelli Book has the Dream of the Rood, some of which is also carved on the Ruthwell Cross. The Franks Casket also has carved riddles, a popular form with the Anglo-Saxons. Old English secular poetry is mostly characterized by a somewhat gloomy and introspective cast of mind, and the grim determination found in The Battle of Maldon, recounting an action against the Vikings in 991. This is from a book that was lost in the Cotton Library fire of 1731, but it had been transcribed previously.

Rather than being organized around rhyme, the poetic line in Anglo-Saxon is organised around alliteration, the repetition of stressed sounds; any repeated stressed sound, vowel or consonant, could be used. Anglo-Saxon lines are made up of two half-lines (in old-fashioned scholarship, these are called hemistiches) divided by a breath-pause or caesura. There must be at least one of the alliterating sounds on each side of the caesura.

hreran mid hondum hrimcealde sæ (Note: Example from the Wanderer)

The line above illustrates the principle: note that there is a natural pause after 'hondum' and that the first stressed syllable after that pause begins with the same sound as a stressed line from the first half-line (the first halfline is called the a-verse and the second is the b-verse).

There is very strong evidence that Anglo-Saxon poetry has deep roots in oral tradition, but keeping with the cultural practices seen elsewhere in Anglo-Saxon culture, there was a blending between tradition and new learning. Thus while all Old English poetry has common features, three strands can be identified: religious poetry, which includes poems about specifically Christian topics, such as the cross and the saints; Heroic or epic poetry, such as Beowulf, which is about heroes, warfare, monsters, and the Germanic past; and poetry about "smaller" topics, including introspective poems (the so-called elegies), "wisdom" poems (which communicate both traditional and Christian wisdom), and riddles. For a long time all Anglo-Saxon poetry was divided into three groups: Cædmonian (the biblical paraphrase poems), heroic, and "Cynewulfian", named after Cynewulf, one of the few named poets in Anglo-Saxon. The most famous works from this period include the epic poem Beowulf, which has achieved national epic status in Britain.

There are about 30,000 surviving lines of Old English poetry and about ten times that much prose, and the majority of both is religious. The prose was influential and obviously very important to the Anglo-Saxons and more important than the poetry to those who came after the Anglo-Saxons. Homilies are sermons, lessons to be given on moral and doctrinal matters, and the two most prolific and respected writers of Anglo-Saxon prose, Ælfric and Wulfstan, were both homilists. Almost all surviving poetry is found in only one manuscript copy, but there are several versions of some prose works, especially the Anglo-Saxon Chronicle, which was apparently promulgated to monasteries by the royal court. Anglo-Saxon clergy also continued to write in Latin, the language of Bede's works, monastic chronicles, and theological writing, although Bede's biographer records that he was familiar with Old English poetry and gives a five line lyric which he either wrote or liked to quote – the sense is unclear.

=== Symbolism ===
Symbolism was an essential element in Anglo-Saxon culture. Julian D. Richards suggests that in societies with strong oral traditions, material culture is used to store and pass on information and stand instead of literature in those cultures. This symbolism is less logical than literature and more difficult to read. Anglo-Saxons used symbolism to communicate as well as to aid their thinking about the world. Anglo-Saxons used symbols to differentiate between groups and people, status and role in society.

The visual riddles and ambiguities of early Anglo-Saxon animal art, for example, has been seen as emphasising the protective roles of animals on dress accessories, weapons, armour and horse equipment, and its evocation of pre-Christian mythological themes. However Howard Williams and Ruth Nugent have suggested that the number of artefact categories that have animals or eyes—from pots to combs, buckets to weaponry—was to make artefacts 'see' by impressing and punching circular and lentoid shapes onto them. This symbolism of making the object seems to be more than decoration.

Conventional interpretations of the symbolism of grave goods revolved around religion (equipment for the hereafter), legal concepts (inalienable possessions) and social structure (status display, ostentatious destruction of wealth). There was multiplicity of messages and variability of meanings characterised the deposition of objects in Anglo-Saxon graves. In Early Anglo-Saxon cemeteries, 47% of male adults and 9% of all juveniles were buried with weapons. The proportion of adult weapon burials is much too high to suggest that they all represent a social elite. The usual assumption is that these are 'warrior burials', and this term is used throughout the archaeological and historical literature. However, a systematic comparison of burials with and without weapons, using archaeological and skeletal data, suggests that this assumption is much too simplistic and even misleading. Anglo-Saxon weapon burial rite involved a complex ritual symbolism: it was multi-dimensional, displaying ethnic affiliation, descent, wealth, élite status, and age groups. This symbol continued until c.700 when it ceased to have the symbolic power that it had before. Heinrich Härke suggests this change was the result of the changing structure of society and especially in ethnicity and assimilation, implying the lowering of ethnic boundaries in the Anglo-Saxon settlement areas of England towards a common culture.

The word bead comes from the Anglo-Saxon words bidden (to pray) and bede (prayer). The vast majority of early Anglo-Saxon female graves contain beads, which are often found in large numbers in the area of the neck and chest. Beads are sometimes found in male burials, with large beads often associated with prestigious weapons. A variety of materials other than glass were available for Anglo-Saxon beads, including amber, rock crystal, amethyst, bone, shells, coral and even metal. These beads are usually considered to have a social or ritual function. Anglo-Saxon glass beads show a wide variety of bead manufacturing techniques, sizes, shapes, colours and decorations. Various studies have been carried out investigating the distribution and chronological change of bead types. The crystal beads which appear on bead strings in the pagan Anglo-Saxon period seems to have gone through various changes in meaning in the Christian period, which Gale Owen-Crocker suggests was linked to symbolism of the Virgin Mary, and hence to intercession. John Hines has suggested that the over 2,000 different types of beads found at Lakenheath show that the beads symbolise identity, roles, status and micro cultures within the tribal landscape of the early Anglo-Saxon world.

Symbolism continued to have a hold on the minds of Anglo-Saxon people into the Christian eras. The interiors of churches would have glowed with colour, and the walls of the halls were painted with decorative scenes from the imagination telling stories of monsters and heroes like those in the poem Beowulf. Although nothing much is left of the wall paintings, evidence of their pictorial art is found in Bibles and Psalters, in illuminated manuscripts. The poem The Dream of the Rood is an example how symbolism of trees was fused into Christian symbolism. Richard North suggests that the sacrifice of the tree was in accordance with pagan virtues and "the image of Christ's death was constructed in this poem with reference to an Anglian ideology of the world tree". North suggests that the author of The Dream of the Rood "uses the language of the myth of Ingui in order to present the Passion to his newly Christianized countrymen as a story from their native tradition". Furthermore, the tree's triumph over death is celebrated by adorning the cross with gold and jewels.

The most distinctive feature of coinage of the first half of the 8th century is its portrayal of animals, to an extent found in no other European coinage of the Early Middle Ages. Some animals, such as lions or peacocks, would have been known in England only through descriptions in texts or through images in manuscripts or on portable objects. The animals were not merely illustrated out of an interest in the natural world. Each was imbued with meanings and acted as a symbol which would have been understood at the time.

=== Food ===
The food eaten by Anglo-Saxons was long presumed to differ between elites and commoners. However, a 2022 study by the University of Cambridge found that Anglo-Saxon elites and royalty both ate a primarily vegetarian diet based on cereal grains as did peasants. The discovery came after bioarchaeologist Sam Leggett analysed chemical dietary signatures from the bones of 2,023 people buried in England between the 5th to 11th Centuries and cross referenced the analysis with markers of social status. Rather than elites eating regular banquets with huge quantities of meat, the researchers concluded these were occasional grand feasts hosted by the peasants for their rulers rather than regular occurrences.

== Legacy ==
Anglo-Saxon is still used as a term for the original Old English-derived vocabulary within the modern English language, in contrast to vocabulary derived from Old Norse and French. In the 19th century, the term Anglo-Saxon was broadly used in philology, and is sometimes so used at present, though the term 'Old English' is more commonly used for the language.

Throughout the history of Anglo-Saxon studies, different historical narratives about the post Roman people of Britain and Ireland have been used to justify contemporary ideologies. In the early Middle Ages, the views of Geoffrey of Monmouth, best known for Historia Regum Britanniae which helped popularise the legend of King Arthur, produced a personally inspired (and largely fictitious) history that was not challenged for some 500 years. In the Reformation, Christians looking to establish an independent English church reinterpreted Anglo-Saxon Christianity.

During the Victorian era, writers such as Robert Knox, James Anthony Froude, Charles Kingsley and Edward A. Freeman used the term Anglo-Saxon to justify colonialistic imperialism, claiming that Anglo-Saxon heritage was superior to those held by colonised peoples, which justified efforts to "civilise" them. Similar racist ideas were advocated in the 19th-century United States by Samuel George Morton and George Fitzhugh. The historian Catherine Hills contends that these views have influenced how versions of early English history are embedded in the sub-conscious of certain people and are "re-emerging in school textbooks and television programmes and still very congenial to some strands of political thinking."

The term Anglo-Saxon is sometimes used to refer to a broader group of peoples descended or associated in some way with the English ethnic group, in ways which go beyond language, and often involve ideas about religion. In contemporary Anglophone cultures outside Britain for example, "Anglo-Saxon" ancestry and culture is sometimes contrasted with Irish ancestry and culture, which was once subject to negative stereotyping and bigotry. "White Anglo-Saxon Protestant" (WASP) is a derogatory term especially popular in the United States that refers chiefly to long-established wealthy families with mostly English, but also sometimes Scottish, Dutch or German ancestors. As such, WASP is not a historical label or a precise ethnological term but rather a reference to contemporary family-based political, financial and cultural power, e.g. The Boston Brahmin.

The term Anglo-Saxon is becoming increasingly controversial among some scholars, especially those in America, for its modern politicised nature and adoption by the far-right. In 2019, the International Society of Anglo-Saxonists changed their name to the International Society for the Study of Early Medieval England, in recognition of this controversy.

The Russian government under Vladimir Putin and Russian state-run media often use "Anglo-Saxon" as a derogatory term referring to English-speaking countries, particularly the United States and United Kingdom. According to the BBC, the UK and US are especially referred to by the term because they are perceived as "particularly die-hard adversaries of Russia."

== See also ==
- Anglo-Celtic
- Anglo-Normans
- Anglo-Frisian languages
- Anglo-Saxon model
- Burial in Anglo-Saxon England
- Frisia
- Fyrd - Anglo-Saxon military organization
- States in Medieval Britain
- Timeline of conflict in Anglo-Saxon Britain

== Citations ==
=== Sources ===
- Campbell, James, ed. (1982). The Anglo-Saxons. London: Penguin. ISBN 978-0-140-14395-9.
- Giles, John Allen, ed. (1843), "Ecclesiastical History, Books I, II and III", The Miscellaneous Works of Venerable Bede, vol. II, London: Whittaker and Co.
- Giles, John Allen, ed. (1843), "Ecclesiastical History, Books IV and V", The Miscellaneous Works of Venerable Bede, vol. III, London: Whittaker and Co.
- Halsall, Guy (2013). Worlds of Arthur: Facts & Fictions of the Dark Ages. Oxford University Press. ISBN 978-0-19-870084-5.
- Higham, Nicholas J.; Ryan, Martin J. (2013), The Anglo-Saxon World, Yale University Press, ISBN 978-0-300-12534-4
- Hills, Catherine (2003), Origins of the English, London: Duckworth, ISBN 978-0-7156-3191-1
- Hough, Carole (2014). "An Ald Reht": Essays on Anglo-Saxon Law. Cambridge Scholars Publishing. ISBN 978-1-4438-5917-2.
- Leahy, Kevin; Bland, Roger (2009), The Staffordshire Hoard, British Museum Press, ISBN 978-0-7141-2328-8
- Lanting; van der Plicht (2010). "De ^{14}C-chronologie van de Nederlandse Pre- en Protohistorie. VI: Romeinse tijd en Merovingische periode, deel A: historische bronnen en chronologische schema's". Palaeohistoria. 51–52: 67. ISBN 978-90-77922-73-6.
- Martin, Kevin M. (1971). "Some Textual Evidence Concerning the Continental Origins of the Invaders of Britain in the Fifth Century". Latomus. 30 (1): 83–104. JSTOR 41527856.
- Nixon, C E V; Rodgers, Barbara Saylor (1994). In praise of later Roman emperors: the Panegyrici Latini. Berkeley: University of California Press. ISBN 0-520-08326-1 – via Internet Archive.
- Springer, Matthias (2004). Die Sachsen (in German). Kohlhammer Verlag. ISBN 978-3-17-023227-3.
- Stenton, Frank (1971) [1943]. Anglo-Saxon England (3rd ed.). Oxford, UK: Oxford University Press. ISBN 978-0-19-280139-5.
- Yorke, Barbara (1990), Kings and Kingdoms of Early Anglo-Saxon England, B. A. Seaby, ISBN 978-0-415-16639-3
