= Breamore =

Village and parish in Hampshire, England

Coordinates: 50°57′41″N 1°46′33″W

- Location within Hampshire
- Population: 363; 364 (2011 Census)
- OS grid reference: SU158180
- Civil parish: Breamore
- District: New Forest
- Shire county: Hampshire
- Region: South East
- Country: England
- Sovereign state: United Kingdom
- Post town: FORDINGBRIDGE
- Postcode district: SP6
- Dialling code: 01725
- Police: Hampshire and Isle of Wight
- Fire: Hampshire and Isle of Wight
- Ambulance: South Central
- UK Parliament: New Forest West
- Website: Breamore Parish Council

Breamore (/ˈbrɛmər/ BREM-ər) is a village and civil parish near Fordingbridge in Hampshire, England.

The parish includes a notable Elizabethan country house, Breamore House, built with an E-shaped ground plan.

The Church of England parish church of Saint Mary has an Anglo-Saxon rood.

== Overview ==
The village of Breamore is mainly situated along the A338 road between Fordingbridge and Downton, although the Saxon church and Breamore House are about three-quarters mile (1.2 km) west of the road.

Within the Parish is the Marsh (an important surviving manorial green) and the River Avon: both are listed as Sites of Special Scientific Interest.

Other parts of the Parish fall within the Cranborne Chase and West Wiltshire Downs Area of Outstanding Natural Beauty.

== History ==
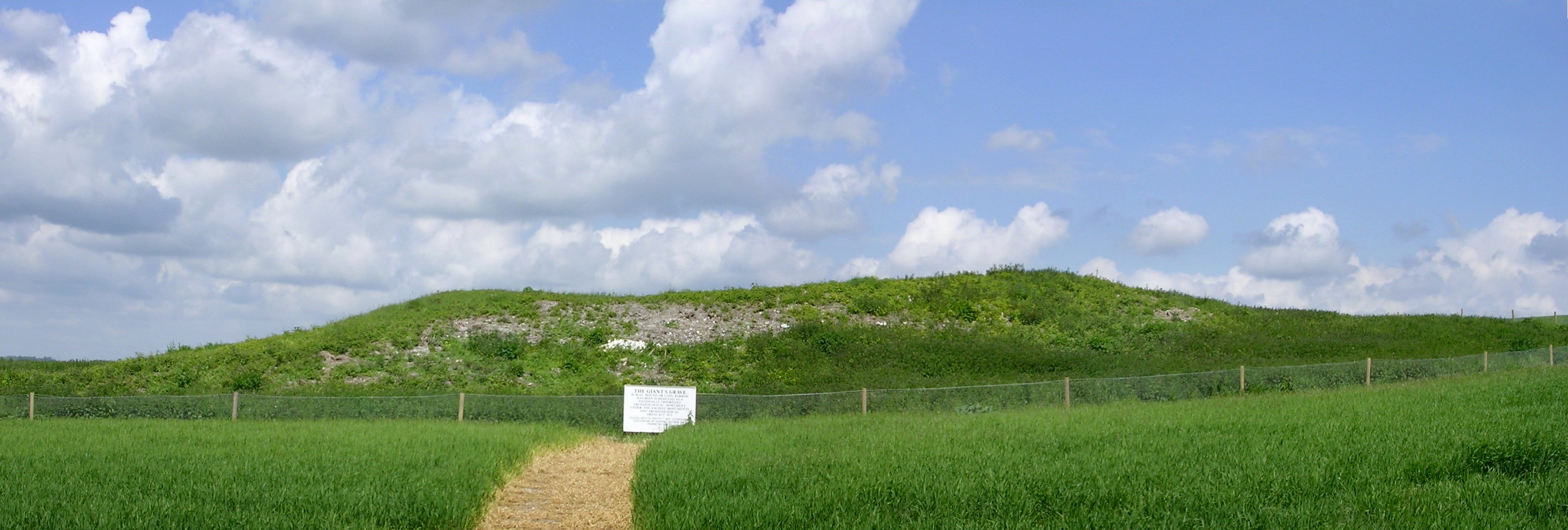
Giants Grave long barrow NW of Breamore Village

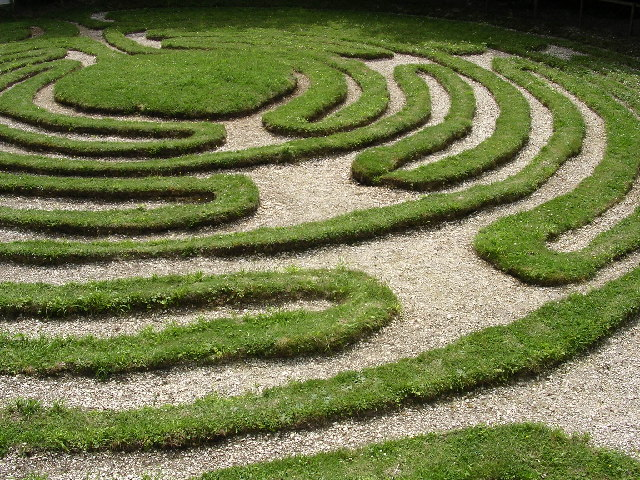
The "Mizmaze" northwest of Breamore village

Breamore Down northwest of the village has several Bronze Age bowl barrows. There is also a long barrow known as the Giant's Grave, originally 65 m long and 26 m wide with flanked ditches, it is now partly damaged. Breamore Down also has a mysterious mizmaze on its heights. Argument rages as to whether the Bronze Age people or mediaeval monks were responsible for these patterns cut in the turf.

The name Breamore, recorded as Brumore in 1086, may be derived from Old English "Brommor" meaning "broom(covered) marsh". At an early date the manor of Breamore belonged to the Crown, and in 1086 was part of the royal manor of Rockbourne.

At an early date, probably by grant of Henry I, Breamore passed to the Earls of Devon, lords of the Isle of Wight, who held it from the king in chief. In 1299, Edward I assigned it to his consort, Margaret of France, but in 1302 Breamore was delivered to Hugh de Courtenay. From that time, it descended with the Earls of Devon until it was granted, in 1467, to Walter Blount, 1st Baron Mountjoy.

In 1475, Breamore escheated to the king, who granted it for life in 1490 to Sir Hugh Conway and Elizabeth his wife. In 1512, it was granted to Catherine of York, widow of William Courtenay, 1st Earl of Devon and her heirs. Her son Henry was created Marquess of Exeter in 1525, but was beheaded in 1538–9, when the manor again passed to the Crown.

The manor was granted in 1541 to the queen consort, Catherine Howard, and in 1544 to Catherine Parr, who, after the death of Henry VIII, married Thomas Seymour, 1st Baron Seymour of Sudeley, to whom Breamore was granted by Edward VI in 1547. On his execution in 1549 it again passed to the Crown and was granted in 1579 by Elizabeth I to Christopher Hatton. William Dodington purchased from him and died in 1600 leaving a son and heir Sir William. From this date Breamore followed the descent of South Charford until 1741, when Francis Lord Brooke sold it to Samuel Dixon, preliminary to its sale to Sir Edward Hulse.

Breamore railway station opened in 1866. It was served by the Salisbury and Dorset Junction Railway, a line running north–south along the River Avon, connecting Salisbury to the North and Poole to the South. It closed in 1964, the disused station still exists on the road that leads east from the A338.

== St Mary's Church ==
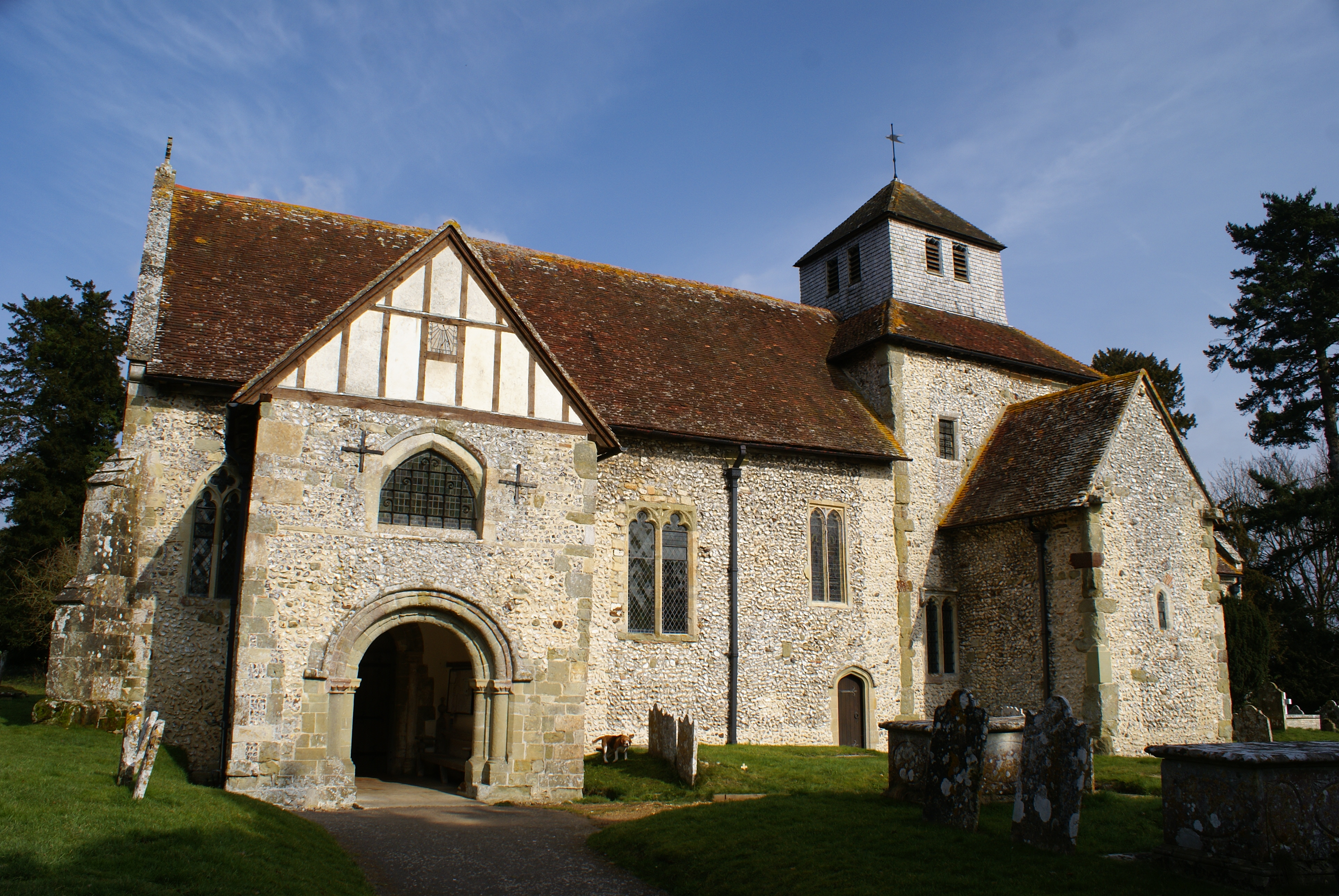
St Mary's church Breamore

The church of Saint Mary is an almost complete example of an Anglo-Saxon church. The building consists of a chancel and aisleless nave separated by square central tower. Seven "double-splayed" Saxon windows remain, and there is a "leper window" in the north wall. Instead of having full transepts, the building was flanked by narrow porticus, of which that to the north has been destroyed.. There is an Anglo Saxon inscription dating from the reign of Æthelred the Unready in the arch to the south porticus, and a badly mutilated Saxon rood with figures of Our Lady and Saint John.

The east window with reticulated tracery dates from 1340. The chancel arch and arch in west wall of the tower are 15th century. The tower houses four bells cast in late 16th and early 17th centuries.

== Breamore Priory ==
The priory of Breamore was founded towards the end of the reign of Henry I by Baldwin de Redvers and Hugh his uncle, to whose descendants the advowson belonged. It was apparently visited by Richard II in 1384. Baldwin and Hugh de Redvers endowed their priory of Breamore with certain land in Breamore which formed the nucleus of the manor later known as Breamore Bulborn. Various donors added gifts of adjoining land which were merged in the manor.

On the dissolution of the priory in July 1536 the site was granted in November of that year with the manors of Breamore and Bulborn to Henry Courtenay, 1st Marquess of Exeter and his wife Gertrude. It then followed the descent of Breamore Bulborn, becoming merged in that manor.

== Breamore House ==
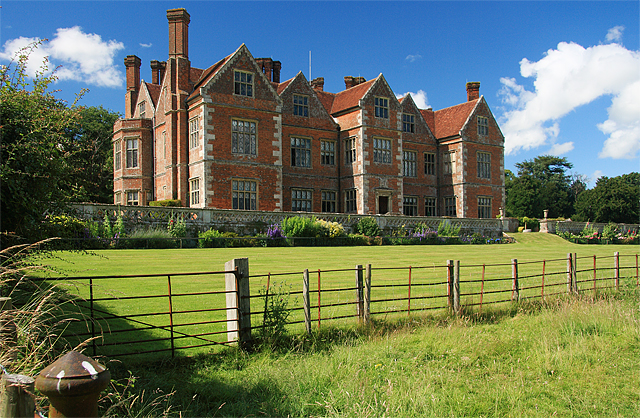
Breamore House NW of Village

Breamore House stands northwest of the church. The original house was a very fine late 16th-century building of brick and stone.

It suffered from a fire in 1856, but was restored on the old lines.

This incorporated such of the old masonry as was left, and now still resembles an Elizabethan building.

== Breamore stocks ==
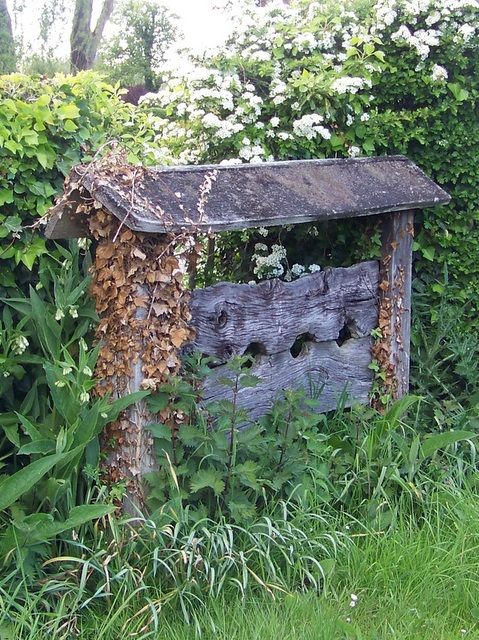
Breamore village stocks

The village stocks can be viewed by the A338 roadside. They were originally at the road junction, but are now opposite the Bat and Ball Hotel.

They were restored after being badly damaged by a lorry.

The stocks have a whipping post and horizontals with four leg holes. A modern roof has been erected over them.

== Breamore Mill ==
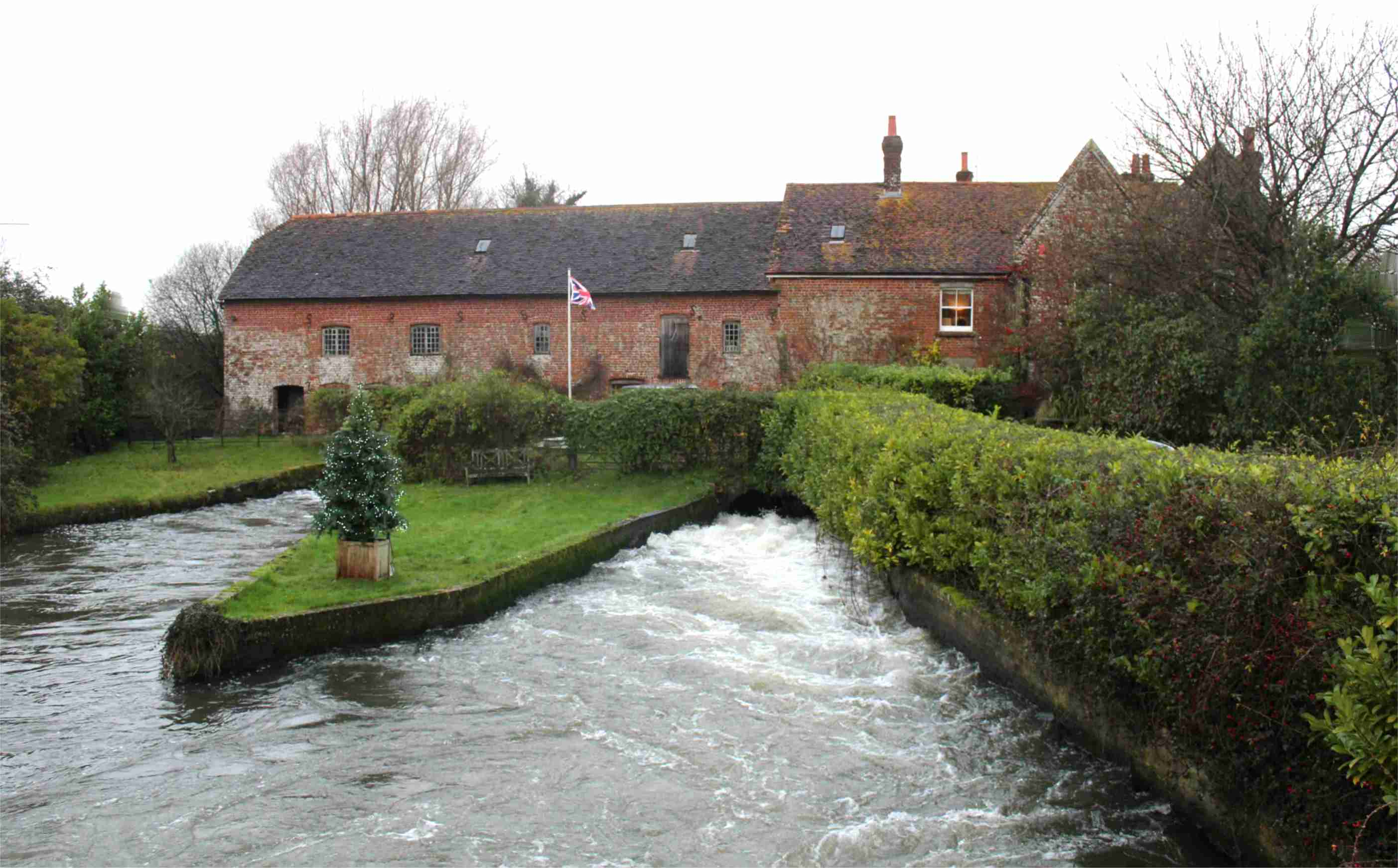
Breamore Mill from the road bridge

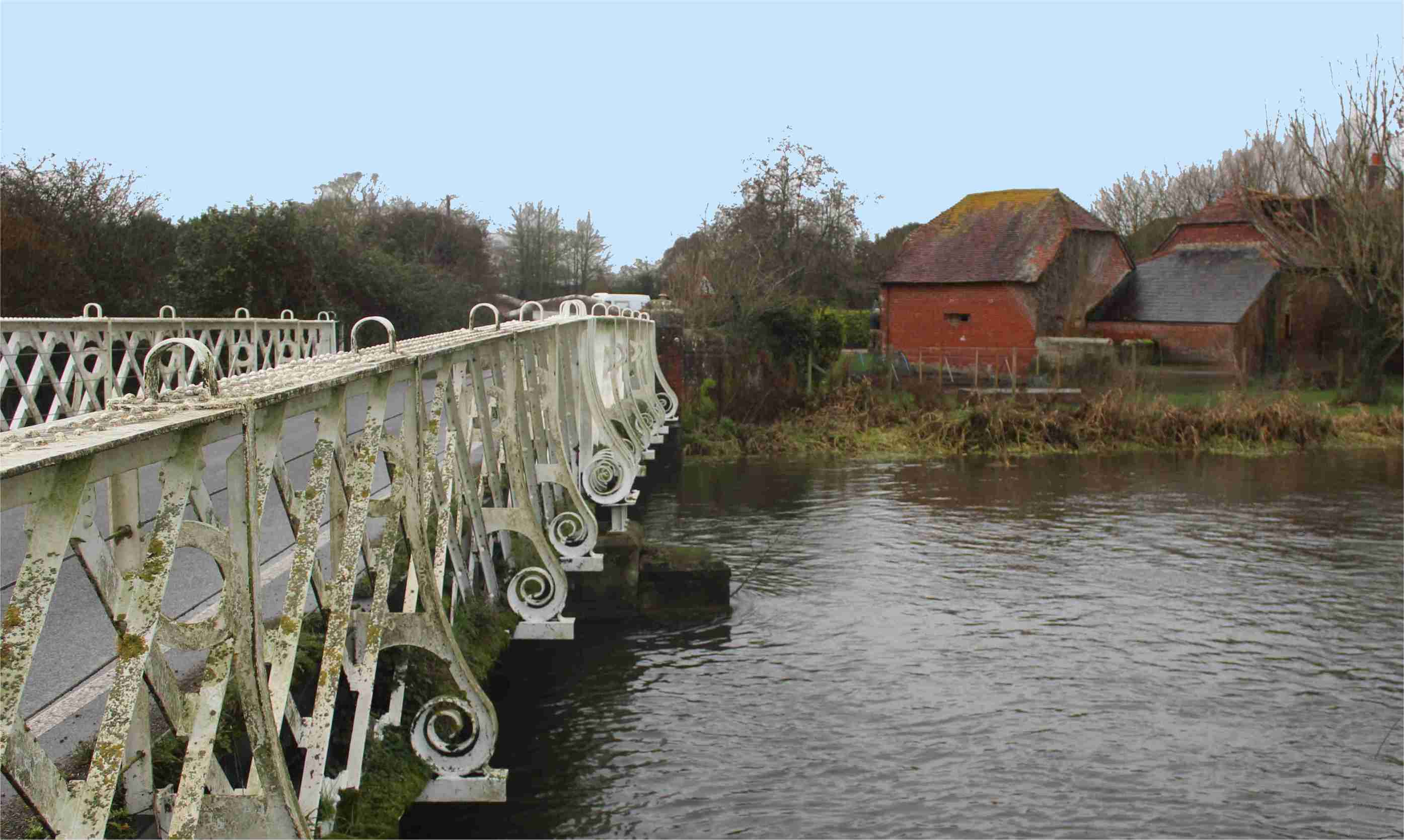
Victorian ironwork on Breamore bridge

Breamore Mill is on the river Avon on the east side of the village.

Near the mill on the road to Woodgreen village is a Victorian bridge with elaborate cast iron sides.
