= Triangular arch =

Architectural element

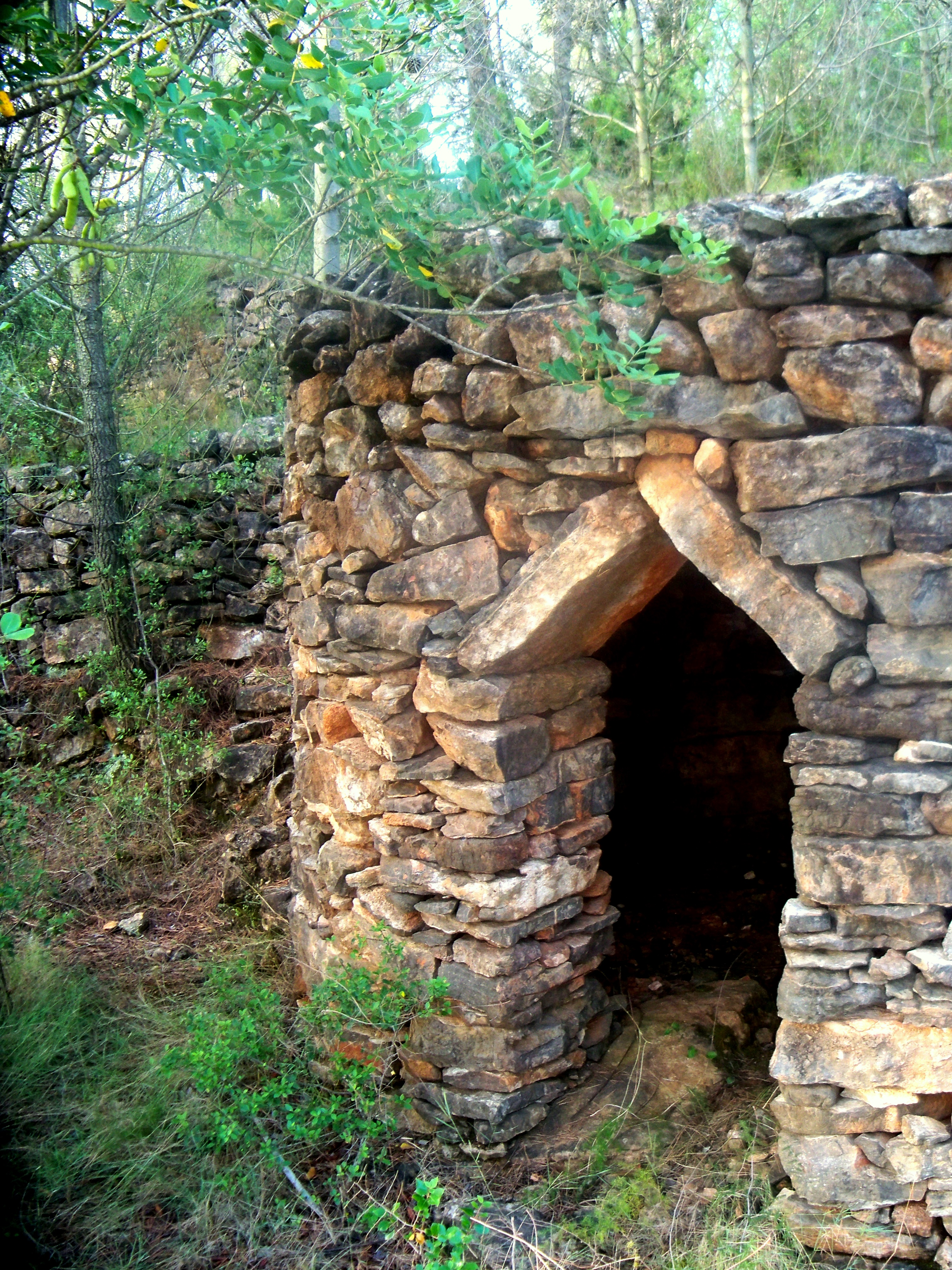
Triangular arch made of two stone slabs

In architecture, a triangular arch (sometimes angular arch) typically defines an arch where the intrados (inner surface of an arch) consists of two straight segments formed by two stone slabs leaning against each other. In this roof-like arrangement, mitre joint is usually used at the crown, thus the arch was in the past also called a mitre arch. Brick builders would call triangular any arch with straight inclined sides. Mayan corbel arches are also sometimes called triangular due to their shape.

Since the sides of a triangular arch are experiencing bending stress, it is a false arch in a structural sense (historically preceding the invention of true arches and going back to Neolithic times). The design was used in Anglo-Saxon England until the late 11th century (St Mary Coslany) over small openings.

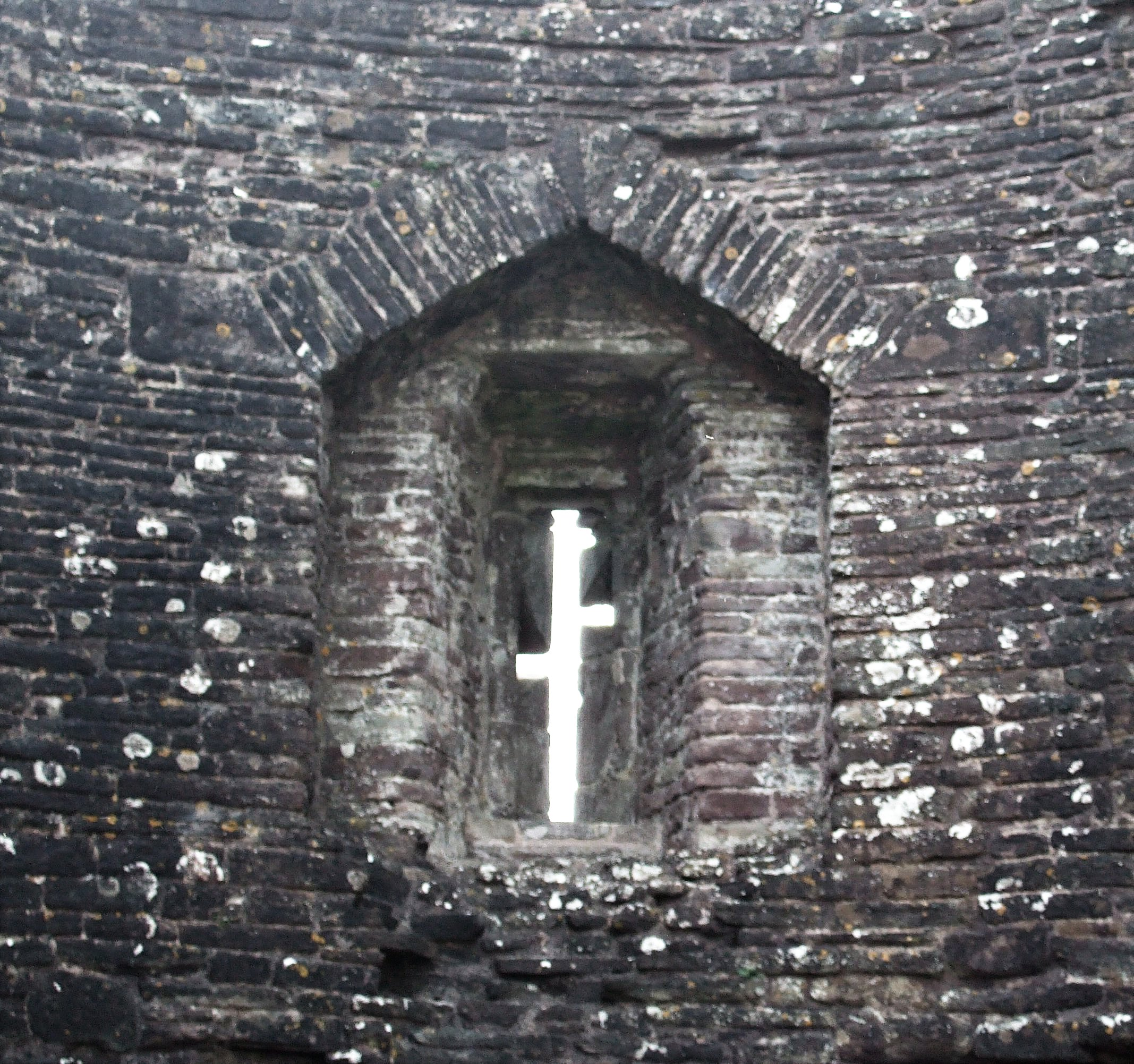
A triangular arch built using masonry (White Castle, Monmouthshire)

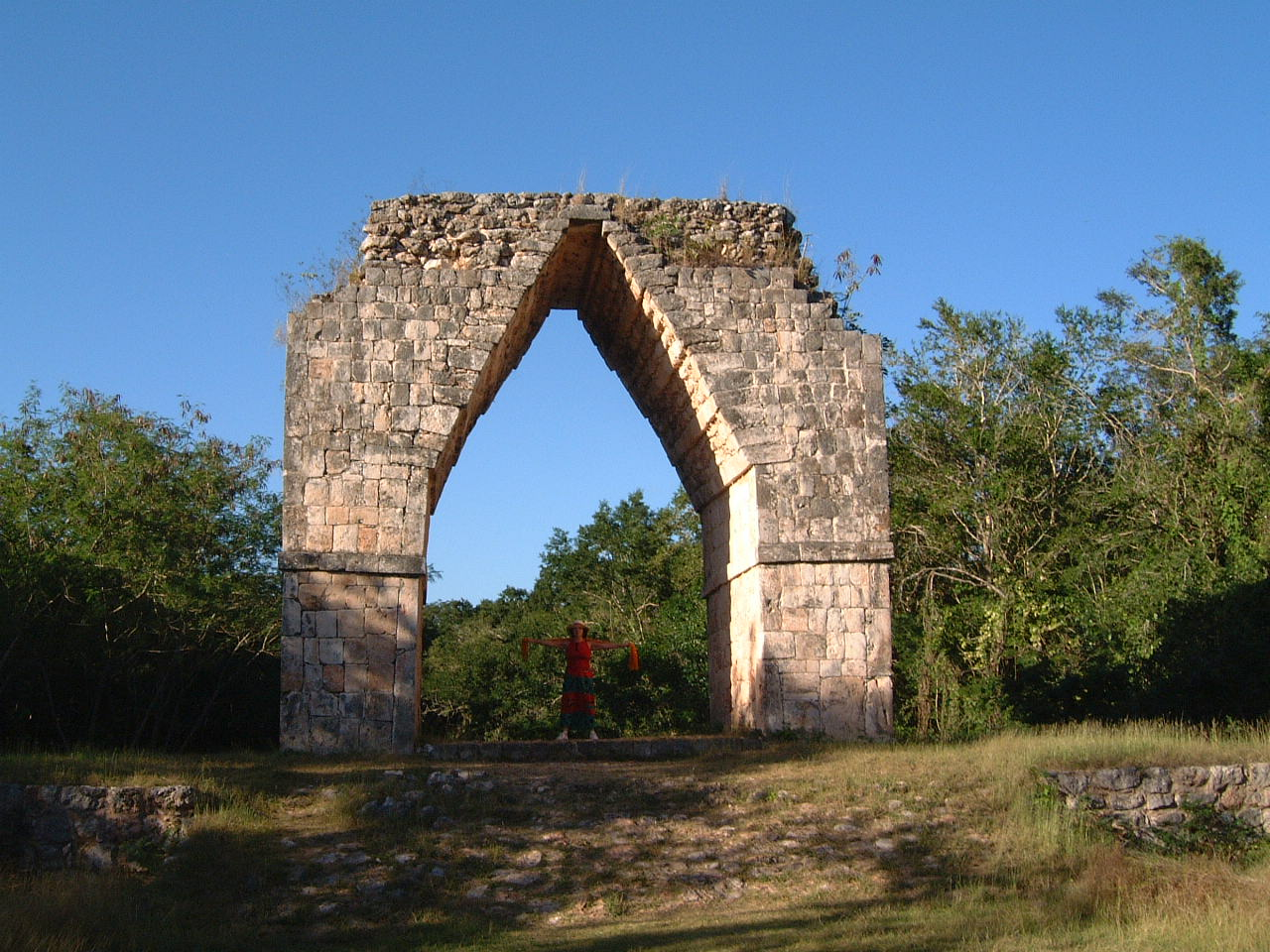
Mayan corbelled arch

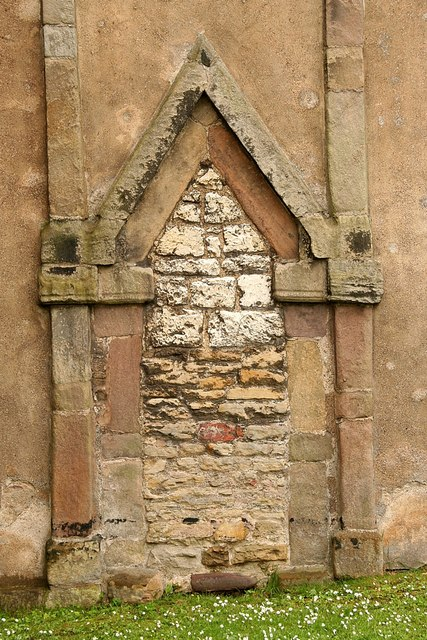
Doorway at St Peter's Church, Barton-upon-Humber (Anglo-Saxon architecture)

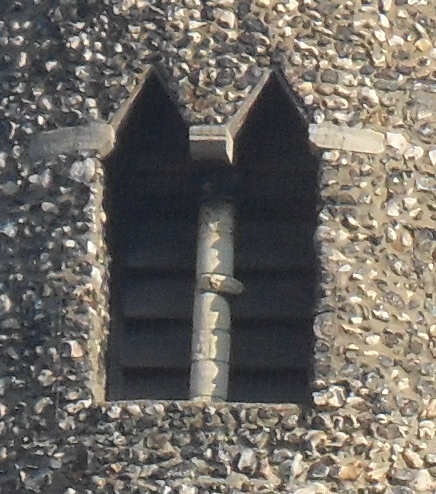
Arches at St Mary Coslany (Saxo-Norman architecture)

== See also ==
- Pediment, a triangular gable

== Sources ==
- Audsley, W.; Audsley, G.A. (1881). "Arch". Popular Dictionary of Architecture and the Allied Arts: A Work of Reference for the Architect, Builder, Sculptor, Decorative Artist, and General Student. With Numerous Illustrations from All Styles of Architecture, from the Egyptian to the Renaissance. Popular Dictionary of Architecture and the Allied Arts: A Work of Reference for the Architect, Builder, Sculptor, Decorative Artist, and General Student. G. P. Putnam's sons. pp. 24–39.
- Nikolich, Dimitriye (2020-05-08). "Thrust line analysis of triangular arches". Archive of Applied Mechanics. 90 (9). Springer Science and Business Media LLC: 1861–1874. doi:10.1007/s00419-020-01701-7. ISSN 0939-1533.
- Sturgis, Russell; Davis, Francis A. (2013). "Triangular Arch". Sturgis' Illustrated Dictionary of Architecture and Building: An Unabridged Reprint of the 1901-2 Edition. Dover Architecture. Dover Publications. ISBN 978-0-486-14840-3.
- Woodman, Francis; Bloom, Jonathan M. (2003). "Arch". Oxford Art Online. Oxford University Press. doi:10.1093/gao/9781884446054.article.t003657. ISBN 978-1-884446-05-4.
