= Anglo-Saxon architecture =

English architecture from the mid-5th century to 1066

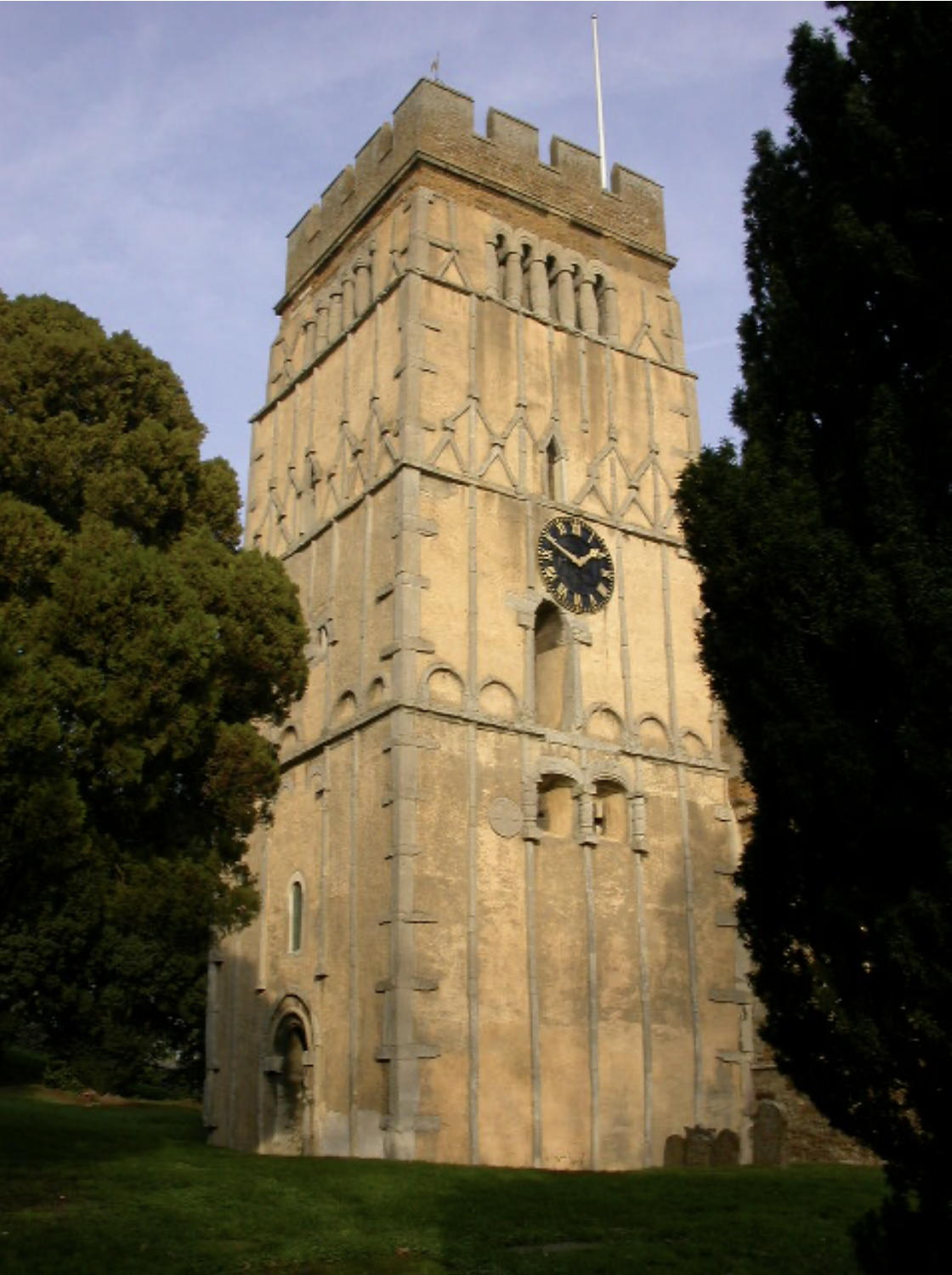
Distinctive Anglo-Saxon pilaster strips on the tower of All Saints' Church, Earls Barton in Northamptonshire

Anglo-Saxon architecture was a period in the history of architecture in England from the mid-5th century until the Norman Conquest of 1066. Anglo-Saxon secular buildings in Britain were generally simple, constructed mainly using timber with thatch for roofing. No universally accepted example survives above ground. Generally preferring not to settle within the old Roman cities, the Anglo-Saxons built small towns near their centres of agriculture, at fords in rivers or sited to serve as ports. In each town, a main hall was in the centre, provided with a central hearth.

There are many remains of Anglo-Saxon church architecture. At least fifty churches are of Anglo-Saxon origin with major Anglo-Saxon architectural features, with many more claiming to be, although in some cases the Anglo-Saxon part is small and much-altered. It is often impossible to reliably distinguish between pre- and post-Conquest 11th century work in buildings where most parts are later additions or alterations. The round-tower church and tower-nave church are distinctive Anglo-Saxon types. All surviving churches, except one timber church, are built of stone or brick, and in some cases show evidence of re-used Roman work.

The architectural character of Anglo-Saxon ecclesiastical buildings range from Celtic influenced architecture in the early period; Early Christian basilica-influenced architecture; and in the later Anglo-Saxon period, an architecture characterised by pilaster-strips, blank arcading, baluster shafts and triangular headed openings. In the last decades of the Anglo-Saxon kingdoms, a more general Romanesque style was introduced from the continent, as in the now built-over additions to Westminster Abbey made from 1050 onwards, already influenced by Norman style. In recent decades, architectural historians have become less confident that all undocumented minor "Romanesque" features post-date the Norman Conquest. Although once common, it has been incorrect for several decades to use the plain term "Saxon" for anything Anglo-Saxon that is later than the initial period of settlement in Britain.

== Houses and other secular buildings ==
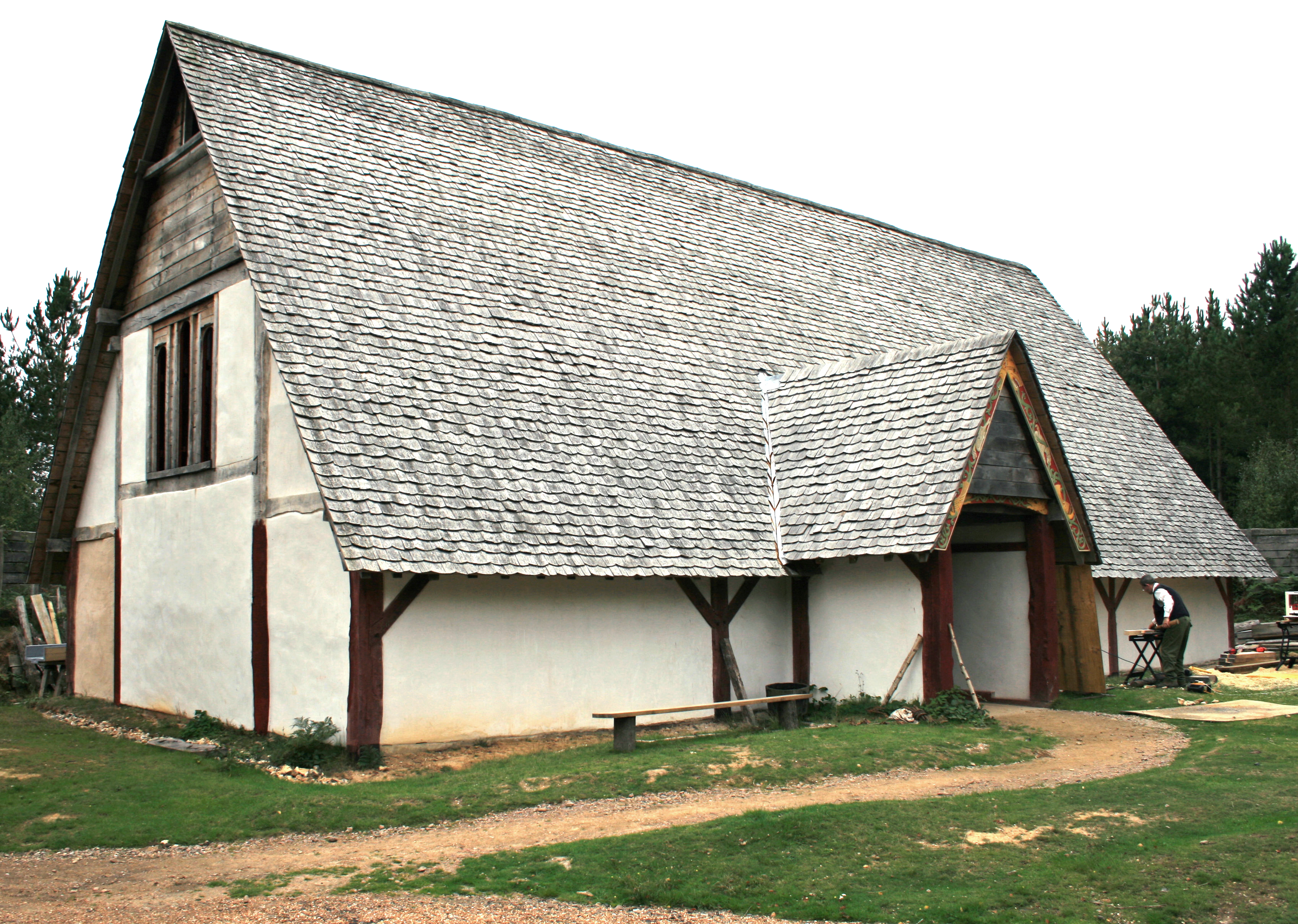
Reconstruction of an Anglo-Saxon hall from c. 1000 AD at Wychurst, Kent

Anglo-Saxon secular buildings were normally rectangular post-built structures, where timber posts were driven into the ground to form the framework of the walls upon which the thatched roofs were constructed. Of the hundreds of settlement sites excavated in England from this period, only 10 have revealed masonry used in domestic structures and confined to a few specific contexts. The usual explanation for the tendency of Anglo–Saxons to build in timber is one of technological inferiority or incompetence. However it is now accepted that technology and materials were part of conscious choices indivisible from their social meaning. Le Goff suggests that the Anglo-Saxon period was defined by its use of wood, providing evidence for the care and craftsmanship that the Anglo–Saxon invested into their wooden material culture, from cups to halls, and the concern for trees and timber in Anglo–Saxon place–names, literature and religion. Michael Shapland suggests:

The stone buildings imposed on England by the Romans would have been 'startling' and 'exceptional', and following the collapse of Roman society in the fifth century there was a widespread return to timber building, a 'cultural shift' that it is not possible to explain by recourse to technological determinism.

Anglo–Saxon building forms were very much part of this general building tradition. Timber was 'the natural building medium of the age': the very Anglo–Saxon word for 'building' is 'timbe'. Unlike in the Carolingian world, late Anglo–Saxon royal halls continued to be of timber in the manner of Yeavering centuries before, even though the king could clearly have mustered the resources to build in stone. Their preference must have been a conscious choice, perhaps an expression of 'deeply–embedded Germanic identity' on the part of the Anglo–Saxon royalty.

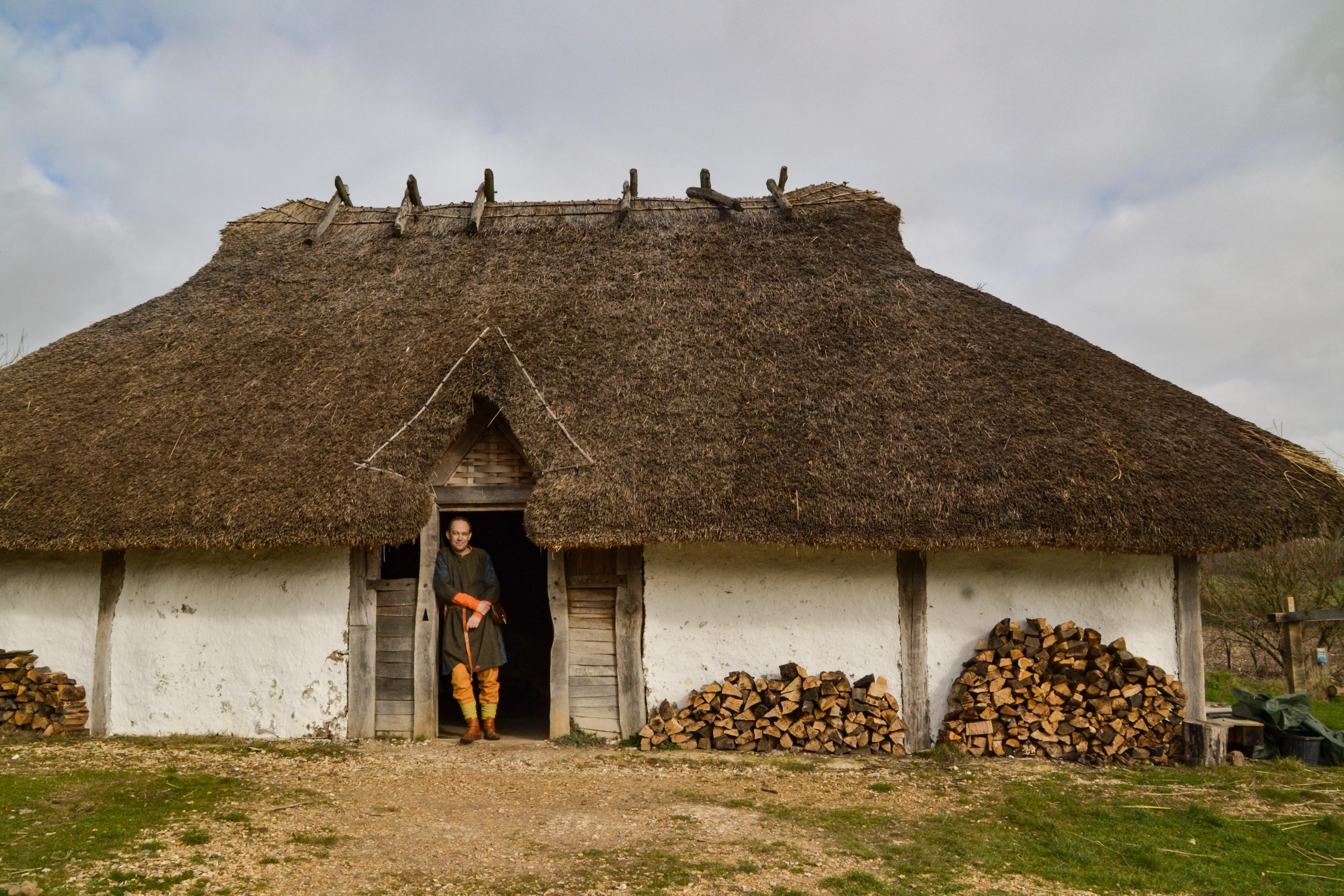
Anglo-Saxon house reconstruction at Butser Ancient Farm, Hampshire, 6th-8th century

Though very little contemporary evidence survives, methods of construction, including examples of later buildings, can be compared with methods on the continent. The major rural buildings were sunken-floor (Grubenhäuser) or post-hole buildings, although Helena Hamerow suggest this distinction is less clear. An excavated example is at Mucking in Essex. In addition to the sunken huts, vernacular buildings from the migration period found at Mucking included more substantial halls up to 50 feet (15 m) long and 25 feet (7.6 m) wide with entrances in the middle of both longer sides.

Even the elite had simple buildings, with a central fire and a hole in the roof to let the smoke escape and the largest of which rarely had more than one floor, and one room. Buildings vary widely in size, most were square or rectangular, though some round houses have been found. Frequently these buildings have sunken floors; a shallow pit over which a plank floor was suspended. The pit may have been used for storage, but more likely was filled with straw for winter insulation. A variation on the sunken floor design is found in towns, where the "basement" may be as deep as nine feet, suggesting a storage or work area below a suspended floor. Another common design was simple post framing, with heavy posts set directly into the ground, supporting the roof. The space between the posts was filled in with wattle and daub, or occasionally, planks. The floors were generally packed earth, though planks were sometimes used. Roofing materials varied, with thatch being the most common, though turf and even wooden shingles were also used.

The most archaeologically striking example of a royal palace is found at Yeavering (Northumbria). Excavated by Hope-Taylor, the 1977 site report illustrates a complex set of wooden halls, axially aligned. However, John Blair has argued that, from c. 600 to c. 900, elite settlements are archaeologically invisible. From the mid-10th century onwards, a unique architectural form emerges at high-status thegnly sites – the Long Range. Comprising a combined hall and chambers, these are understood to represent a deliberate set of performative symbols of power and status put in play by the newly powerful thegnly class.

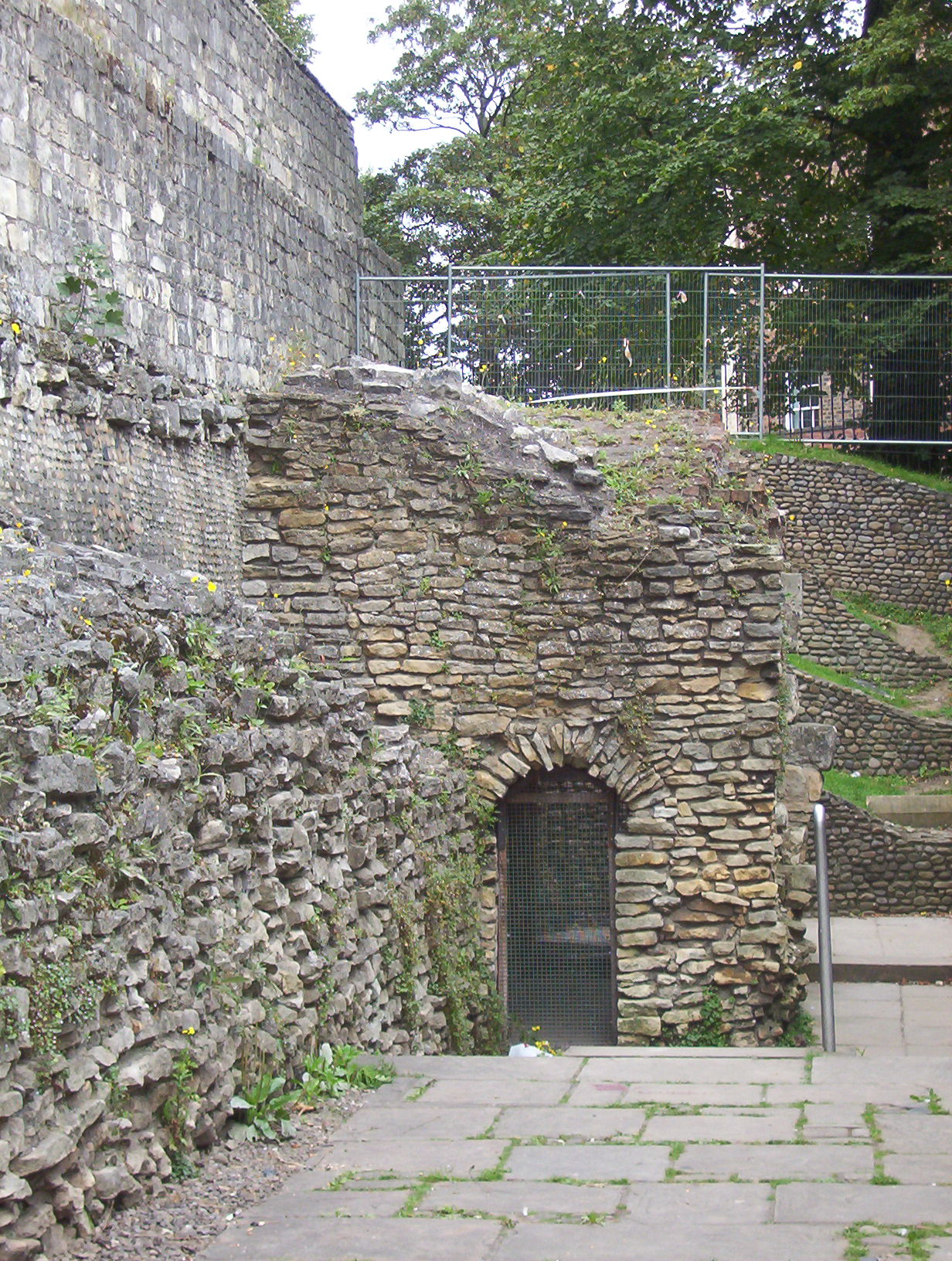
The remains of the Anglian Tower, York

During the 9th and 10th centuries, fortifications (burhs) were constructed around towns to defend against Viking attacks. Almost no secular work remains above ground, although the Anglian Tower in York has been controversially dated to the 7th century. Recent evidence suggests that St George's Tower, Oxford, may be a surviving part of the defences surrounding the Anglo-Saxon burh of Oxford. The Sea Gate in the Roman fort of Portchester Castle has been dated to the mid-11th century, and was associated with a thegnly house with a tower.

There is a reconstruction of an Anglo-Saxon settlement at West Stow in Suffolk, and contemporary illustrations of both secular and religious buildings are sometimes found in illuminated manuscripts.

== Church architecture: historical context ==
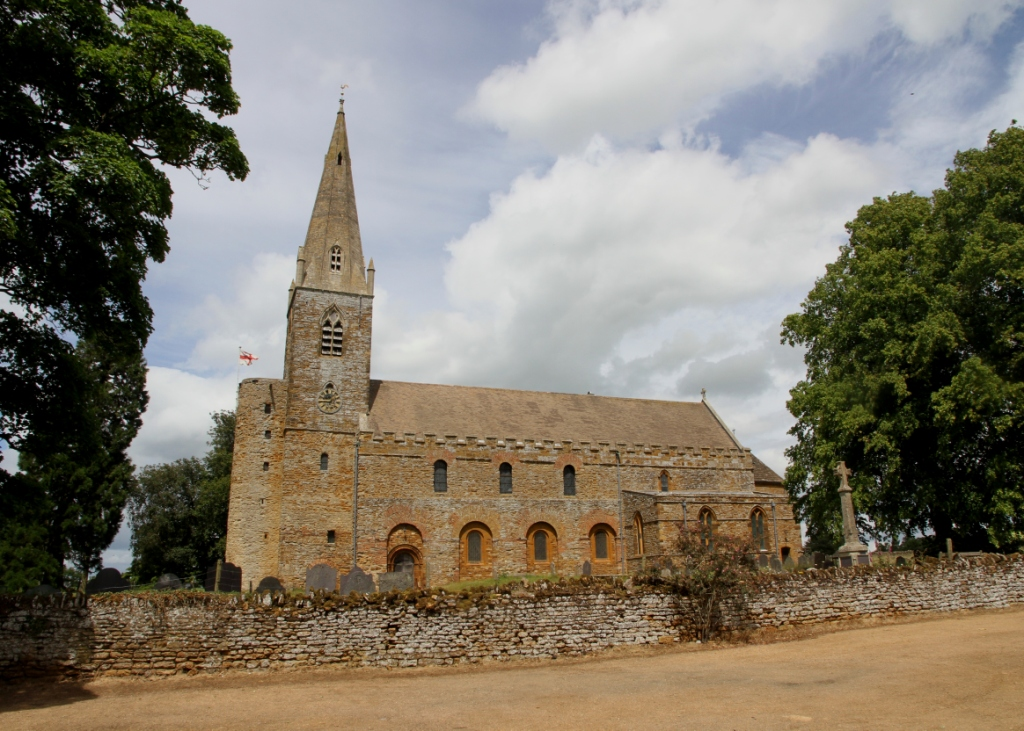
All Saints' Church, Brixworth, Northamptonshire

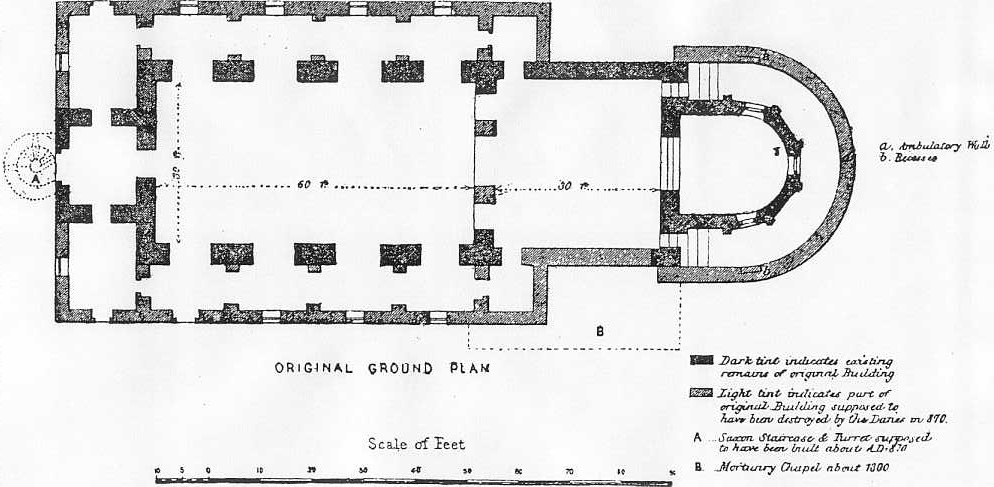
Reconstructed basilican plan of All Saints' Church, Brixworth in Northamptonshire

The fall of Roman Britain at the beginning of the fifth century, according to Bede, allowed an influx of invaders from northern Germany including the Angles and Saxons, who followed a form of paganism.

St Patrick, a Romano-British man, converted Ireland to Christianity, from where much of Western Scotland was converted and much of Northumbria was reconverted. Links were also established between the Christian communities in Ireland and those in Wales and the West country at sites such as St Piran's Oratory which represents some of the earliest Christian architecture extant on the British mainland. The architecture was initially influenced by Coptic monasticism. Examples of this can be seen today in the form of rectangular dry-stone corbelled structures such as at Gallarus Oratory, Dingle and Illauntannig, Ireland. Christianity and Irish influence came to England through missionaries. In 635, a centre of Celtic Christianity was established at Lindisfarne, Northumbria, where St Aidan founded a monastery.

In 597, the mission of Augustine from Rome came to England to convert the southern Anglo-Saxons, and founded the first cathedral and a Benedictine monastery at Canterbury. These churches consisted of a nave with side chambers, following Roman precedents.

In 664 a synod was held at Whitby, Yorkshire, and differences between the Celtic and Roman practices throughout England were reconciled, mostly in favour of Rome. Larger churches developed in the form of basilicas, for example at All Saints' Church, Brixworth.

The Romano-British populations of Wales, the West Country, and Cumbria experienced a degree of autonomy from Anglo-Saxon influence, represented by distinct linguistic, liturgical and architectural traditions, having much in common with the Irish and Breton cultures across the Celtic Sea, and allying themselves with the Viking invaders. This was however, gradually elided by centuries of English dominance. Characteristically circular buildings as opposed to rectangular, often in stone as well as timber, along with sculptured Celtic crosses, holy wells and the reoccupation of Iron Age and Roman sites from hillforts such as Cadbury Castle, promontory hillforts such as Tintagel, and enclosed settlements called Rounds characterise the western Sub-Roman Period up to the 8th century in southwest England and continue much later in independent Wales at post-Roman cities such as Caerleon and Carmarthen.

Subsequent Danish (Viking) invasion marked a period of destruction of many buildings in England, including in 793 the raid on Lindisfarne. Buildings including cathedrals were rebuilt, and the threat of conflict had an inevitable influence on the architecture of the time. During and after the reign of Alfred the Great (871–899), towns (burhs) were fortified. Contemporary defensive banks and ditches can still be seen today as a result of this. Oxford is an example of one of these fortified towns, where the eleventh-century stone tower of St Michael's Church has prominent position beside the former site of the North gate. The building of church towers, replacing the basilican narthex or west porch, can be attributed to this late period of Anglo-Saxon architecture.

== 7th century ==
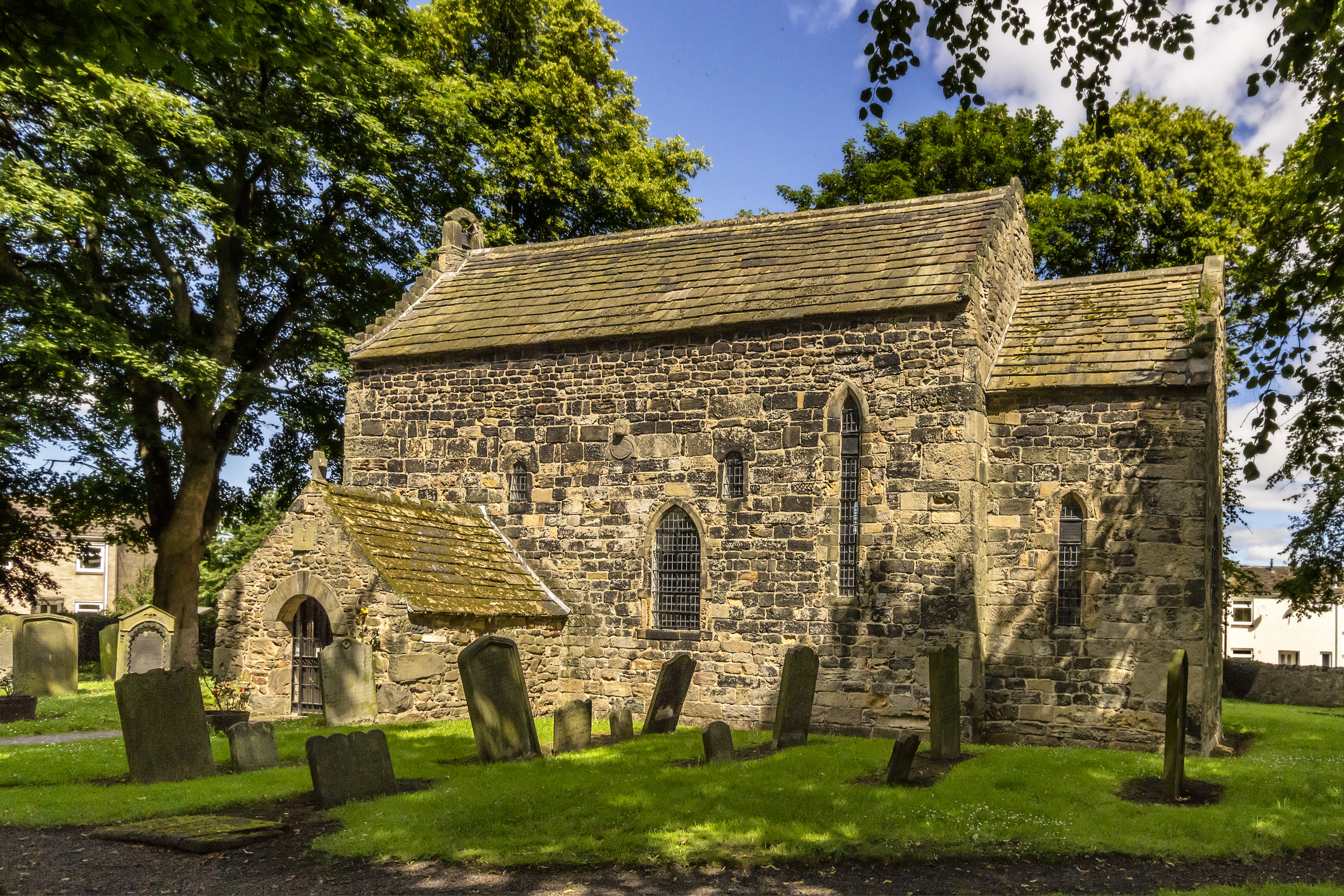
Escomb Church, County Durham, c. 680

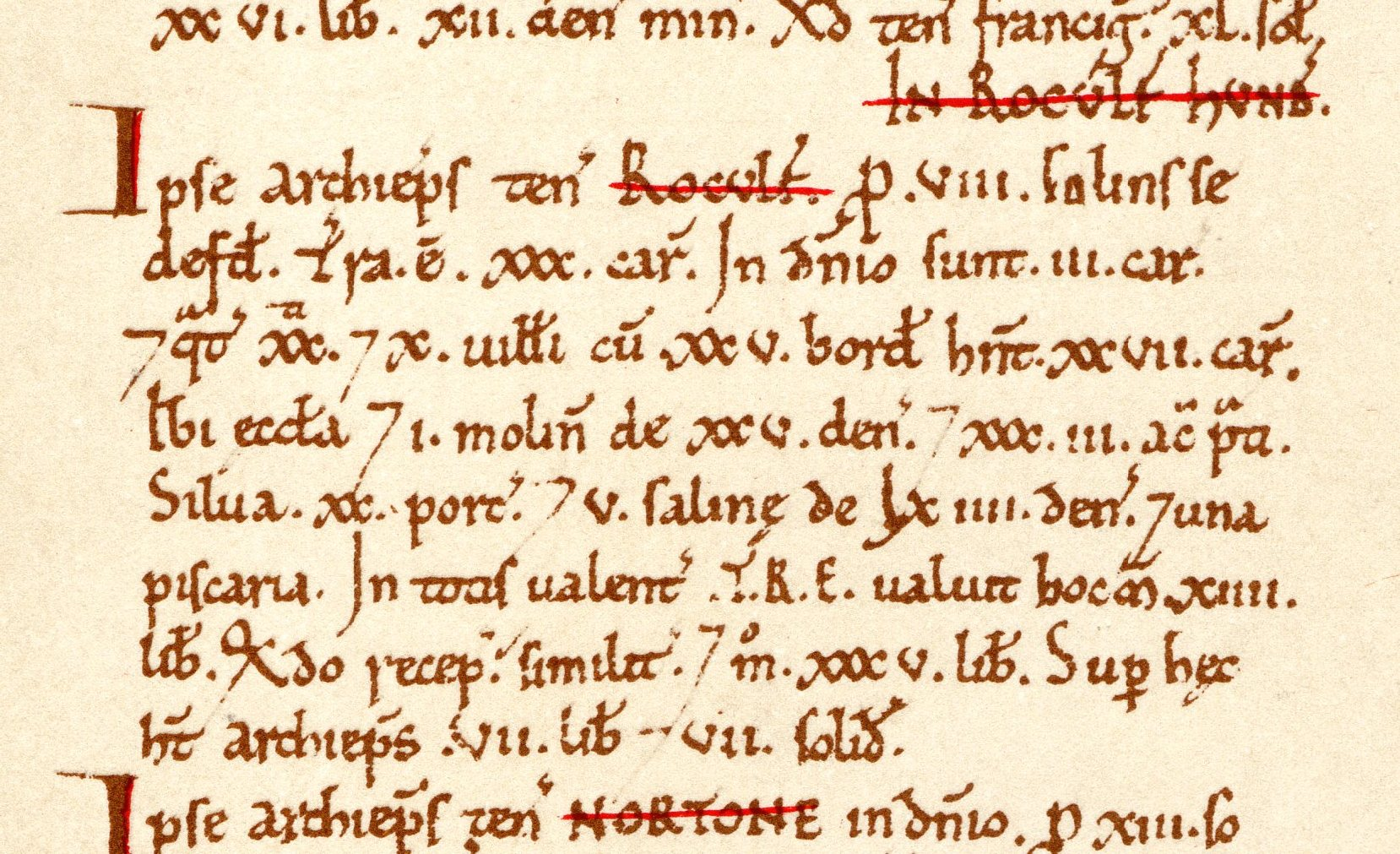
Triple arch opening separating the nave and apse in the 7th-century St Mary's Church, Reculver, Kent (now largely destroyed)

In contrast to secular buildings, stone was used from very early on to build churches, although a single wooden example has survived at Greensted Church, which is now thought to be from the end of the period. Bede makes it clear in both his Ecclesiastical History and his Historiam Abbatum that the masonry construction of churches, including his own at Jarrow, was undertaken morem Romanorum, "in the manner of the Romans", in explicit contrast to existing traditions of timber construction. Even at Canterbury, Bede believed that St Augustine's first cathedral had been 'repaired' or 'recovered' (recuperavit) from an existing Roman church, when in fact it had been newly constructed from Roman materials. The belief was "the Christian Church was Roman therefore a masonry church was a Roman building".

The earliest surviving Anglo-Saxon architecture dates from the 7th century, essentially beginning with Augustine of Canterbury in Kent from 597; for this he probably imported workmen from Frankish Gaul. The cathedral and abbey in Canterbury, together with churches in Kent at Minster in Sheppey (c.664) and Reculver (669), and in Essex at the Chapel of St Peter-on-the-Wall at Bradwell-on-Sea (where only the nave survives), define the earliest type in southeast England. A simple nave without aisles provided the setting for the main altar; east of this a chancel arch, perhaps a triple arch opening as at Reculver, separated off the apse for use by the clergy. However, there is no surviving complete 7th-century church with an apse. Flanking the apse and east end of the nave were side chambers serving as sacristies; further porticus might continue along the nave to provide for burials and other purposes. Exceptions to this include the Old Minster, Winchester.

Church designs at the time differed between the North of England, which are narrow with square ended chancels, rather than the apses of the south. In Northumbria the early development of Christianity was influenced by the Irish mission, important churches being built in timber. Masonry churches became prominent from the late 7th century with the foundations of Wilfrid at Ripon and Hexham, and of Benedict Biscop at Monkwearmouth-Jarrow. These buildings had long naves and small rectangular chancels; porticus sometimes surrounded the naves. Elaborate crypts are a feature of Wilfrid's buildings. The best preserved early Northumbrian church is Escomb Church.

- St Martin's Church, Canterbury (7th century nave with parts of possible earlier origin)
- Old Minster, Winchester (648) (only foundations remain, but are marked out)
- St Peter-on-the-Wall, Bradwell-on-Sea, Essex (c. 654, on the site of a Roman fort, with reused materials)
- St Mary's Church, Reculver (c. 669, largely demolished 1809)
- Ripon Cathedral crypt (c. 670)
- Hexham Abbey crypt (674)
- Monkwearmouth-Jarrow Abbey, Northumberland (c. 675-685; the tower at Monkwearmouth is a later Saxon addition)
- Escomb Church, County Durham (c. 680)
- St Peter's Church, Titchfield (c. 680
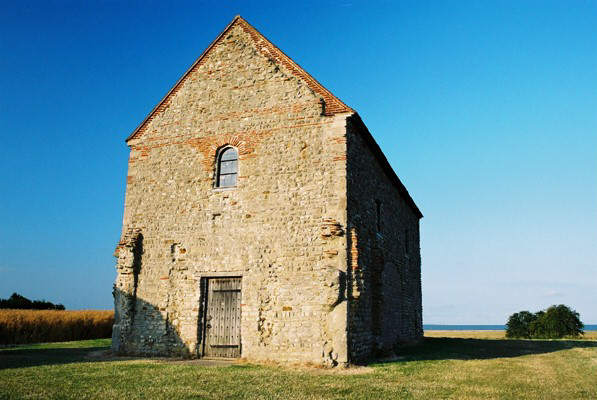
St Peter's on the Wall, Bradwell-on-Sea, Essex.

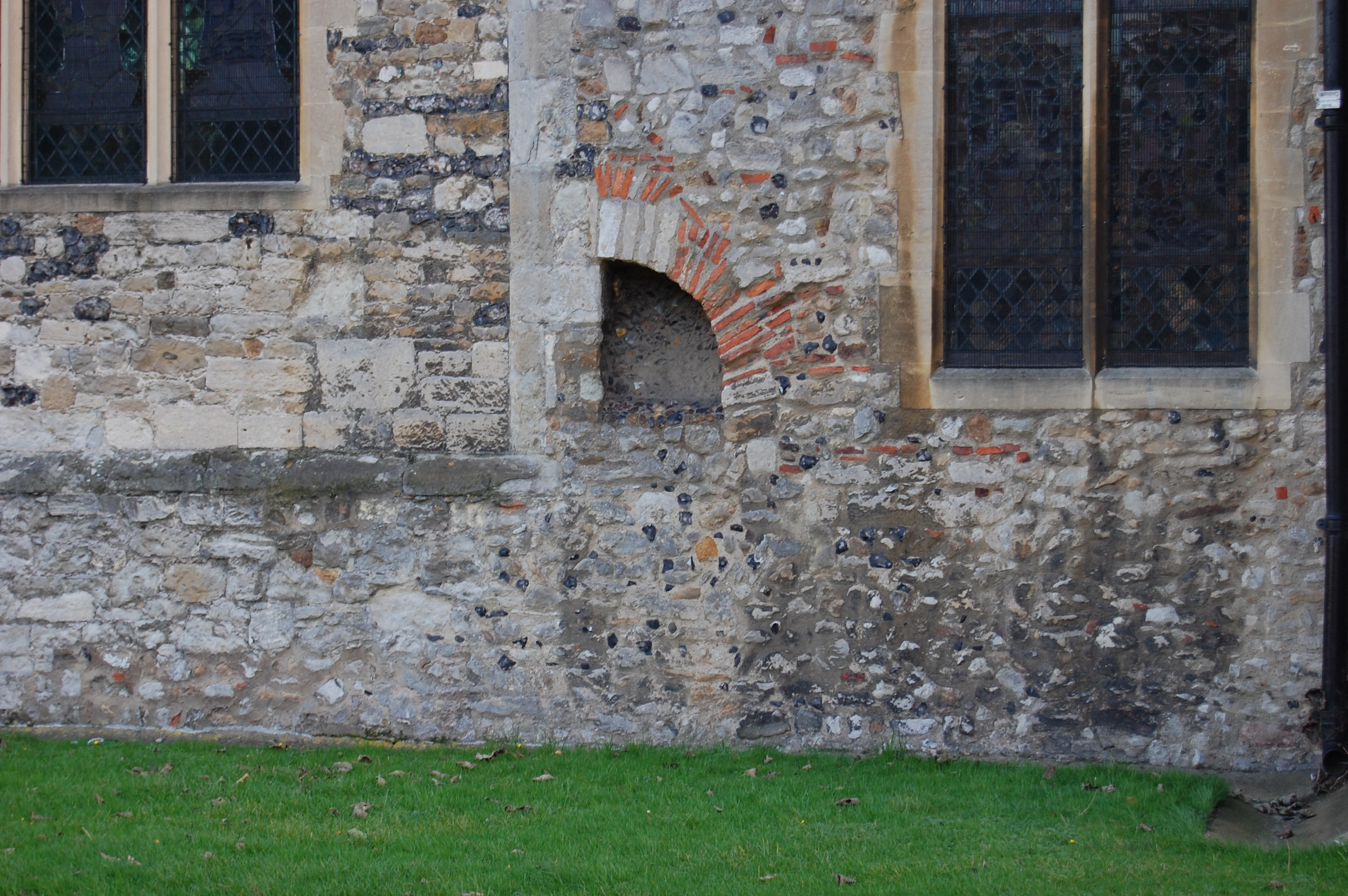
7th-century archway at Prittlewell parish church in Southend-on-Sea, Essex.

St Paul's Church, Jarrow

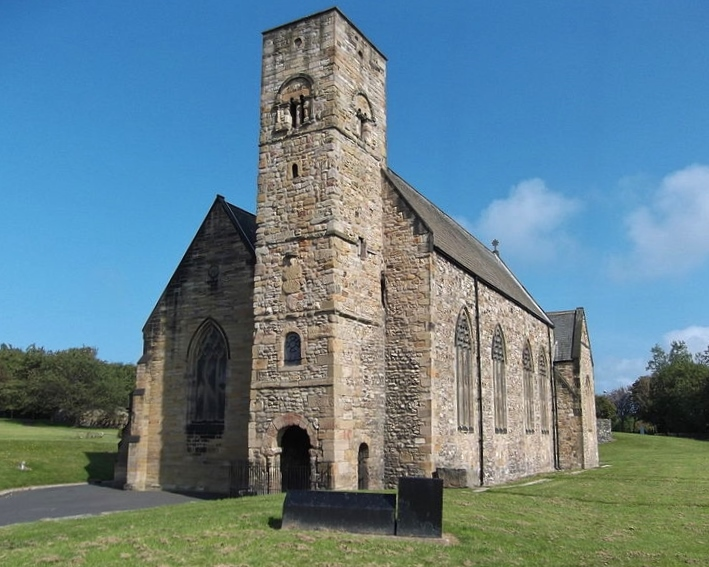
St Peter's Church, Monkwearmouth

== 8th to 10th centuries ==
Little is attributable to the 8th and 9th centuries, due to the regular Viking raids. Developments in design and decoration may have been influenced by the Carolingian Renaissance on the continent, where there was a conscious attempt to create a Roman revival in architecture.

- St Wystan's Church, Repton, Derbyshire (crypt c. 750, chancel walls ninth century)
- St Mary's Priory Church, Deerhurst, Gloucestershire (c. 930)
- All Saints' Church, Earls Barton, Northamptonshire
- All Saints' Church, Brixworth, Northamptonshire (previously dated to 675, but now regarded as later)
- St Helen's Church, Skipwith, North Yorkshire (tower c. 960)
- St Peter's Church, Barton-upon-Humber, North Lincolnshire (tower c. 970, baptistery possibly ninth century)
- St Laurence's Church, Bradford-on-Avon, Wiltshire
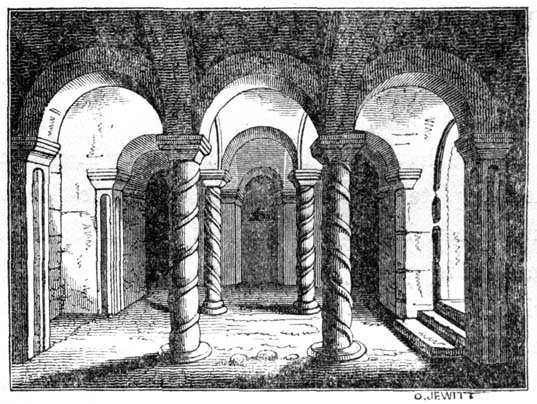
A 19th-century engraving of the crypt at Repton where Æthelbald was interred.

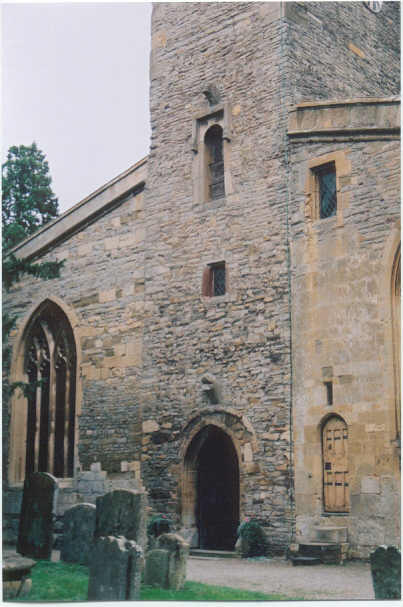
Detail of tower at St Mary's, Deerhurst.

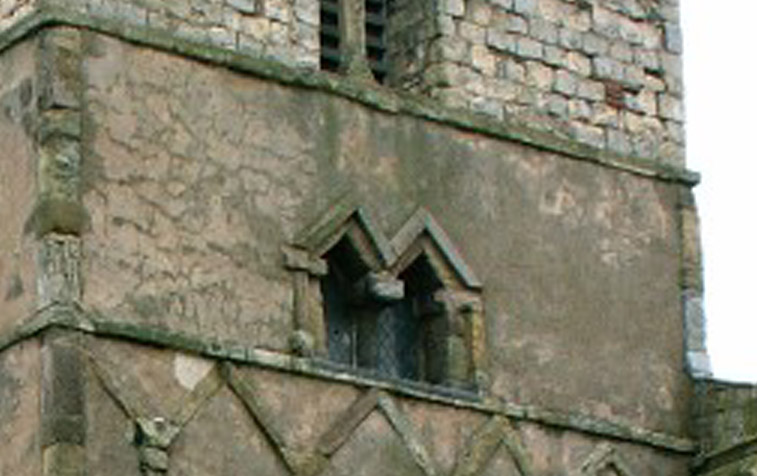
Double triangular arch windows in the tower of St Peter's Church, Barton-upon-Humber.

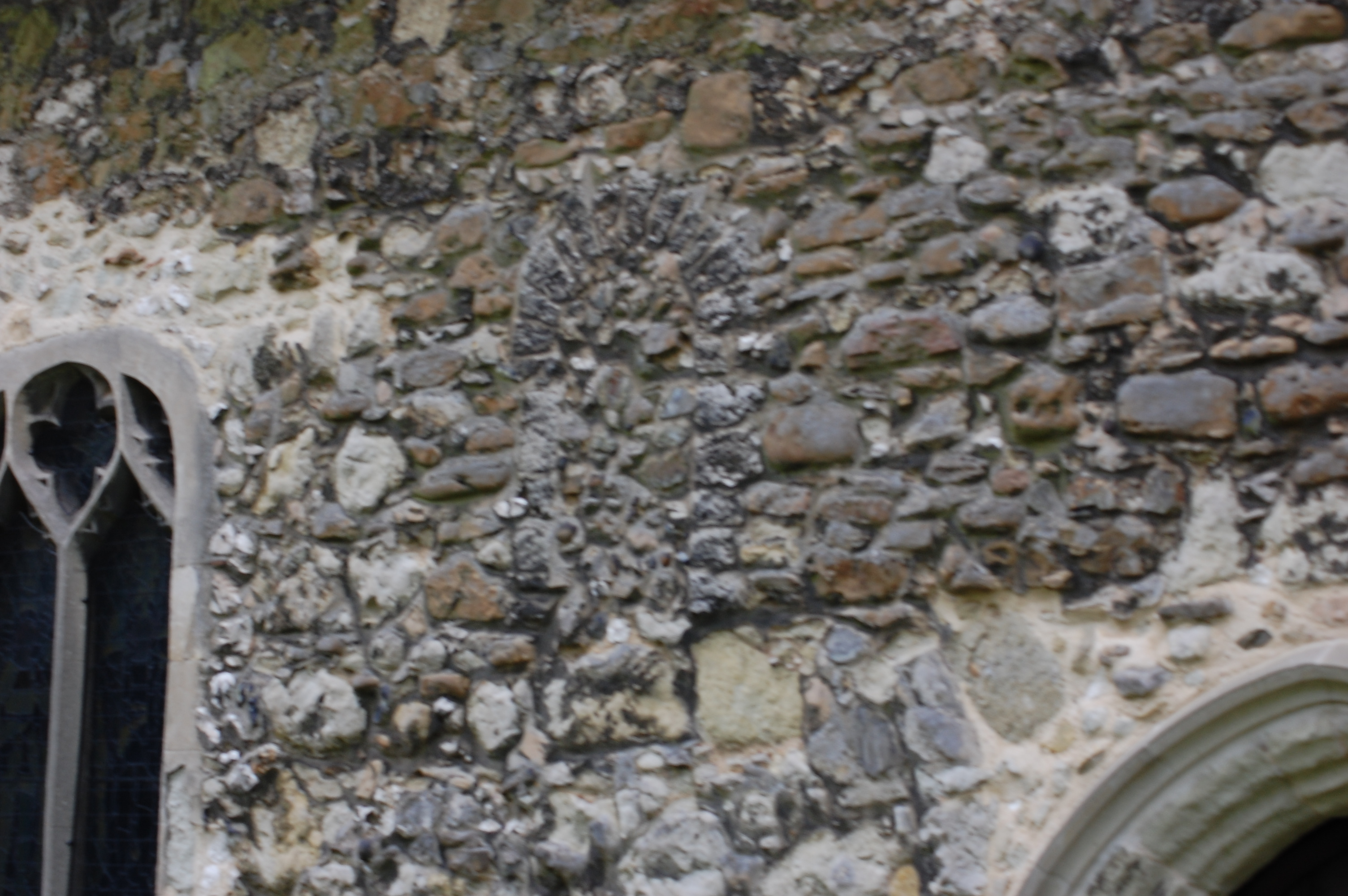
Blocked Anglo-Saxon round-arched window at St Michael's Church in Fobbing, Essex

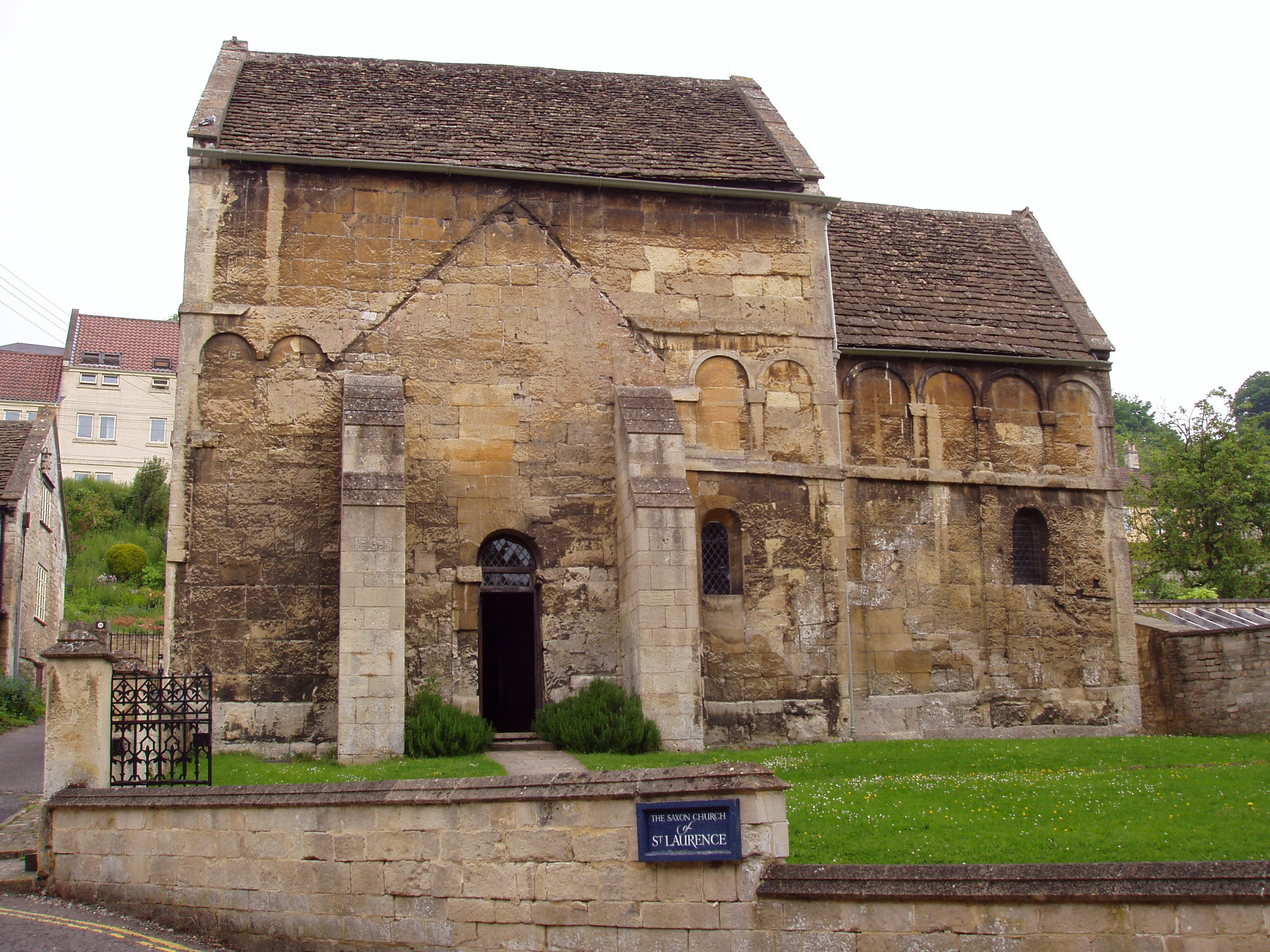
St Laurence's Church, Bradford on Avon, seen from the south

== 11th century ==
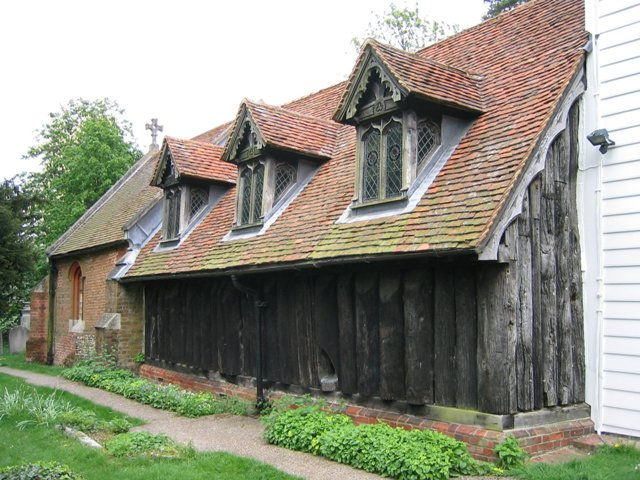
Greensted Church, Essex, with Anglo-Saxon oak wall

The 11th century saw the first appearance of the High Romanesque style in Britain. The decades before the Conquest were prosperous for the elite, and there was great patronage of church building by figures such as Lady Godiva. Many cathedrals were constructed, including Westminster Abbey, although all these were subsequently rebuilt after 1066. Norman workers may have been imported for Westminster Abbey through the Norman Archbishop of Canterbury, Robert of Jumièges. Major work was also done at St Augustine's Abbey, Canterbury, where two of the earlier churches were connected with a large rotunda.

Recent arguments and recent archaeological discoveries have raised the possibility that the 11th-century St George's Tower, Oxford, predates both the foundation of Oxford Castle and the Norman Conquest, and functioned as a gate tower commanding the western entrance into the pre-Conquest burh. If so, the tower was then incorporated into the Norman castle built on the site in the 1070s, instead of being constructed along with it as architectural historians have long assumed. It would thus be almost without parallel in England as a purely secular and defensive Anglo-Saxon structure (see above, Secular architecture).

The gatehouse of Exeter Castle, with triangular-headed windows

Saxon architecture continued to be used for lesser churches after the Norman conquest of 1066, as there was an extended period of Saxo-Norman overlap that lasted for much of the later 11th century. Many undocumented late-Saxon buildings, such as the round-towered churches of Norfolk, may in fact post-date the Conquest. William the Conqueror's castle gatehouse at Exeter (c. 1067) features Saxon-looking triangular-headed windows, suggesting either the use of local masons or deliberate adoption of Saxon formas. Saxon spolia was used at St Albans Abbey (now a cathedral), where stone baluster shafts were repurposed in the triforium of the Norman abbey church.

- Greensted Church, Essex (1013 with oak palisade walls)
- Stow Minster, Lincolnshire (c. 1040 with a small part surviving from 975)
- St Bene't's Church, Cambridge (c. 1040)
- St Michael at the Northgate, Oxford (c. 1040)
- St Mary's Church, Breamore, Hampshire
- Holy Trinity Church, Bosham, Sussex
- Holy Trinity Church, Great Paxton, Cambridgeshire (possibly post-conquest)
- St Nicholas' Church, Worth, West Sussex (c. 950 – 1050)
- Church of St Mary the Blessed Virgin, Sompting, West Sussex (c. 1050)
- Odda's Chapel, Deerhurst, Gloucestershire (1056)
- St Matthew's Church, Langford, Oxfordshire (formerly Berkshire) (after 1050)
- The tower of Holy Trinity Church in Colchester, Essex has a pre-Conquest 11th-century tower built out of Roman rubble
- St George's Tower, Oxford, Oxfordshire (now a part of Oxford Castle but possibly of pre-Conquest construction date)
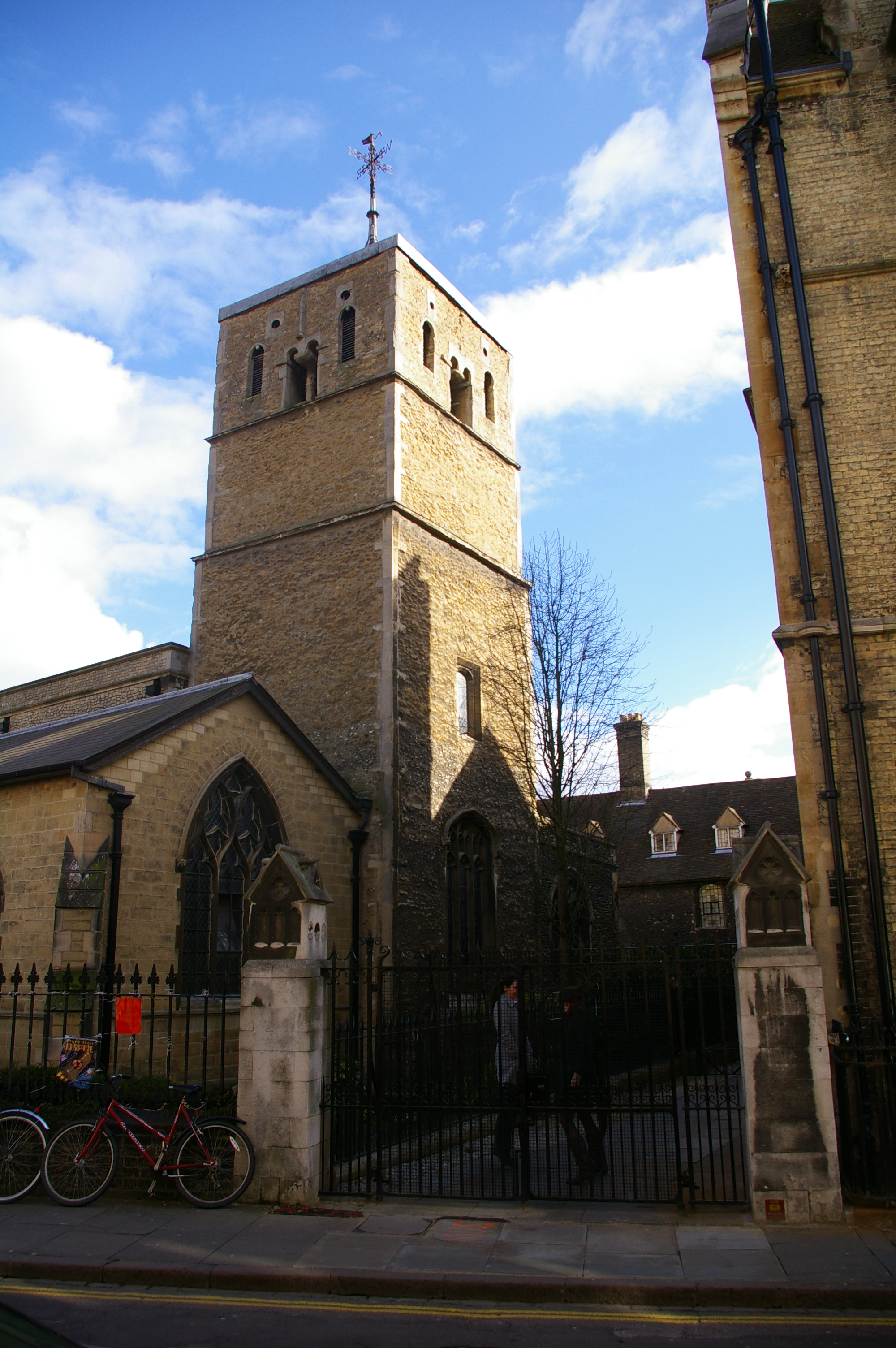
St Bene't's Church, Cambridge.

Rhenish helm roof at Sompting

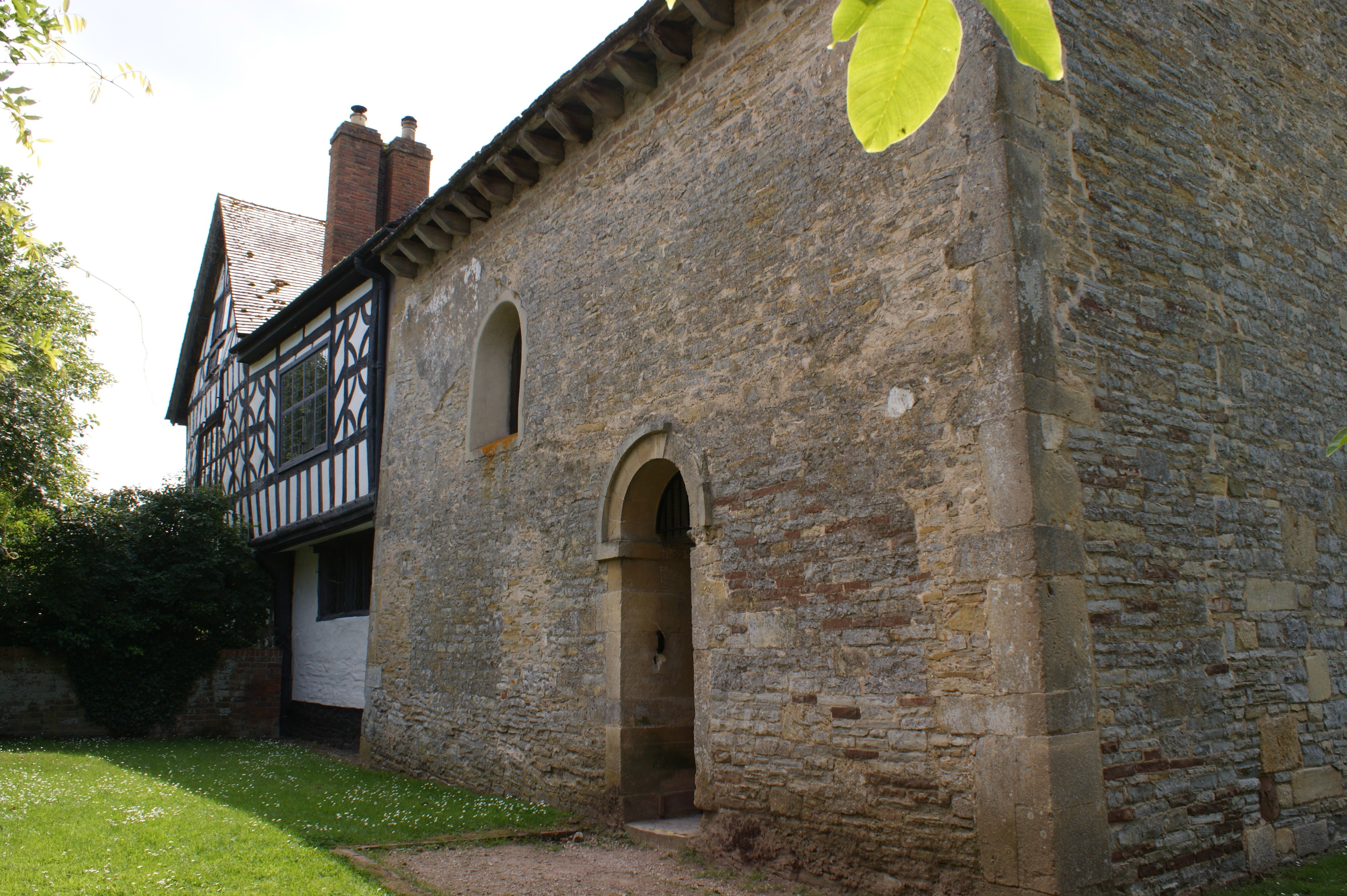
Odda's Chapel, Deerhurst, attached to later house.

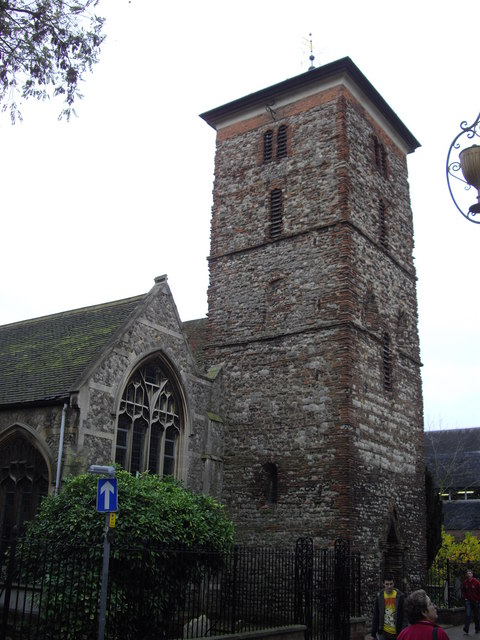
Holy Trinity Church, Colchester, the tower and west doorway of which are Anglo-Saxon

Crossing arches of Stow Minster (the pointed arches are a later insertion).

St Mary's Church, Breamore

Apse of St Nicholas' Church, Worth

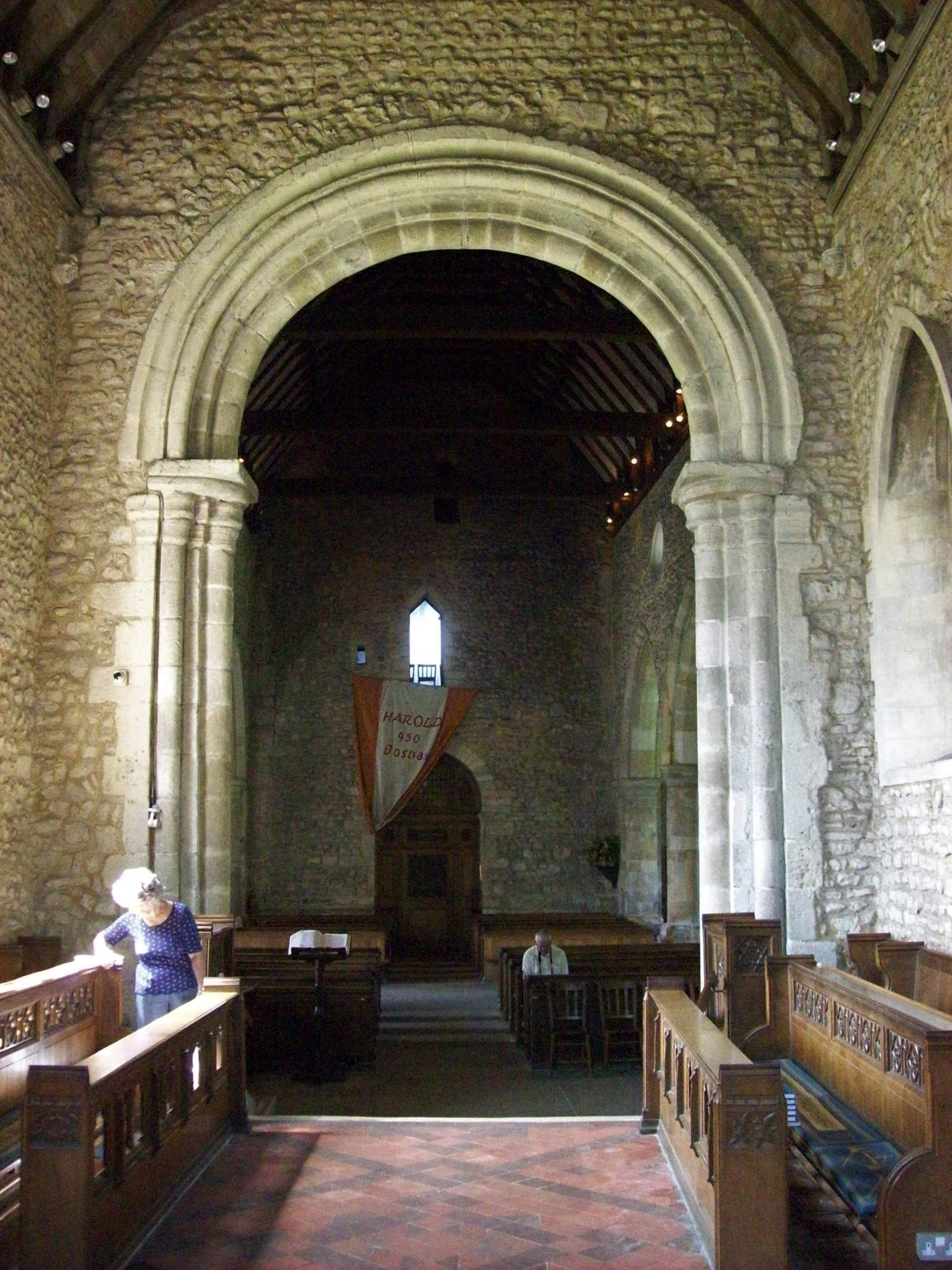
Chancel arch of Holy Trinity, Bosham

Arcade capitals in Holy Trinity Church, Great Paxton

== Diagnostic features ==
There are many churches that contain Anglo-Saxon features, although some of these features were also used in the early Norman period. H.M. Taylor surveyed 267 churches with Anglo-Saxon architectural features and ornaments. Typical Anglo-Saxon features include:

- long-and-short or megalithic quoins
- lesenes or pilaster-strips applied over a wall
- triangular-headed openings, sometimes paired
- double-splayed windows (i.e. splayed inside and outside)
- turned stone baluster shafts separating windows
- reuse of Roman materials, especially thin bricks
- herringbone stone work
- porticus chambers instead of fully-fledged transepts or aisles

A number of early Anglo-Saxon churches are based on a basilica with north and south porticus (projecting chambers) to give a cruciform plan. However cruciform plans for churches were used in other periods. Similarly, a chancel in the form of a rounded apse is often found in early Anglo-Saxon churches, but can be found in other periods as well.

Long-and-short quoins in Odda's Chapel, Deerhurst

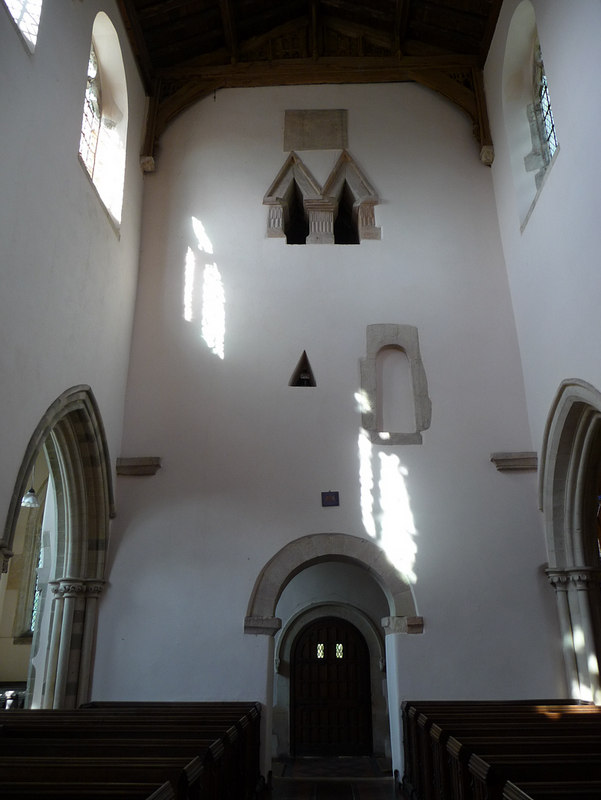
Double triangular windows at St Mary's, Deerhurst

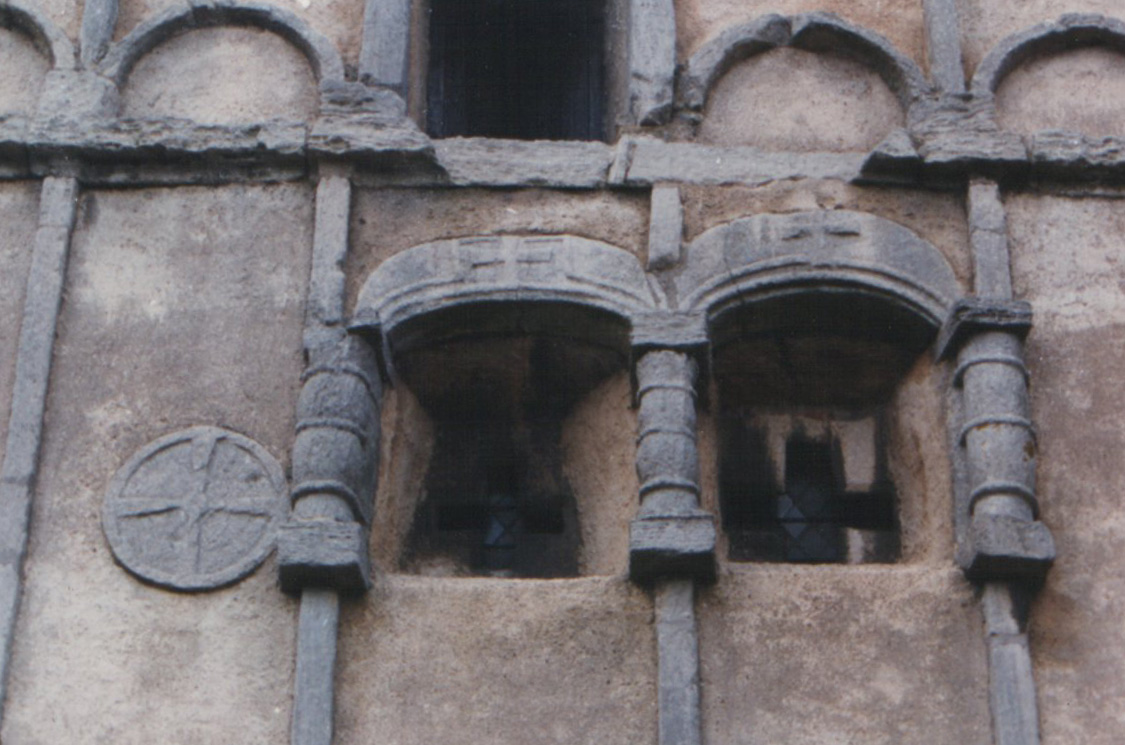
Baluster shafts and lesenes at Earls Barton

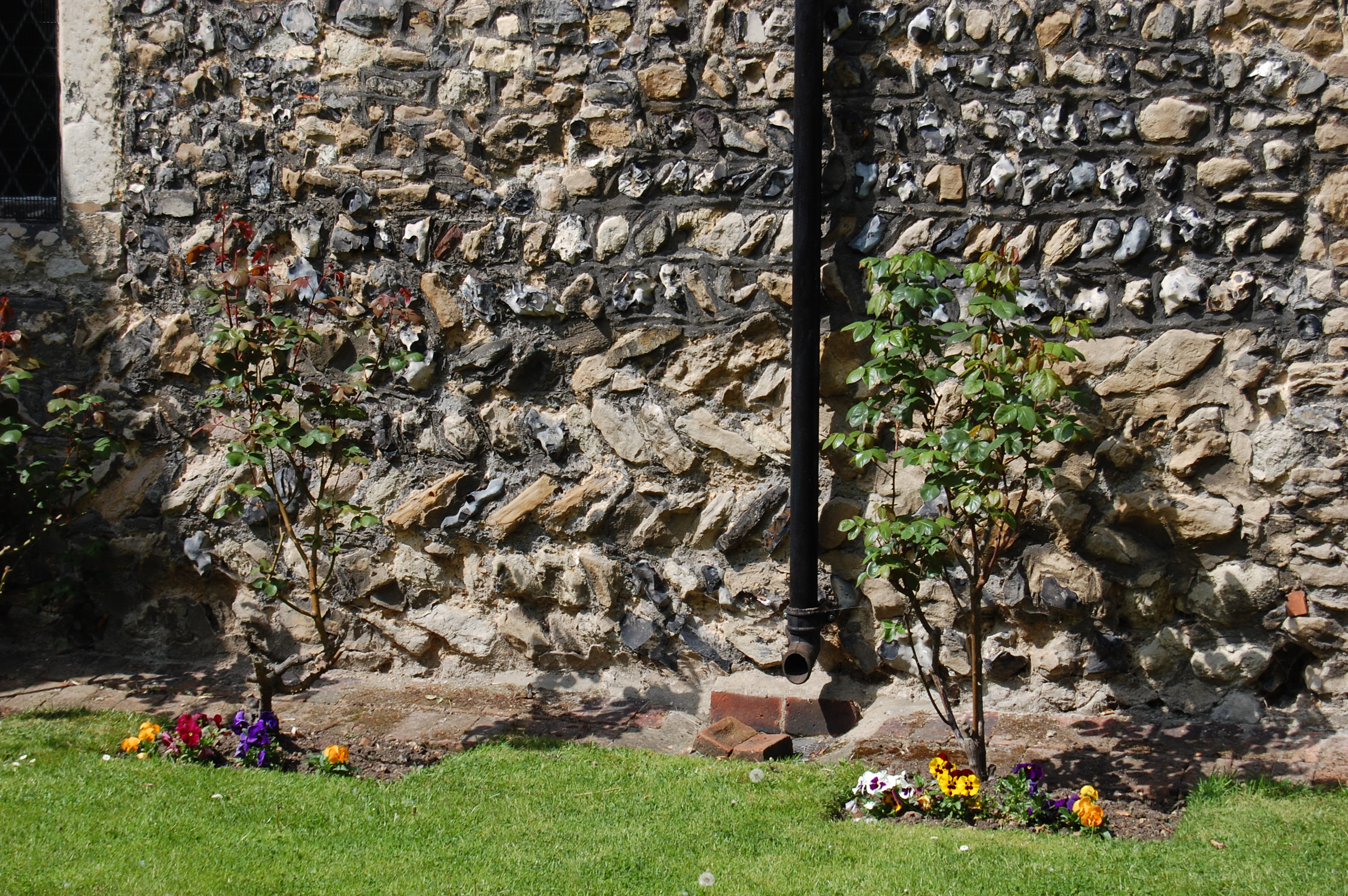
Herringbone stonework at Corringham, Essex parish church

== See also ==
- Anglo-Saxon England
- History of Anglo-Saxon England
- Anglo-Saxon art
- Saxo-Norman

== Bibliography ==
- Hamerow, Helena; Hinton, David A.; Crawford, Sally, eds. (2011), The Oxford Handbook of Anglo-Saxon Archaeology., Oxford: OUP, ISBN 978-0-19-921214-9
- Bede, Ecclesiastical History of the English People
- Clapham, A. W. (1930) English Romanesque Architecture Before the Conquest, Oxford.
- Fernie, E. (1983) The Architecture of the Anglo-Saxons, New York: Holmes & Meier.
- Pevsner, N. (1963) An Outline of European Architecture, Harmondsworth: Penguin.
- Savage, A. (1983) The Anglo-Saxon Chronicles, London.
- Taylor, H. M. and J. (1965–1978) Anglo-Saxon Architecture, Cambridge.
