= St Mary's Church, Breamore =

Saxon parish church in Hampshire

Coordinates: 50°58′09″N 1°46′59″W

- St Mary's Church, Breamore
- OS grid reference: SU 15328 18896
- Location: Breamore, Hampshire, England
- Denomination: Anglican
- Previous denomination: Roman Catholic

History
- Founded: 10th or 11th century
- Dedication: St Mary
- Earlier dedication: St Mary and St Michael

Architecture
- Functional status: Active
- Heritage designation: Grade I listed
- Designated: 30 September 1964
- Style: Anglo-Saxon

Specifications
- Length: c.108ft.
- Width: c. 54ft. across transepts
- Materials: Flint

Administration
- Archdiocese: Canterbury
- Diocese: Winchester

St Mary's Church is an Anglican parish church in the village of Breamore, Hampshire. The building is a Grade I listed building and an important and well-preserved example of Anglo-Saxon architecture, which also retains original inscriptions and sculpture.

== History ==
The foundation of the church is unrecorded, but on architectural evidence it was probably c. 1000. Breamore Priory was founded nearby in the early 12th-century by Baldwin de Redvers and his uncle Hugh de Redvers, and eclipsed the old church, having its advowson, or patronage. In the 14th century, the church was dedicated to both St Mary and St Michael, though now the dedication is solely to Mary.

== Architecture ==
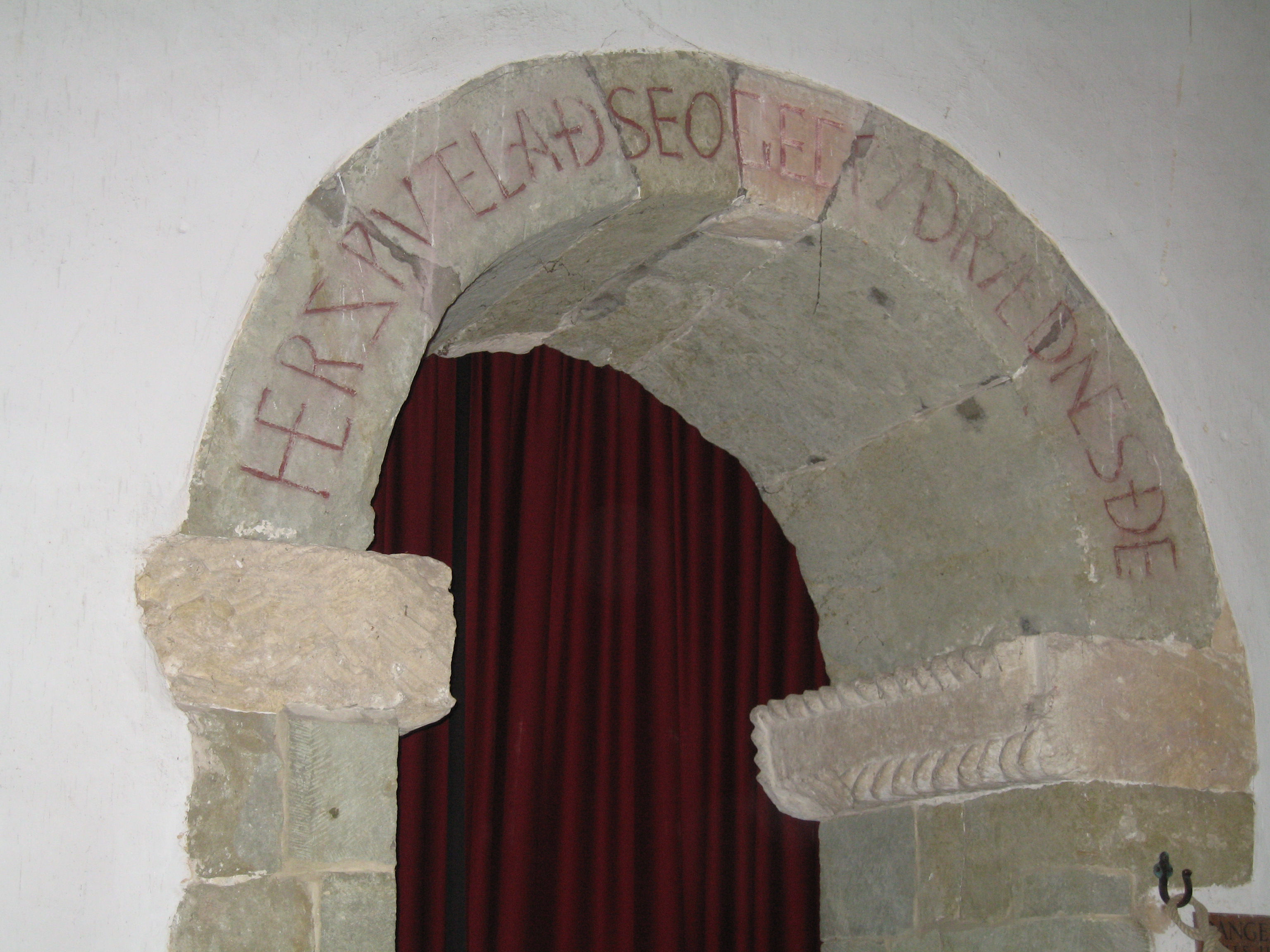
The south porticus arch and inscription.

The building is cruciform, with a squat central tower and a nave of the same width, while the chancel and transept (technically a porticus) are narrower, following the early Christian tradition. The north porticus has been destroyed, as has another to the west of the nave. The proportions are roughly based on a unit of 27 feet, which gives the external widths of the nave and tower, and the length of the chancel, while the length of the nave and the span of the transepts are multiples thereof. The construction is of herringbone flint, with unusually thin walls. Surviving Saxon features include double-splayed windows, lesenes (pilaster strips) and long-and-short work. There is also an original narrow archway leading to the south porticus. It bears a carved inscription, reading "HER SPVTELAĐ SEO GECPYDRÆDNES ĐE", which translates as "Here the covenant is made plain to thee".

The remains of the rood.

The tower has a later timber top, while the chancel was largely rebuilt in the 14th century. There was further alteration in the later Middle Ages, including the tower arches and several windows. The south porch is a 12th century addition, the only extension to the original plan. It has a parvise, or upper room, of which the floor is now missing. The walls retain fragmentary medieval wall paintings, including a depiction of the suicide of Judas, which complemented the carved stone Saxon rood, or crucifixion. This is a large piece of Saxon sculpture, similar to those at nearby Romsey and Headbourne Worthy. It was badly defaced after the Reformation, with only the outlines of the figures and the later painted background surviving. These are enough to show that the sculpture was unusually expressive for the period, with the crucified Christ shown bent and suffering rather than triumphant, characteristics more associated with the Gothic sculpture of the 13th and 14th centuries.
