= Reticulated tracery =

Form of bar tracery in Gothic architecture

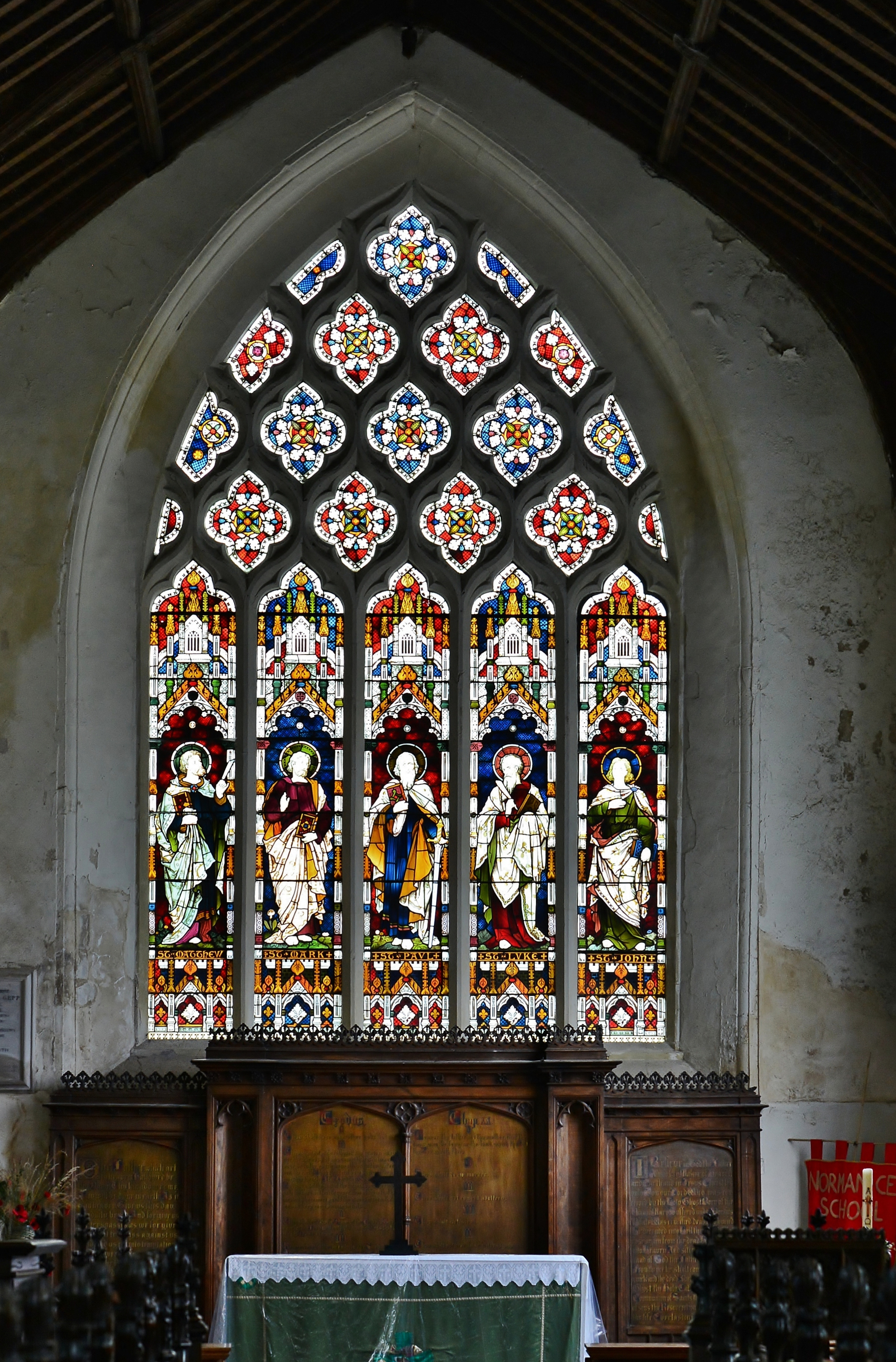
Reticulated tracery in St Andrew's, Northwold

Reticulated tracery is a form of bar tracery used in Gothic architecture, particularly during the Decorated period in England in the early 14th century. The term derives from the Latin reticulum, meaning "net", referring to the net-like pattern created by the stonework. Reticulated tracery is characterised by repeated patterns of ogee-ended lozenges that form a mesh or network appearance in the upper portions of Gothic windows, though some authorities use the term more broadly for any net-like tracery pattern.

== Characteristics and construction ==
Reticulated tracery represents a transitional style between the geometric patterns of earlier Geometrical tracery and the more flowing, curvilinear designs that followed. The defining feature is the use of ogee curves—double curves that combine a concave and convex arc—to create lozenge or diamond-shaped openings arranged in a regular, repeating pattern.

The geometric construction of reticulated tracery follows a systematic process. Masons would begin by establishing a grid of circles of equal diameter, positioned so that each circle touches its neighbours. From the points where these circles intersect, ogee curves are drawn to create the lozenge-shaped openings. The resulting pattern resembles wire netting or mesh, hence the name "reticulated" from the Latin for net.

The vertical mullions of the window continue upward from the lower lights and merge seamlessly into the tracery pattern, with the ogee curves branching from these vertical elements. This integration of structural and decorative elements was characteristic of Gothic design principles, where the stone framework served both to support the glass and to create aesthetic patterns. The use of ogee curves throughout the design meant that every element of the tracery—whether a complete lozenge or a partial curve at the edge of the window—followed the same geometric principle.

The style was particularly well-suited to filling large expanses of window space, as the pattern could be extended horizontally or vertically without difficulty. Whether used in arched or square-headed windows, and regardless of the number of subdivisions required, the consistent use of ogee curves throughout the design maintained visual coherence. This regularity of pattern made reticulated tracery practically suited to large windows, as the repeating elements could be more easily constructed and glazed compared to more complex flowing designs.

== Historical development ==
Reticulated tracery emerged in England during the early 14th century as part of the broader Decorated Gothic style, which flourished from approximately 1290 to 1350. It developed from the earlier Geometrical tracery of the late 13th century, which had relied on simpler circular forms and foiled patterns. The introduction of the ogee curve—generally used decoratively rather than as a major structural member—enabled masons to create more varied and intricate window designs.

The style remained in vogue during the first half of the 14th century, with its peak period during the second quarter of the century. During this time, it was widely adopted across England, particularly in parish churches and cathedral side chapels. The regularity and geometric precision of reticulated tracery made it a popular choice for both ecclesiastical and, to a lesser extent, secular buildings.

By the mid-14th century, reticulated tracery began to give way to more elaborate Curvilinear or "flowing" tracery, which abandoned the regular net-like pattern in favour of more organic forms. However, the geometric principles established by reticulated tracery influenced subsequent developments in Gothic window design.

== Examples ==
Reticulated tracery can be found in numerous English churches from the early 14th century, with a notable concentration in the Midlands and East Anglia.

=== England ===
The chancel of Hawton Church in Nottinghamshire (circa 1320) features reticulated tracery in the side windows of the chancel, alongside the church's more famous east window with flowing tracery. The Hawton windows demonstrate the typical application of reticulated tracery in smaller window openings where the regular pattern was particularly effective.

St Mary's Church, Snettisham in Norfolk displays outstanding examples of Decorated Gothic tracery, including reticulated patterns in its 14th-century windows.

At St Wulfram's Church, Grantham in Lincolnshire, the north porch exhibits reticulated tracery on a smaller scale, demonstrating how the pattern could be adapted to different architectural contexts and window sizes.

East Leake Church in Nottinghamshire features reticulated tracery in its east window, showing the style's application in the most prominent liturgical position of a church. Other Nottinghamshire examples include Stapleford, Annesley, Arnold, Woodborough, and Car Colston, where reticulated tracery appears in aisle windows and chancel side walls.

The concentration of examples in Nottinghamshire, Lincolnshire, and Norfolk may indicate regional workshops or masons familiar with the style, though the pattern's relative simplicity also made it accessible to parish churches with more limited resources compared to major cathedrals.

== Relationship to other tracery styles ==
Reticulated tracery developed from the Geometrical tracery of the late 13th century, which had used simpler circular and foiled patterns. The introduction of the ogee curve allowed for more complex designs while maintaining geometric regularity.

The style represents a middle ground between the strict geometry of earlier tracery and the free-flowing curves of later Curvilinear or "flowing" tracery. While Geometrical tracery relied primarily on circles and straight lines, and flowing tracery used uninterrupted curved lines to create organic patterns, reticulated tracery combined curved elements in a regular, repeating pattern.

Like other forms of Decorated tracery, reticulated tracery uses mullions that branch into curved bars. It relates to the broader category of Decorated tracery, which encompasses various experimental and ornamental approaches to window design in early 14th-century England.

The transition from reticulated to flowing tracery was gradual, with many churches featuring both styles. Once masons had adopted the basic elements of reticulated tracery—particularly the ogee curve—these elements were twisted and combined in increasingly intricate patterns, leading to the development of flowing tracery with its characteristic forms resembling flames.

== Regional variations ==
While reticulated tracery was primarily an English phenomenon, closely associated with the Decorated period of English Gothic architecture, the underlying principles of net-like patterns and ogee curves influenced Gothic design more broadly. The style was particularly common in the English Midlands, where numerous parish churches adopted the pattern during the early to mid-14th century.

Outside England, similar net-like patterns appeared in Continental Gothic architecture, particularly in the French Rayonnant style and later Flamboyant Gothic, though they were typically integrated into broader design schemes rather than forming a distinct style.

== Legacy and revival ==
During the Gothic Revival of the 19th century, reticulated tracery was studied and occasionally reproduced by architects seeking to recreate authentic medieval designs. The King's School building on the St Augustine site in Canterbury (1848) features reticulated tracery as part of its Gothic Revival design.

The geometric clarity and regular patterns of reticulated tracery made it particularly suitable for study and reproduction, as the underlying principles could be readily understood and applied. Some Victorian architectural historians and pattern books illustrated reticulated tracery as a characteristic example of Decorated Gothic design.

In modern architectural scholarship, reticulated tracery is recognised as representing the experimental nature of Gothic architecture during the Decorated period, illustrating how medieval masons combined structural requirements with aesthetic innovation using geometric principles.

== See also ==
- Tracery
- Gothic architecture
- English Gothic architecture
- Ogee
- Decorated Gothic
