= Saxo-Norman =

Very end of the Anglo-Saxon period in England and the start of the Norman occupation

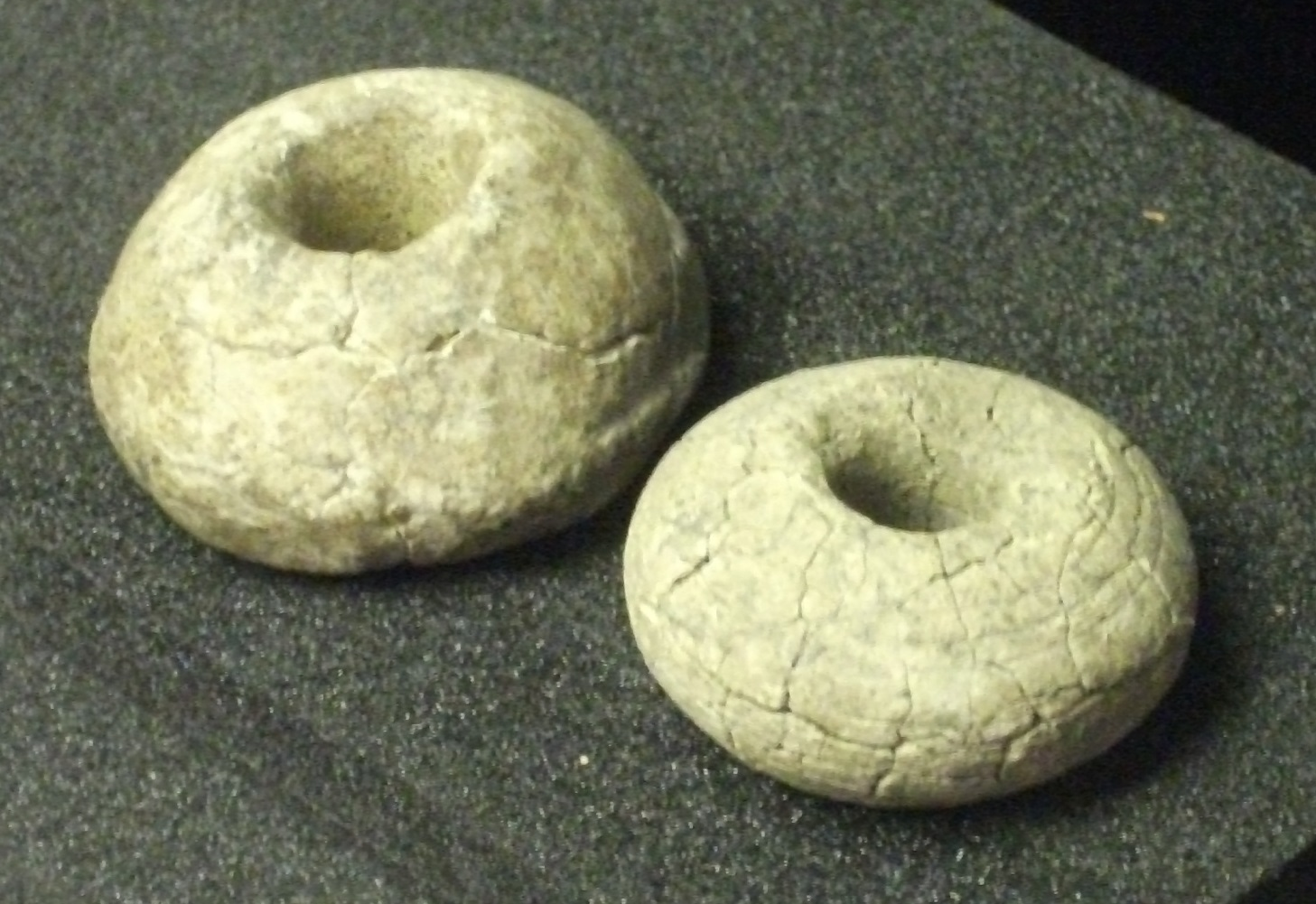
Saxo-Norman clay spindle whorls, on display in the Higgins Art Gallery & Museum

Saxo-Norman is the very end of the Anglo-Saxon period in England and the start of the Norman occupation, typically between 1060 and 1100. Often used to refer to architecture and physical culture, the term addresses the combination of Anglo-Saxon and Norman styles prevalent during the period.

== Architecture ==
In the years before the Conquest, various Saxo-Norman features emerged in English architecture, including "long and short" stonework, "half-roll" features on arches and double-splay windows. After the Conquest, Saxo-Norman architecture was typically applied to smaller buildings, and small parts of larger projects. Major ecclesiastical projects, such as cathedrals and abbey churches, were executed in a predominantly Norman style. At Exeter Castle, for example, Anglo-Saxon "long and short" stonework was used in the gatehouse, alongside arches common to both Norman and Anglo-Saxon styles, and some features borrowed from the Holy Roman Empire. One of the reasons for this would have been the limited number of Norman craftsmen available for projects, and the continuity of local Anglo-Saxon preferences in many locations.

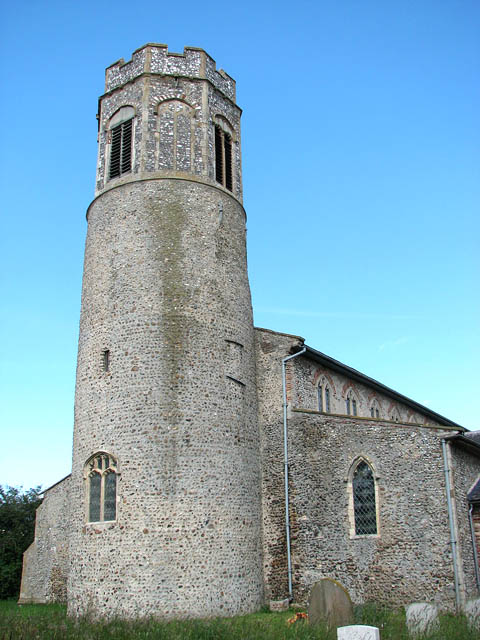
The round tower of St Andrew's, Bedingham, is of Saxo-Norman design

Some Anglo-Saxon architectural features were never used under the Normans, and, as time went by, some Saxo-Norman features began to fade. Old Anglo-Saxon features such as brick arches in stone buildings were simply eliminated from new designs, and "long and short" stonework, "half-roll" features slowly disappeared from use. By the 12th century, parish churches were typically being built in a Norman, rather than Saxo-Norman style. The fusion of surviving Anglo-Saxon elements into the Norman style eventually produced the English Romanesque style of architecture.

The phrase has been critiqued by historian John Gage as being "the architectural equivalent of a middle-aged spread".

== Physical culture ==
Saxo-Norman pottery began to be made in eastern England, including the towns of Stamford and Thetford, encouraged by contact from France and Scandinavia.

== Bibliography ==
- Fernie, Eric (1989). "Archaeology and Iconography: Recent Developments in the Study of English Medieval Architecture". Architectural History. 32: 18–29. doi:10.2307/1568559. JSTOR 1568559.
- Fernie, Eric (2002). The Architecture of Norman England. Oxford, UK: Oxford University Press. ISBN 9780199250813.
- Mahany, Christine; Roffe, David (1983). "Thetford: The Development of an Anglo-Scandinavian Borough". In Brown, R. Allen (ed.). Anglo-Norman Studies: Proceedings of the Battle Conference 1982. Woodbridge, UK: Boydell Press. pp. 197–219. ISBN 9780851151786.
