= Porticus =

Architectural element

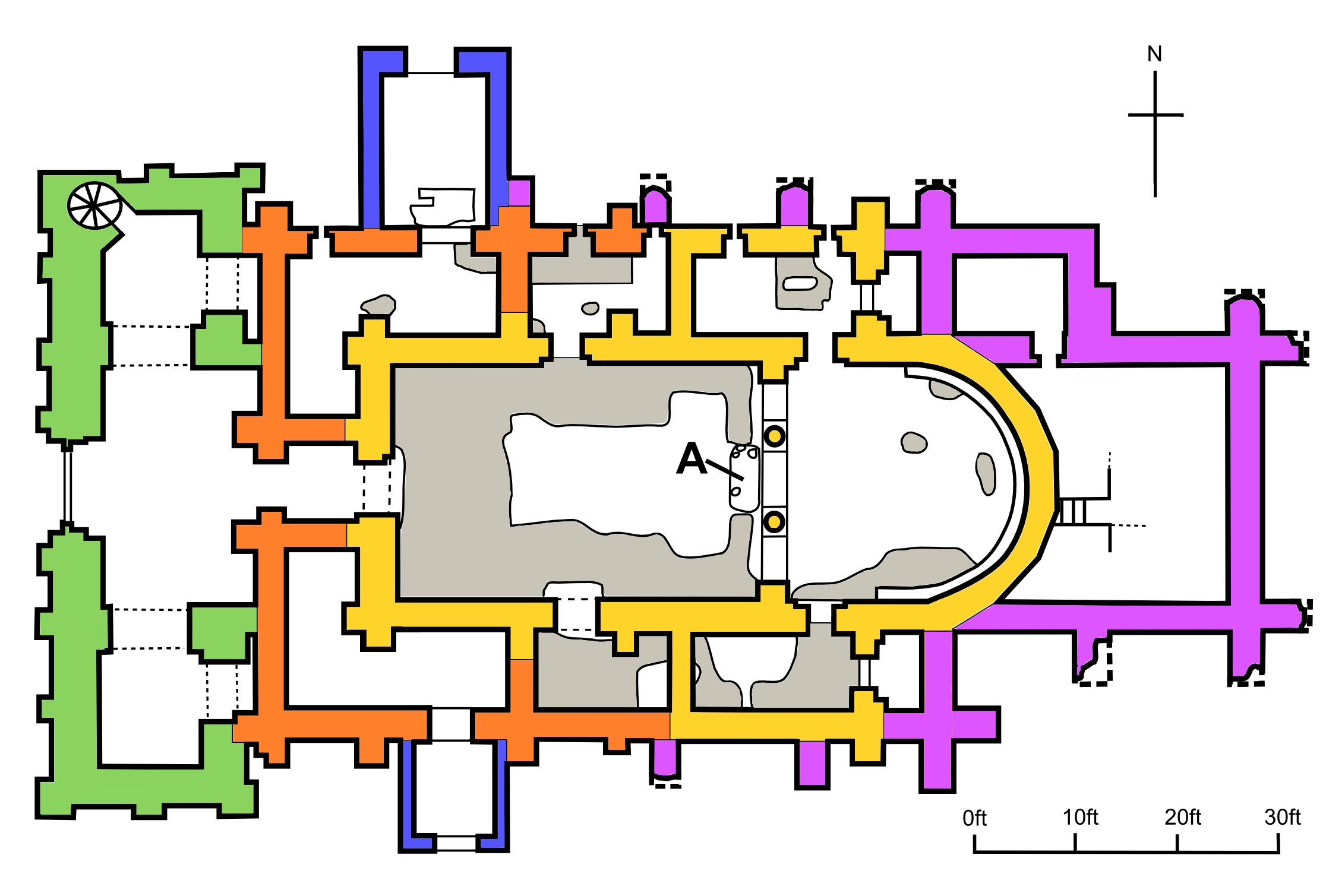
In this plan of St Mary's Church, Reculver, in north-east Kent, the porticus of the 7th-century church are represented by the extensions to north and south from the main structure, which is in yellow. Other colours represent later additions.

In church architecture, a porticus (Latin for "portico") (Note: Most Latin terms ending in -us are masculine and form their nominative plural with -i but porticus is a feminine fourth-declension noun whose plural is also porticus, sometimes differentiated with a macron as porticūs. The English plural form is porticuses, when the term is not simply translated as portico.) is usually a small room in a church. Commonly, porticuses form extensions to the north and south sides of a church, giving the building a cruciform plan. They may function as chapels, rudimentary transepts or burial-places. For example, Anglo-Saxon kings of Kent were buried in the south porticus at St Augustine's Abbey in Canterbury, with the exception of Eadberht II, who was buried in a similar location in St Mary's Church, Reculver.

This feature of church design originated in the late Roman period and continued to appear in those built on the European continent and, in Anglo-Saxon England, until the 8th century.

== Gallery ==
Narrow arch into the porticus at St Laurence, Bradford on Avon

North porticus at St Laurence, Bradford on Avon

South porticus at St Mary's Church, Breamore

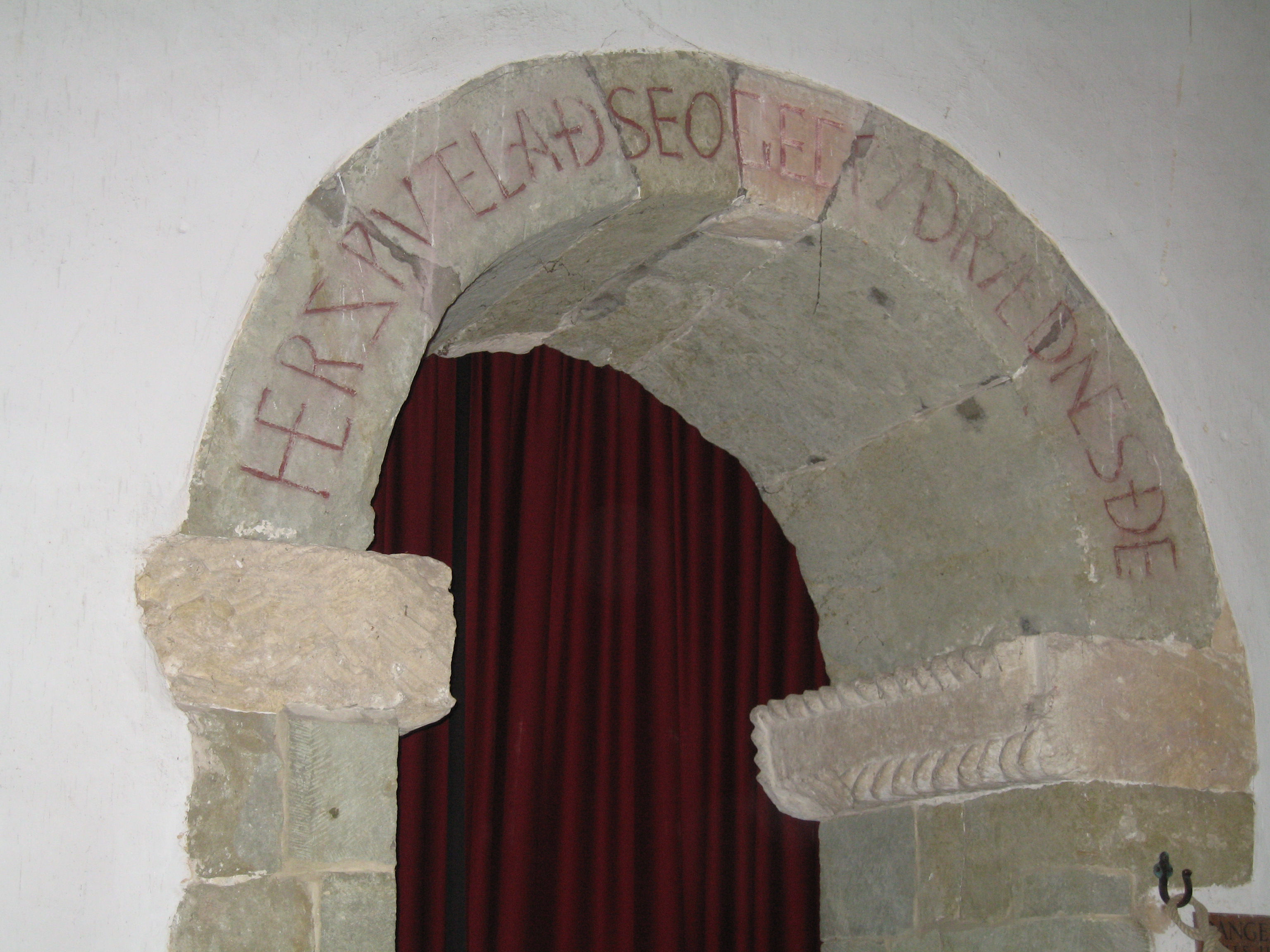
Inscription on porticus arch at Breamore
