= Earls Barton =

Village in Northamptonshire, England

Coordinates: 52.263°N 0.746°W

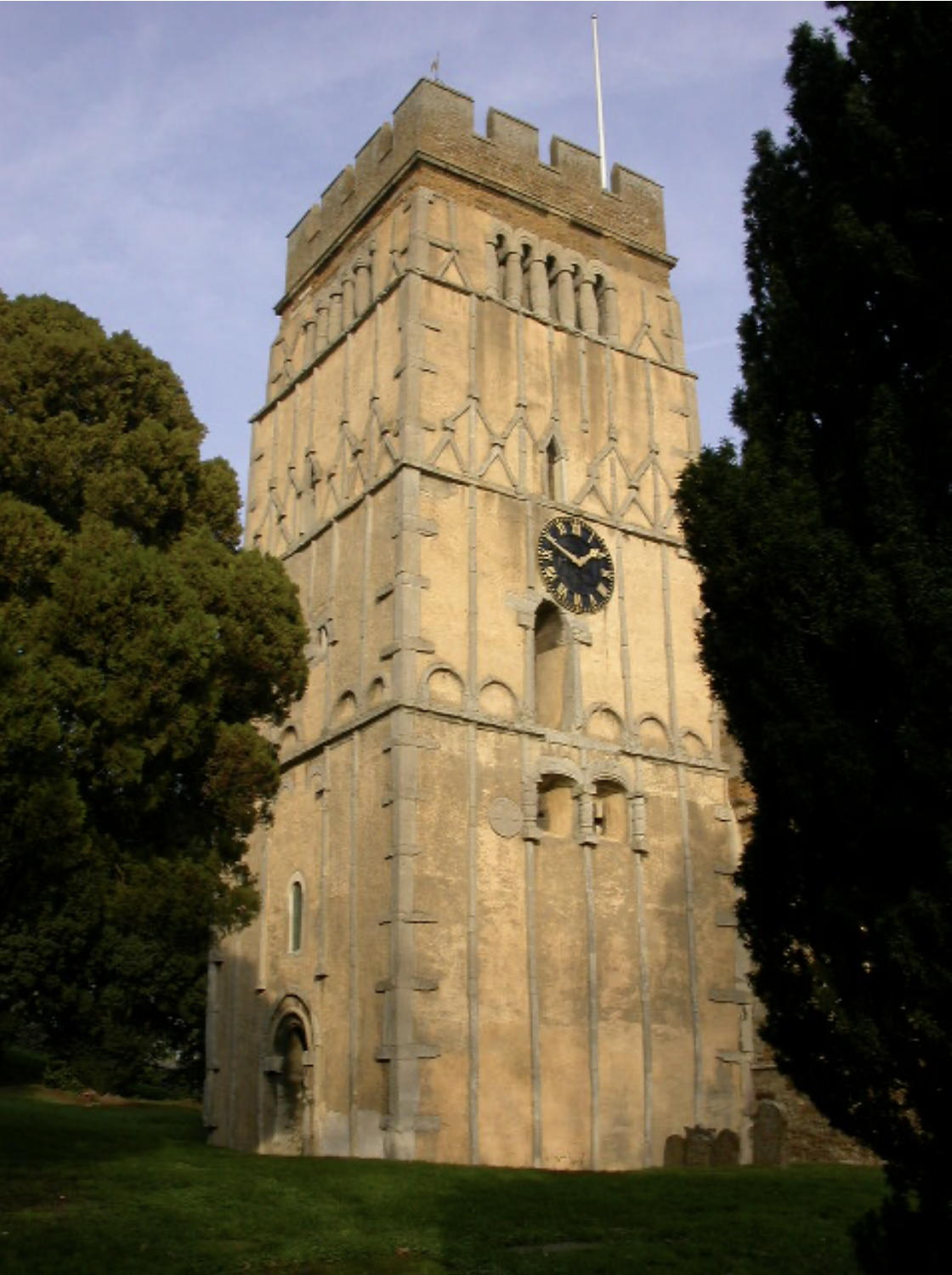
- Saxon tower of All Saints’ Church

- Location within Northamptonshire
- Population: 5,387 (2011 census)
- OS grid reference: SP8563
- Unitary authority: North Northamptonshire
- Ceremonial county: Northamptonshire
- Region: East Midlands
- Country: England
- Sovereign state: United Kingdom
- Post town: Northampton
- Postcode district: NN6
- Dialling code: 01604
- Police: Northamptonshire
- Fire: Northamptonshire
- Ambulance: East Midlands
- UK Parliament: Daventry
- Website: Earls Barton Parish Council

Earls Barton is a village and civil parish in Northamptonshire, notable for its Anglo-Saxon church and shoe-making heritage. The village is in North Northamptonshire and until 2021 in the Borough of Wellingborough. At the time of the 2011 census, the population was 5,387. Earls Barton is noted for its Anglo-Saxon heritage.

== History ==
The original Anglo-Saxon village was known as Bere-tun, or "a place for growing Barley", and was one of several Spring line settlements constructed along the north bank of the River Nene. Immediately prior to 1066, it was held by Bondi the Staller, an Anglo-Danish noble, and senior member of Edward the Confessor's household; around 1070, it passed to Waltheof, Earl of Northumbria.

In 1070, he married Judith of Lens, niece of William the Conqueror, recorded in the Domesday Book of 1086 as owner of the land and mill of Buarton(e). He was made Earl of Northampton in 1071; it is thought these links, and those with the Earl of Huntingdon, later gave the village its prefix "Earls".

In The King's England: Northamptonshire, edited by Arthur Mee, it notes:

It was here when The Conqueror gave these lands to his niece the Countess Judith, and except for the clock and the battlements it looks today as it looked then... It is called Earls Barton because it was the Earl of Huntingdon's barley farm; his house stood where the church stands and the remains of its moat can be seen.

Architectural historian Nikolaus Pevsner disagrees with this assessment, describing it as:

...a conspicuous and quite unmistakable Norman castle-motte. It is so close to the church that it stands partly in the church-yard; on this side it appears to have been cut back to make more room. To the N it is protected by a particularly fine ditch.

He goes on to argue that the castle was founded at the time of the Norman Conquest of England in 1066, and its builder ignored the then existing church, leaving it in its bailey for a later demolition that never happened.

In the 13th century, shoes began to be made from leather bought in nearby Northampton, while the village also had its own tanyard, which remained in operation until 1984. During the 14th and 15th centuries, sheep shearing gave way to the manufacture of woollen cloth, which remained a major cottage industry until the shift to the newly industrialised north several centuries later.

Census data shows that from 1801 to 1850, the village population grew from 729 to over 2,000. In 1880, the Barker shoe company was founded in Earls Barton, and remains there to the present day.

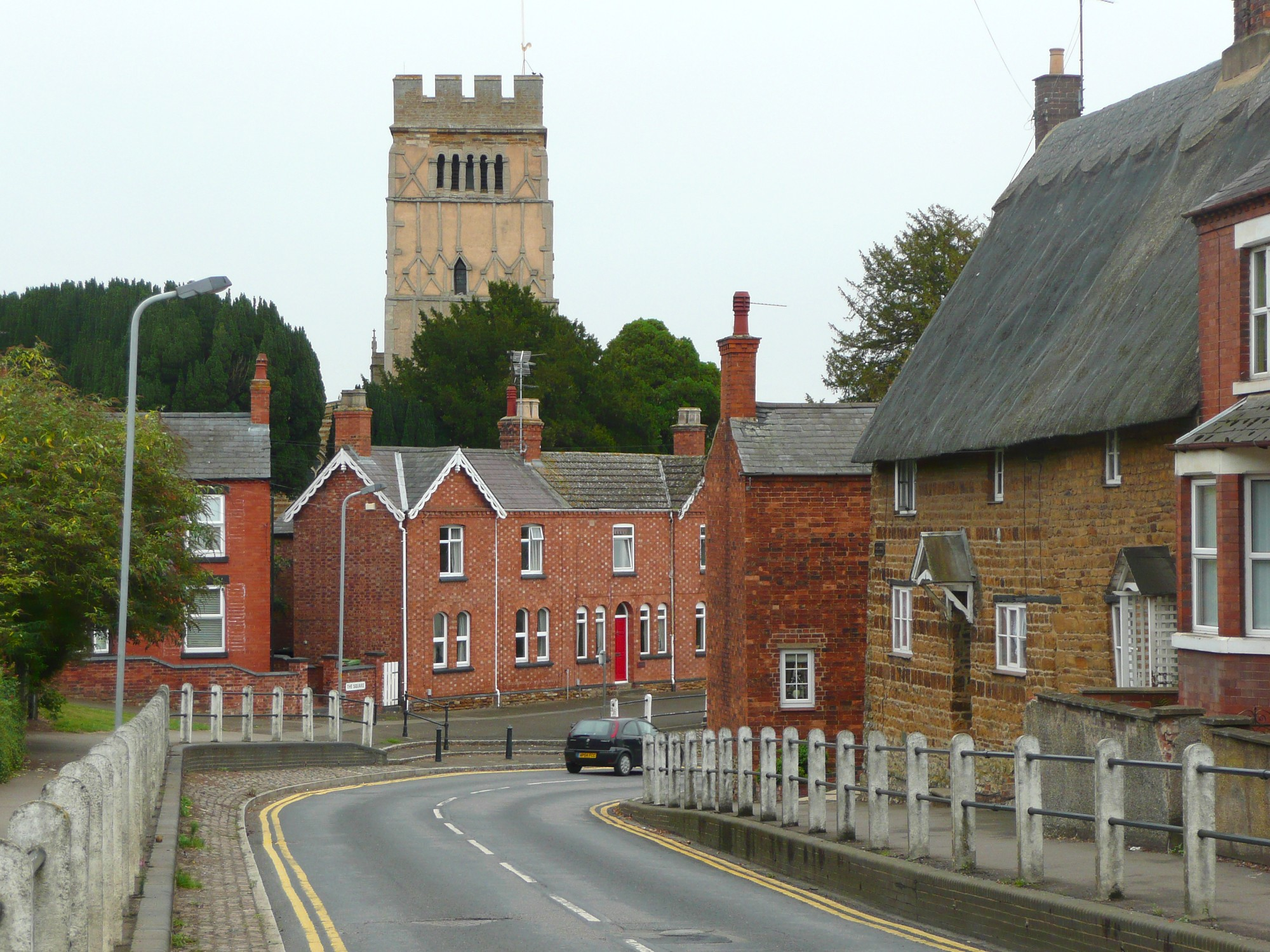
West Street, Earls Barton showing the top of its distinctive Saxon tower.

Between 1913 and 1921, ironstone was produced in two local quarries; the first, situated north of Doddington Road, began operations in 1913, the second in 1916, west of Wellingborough Road. A 3-foot gauge tramway connected both quarries to the northern terminal of the gas-powered aerial ropeway, where the ore was loaded into buckets. It was then taken across the River Nene to Castle Ashby and Earls Barton station, and loaded into railway wagons.

The tramway initially used horses, until a steam locomotive was bought in 1914 to replace them. Quarrying was at first done by hand, using explosives, then steam diggers were used from 1918. In 1925 the original quarry was reopened, not for iron ore, but for the obtaining of gannister (white silica sand). A new 2 foot gauge tramway was used to take the sand to Wellingborough Road where it was loaded into lorries for dispatch. This tramway used a small diesel locomotive. It is not clear how long gannister was quarried but the quarry still appears to have been in use in 1949 and a rusty quarry machine was in situ in the 1970s. The quarried area has mostly been built on but some traces of the system remain including part of a final gullet north of Doddington Road and the remains of a bridge in that road. The remains of the tipping point from the tramway to the ropeway can be seen from Dowthorpe Hill and Milbury.

The village has gone through extensive expansion in the 21st century, with the Wickets development built to the north of the village centre, with another 1,250 proposed houses along the south and north-east sides of the village built by Richborough (250 houses off Northampton Road - to the south of the village), William Davis Homes (250 houses - adjacent to the Richborough development), Redrow Homes (600 houses to the south of the village), and Clayson Country Homes (150 houses to the north-east of the village), alongside the Green Hill Solar Farm - which has proved controversial amongst village residents.

== Parish church ==
The Church of England parish church of All Saints has been a feature of the village for many centuries. Its Anglo-Saxon tower dates to ca 970 AD. Pevsner says that the church tower as built was not originally followed by a nave, but a chancel. He also describes the tower's bell openings as being very unusual, having five narrow arches each on turned balusters.

All Saints' underwent two phases of Norman enlargement, one at either end of the 12th century.

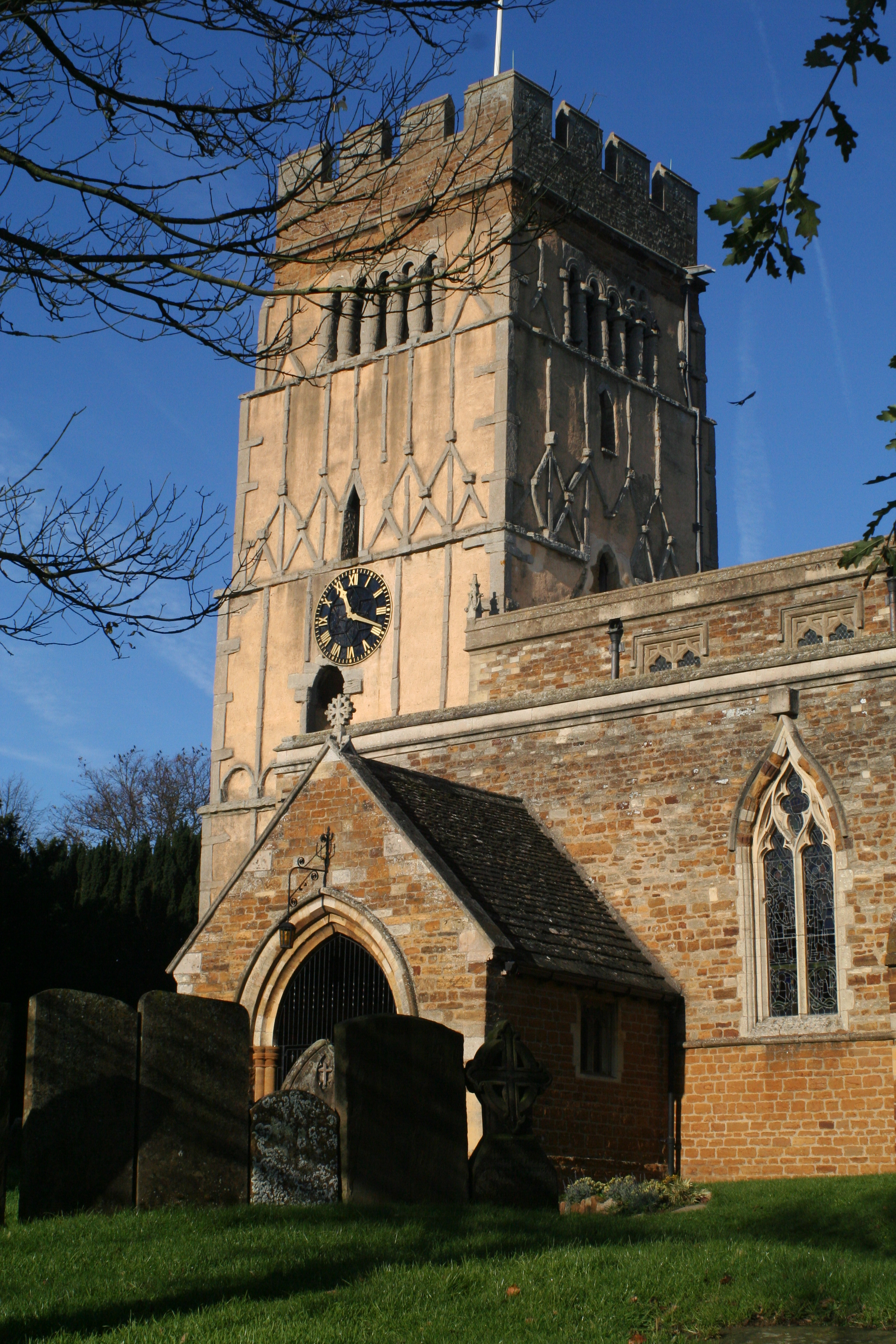
The Anglo-Saxon Church at Earls Barton

Other notable features include:

- a Norman or Anglo-Saxon door and arcading on the western end of the building – this was the original entrance to the church
- a medieval rood screen
- a Victorian font and pews
- a 20th-century inner porch and windows

Apart from the Saxon tower, the church is mainly built from Northamptonshire ironstone and limestone, while the tower was constructed from Barnack stone and infilled with local limestone.

Another feature is that every century from the 10th century onwards is represented in either the fabric or the fittings of the church building. It is decorated with the work of the local artist Henry Bird.

The church was featured on a 1972 postage stamp issued by the Royal Mail, as part of a set depicting village churches. Another Anglo-Saxon church can be found nearby in Brixworth.

There is a Methodist church on Broad Street; the church building is over 200 years old and is home to many village groups including the 1st Earls Barton Boys' Brigade, badminton club and wives group. There were Baptist and Roman Catholic churches as well; however, both have now been deconsecrated. The Baptist church is now used as a children's nursery and St Anselm's Catholic Church has been converted into offices.

== Miscellany ==
The village was the inspiration for the film Kinky Boots and part of the film was shot here. It is based on the true story of a local boot factory which turned from Dr Marten's, their own Provider brand and traditional boots to producing "fetish" footwear in order to save the ailing family business and the jobs of his workers. The village has a history of ingenious industry including the Barker's shoe factory, a woven label company, and the White & Co factory that produced Tredair and Dr Marten's boots until 2003.

In the village's small market square there is a pharmacy run by a member of the Jeyes chemist's family, inventors and manufacturers of Jeyes Fluid. The family also ran the Philadelphus Jeyes chemist chain and lived nearby at Holly Lodge in Boughton.

'Dr Fright's Night' Halloween shows are hosted at Whites Farm near Earls Barton, popular with neighbouring villages and towns.

In snowy conditions Kensit's field becomes a popular attraction for sledgers due to its steep hill.

After a change in policy regarding public libraries by Northamptonshire County Council, in 2019/2020 the local community took over the running of the village library.

A murder that took place in the village in 2019 was featured on the Sky documentary series Killer in My Village (Season 5, Episode 10).

A four-man operation in Earls Barton, built the first Ferrari F1 monocoque chassis car due, in part, to industrial action in Italy at the time.

== Local sport ==
The village has a cricket team, with the first recorded match being played on Monday, 9th October 1871. The club has two teams that play in the Northamptonshire Cricket League. It also has Kwik Cricket, U11's, U13's, U15 and U17's teams.

The local football team, Earls Barton United, were formed in the late 19th century - believed to be 1895. When Northampton Town first formed in 1897, their first game was against Earls Barton United on 18 September 1897, with Northampton winning 4-1. Earls Barton United merged with Earls Barton Football Club (formed as a merger between Earls Barton Saxons and Earls Barton Rovers in 1992) in 1999, and carrying the Earls Barton United name. Currently Earls Barton United Football Club compete in the Premier Division of the Northamptonshire Combination Football League, which is at Step 7 of the English non-league pyramid. They now have two venues - The Grange Sports Field on Northampton Road, and the Pioneer Sports Ground on Station Road.

Earls Barton Stadium - now known as the Pioneer Sports Ground - was a greyhound racing and speedway stadium on Station Road just south of the village. It operated from the 1940s until the 1970s and also hosted Go Karting and Banger racing, and is currently used by the football team - the grounds themselves run by the parish council.

"Earls Barton Motors" was home to Britain's 1957 stock car World Champion, Aubrey Leighton, who was a recognised innovator and builder of stock cars, as well as a racer.

There are also bowls, tennis and field hockey clubs.

== Neighbourhood plan ==
In 2012 the Parish Council helped coordinate the development of a Neighbourhood Plan following the introduction of the Localism Act. A Project Group worked with local residents to produce a plan, adopted after a referendum in 2015. The plan was submitted to Wellingborough Borough Council and will be integrated into planning considerations for the next twenty years.

== Commerce and trade ==
Since 1880, Earls Barton has been home to Barker Shoes of England. A traditional English peg boot maker, Arthur Barker established a boot making enterprise, sending work to employees who worked in workshops at home. At the turn of the century, Barker invested in factory premises in Station Road, Earls Barton and in 1905 his sons joined the business. During the First and Second World War, Barker Shoes received contracts to make and repair military boots. Today Barker Shoes specialise their production in making Goodyear welted shoes and boots with leather and dainite rubber and still employ many of the local Earls Barton community.

In April 2017, the closure of the last branch of a bank or building society within the village was announced. Market Harborough Building Society (MHBS) wrote to customers announcing the closure of the branch located in Jeyes of Earls Barton, stating the new 'local' branches are in Kettering or Rothwell. MHBS cited lack of footfall and transactions as people undertake more banking online as the main reason for the branch closure.

In 2016 the Post Office in the village, a local sorting office and main Post Office, closed and a small branch counter opened in the Premier store on Station Road. Any collection of mail moved to the Northampton main sorting office from the branch.

The closure or significant change of these branches presented the end of an era for Earls Barton; in recent history the village was home to branches of the Nationwide Building Society, Midland Bank, Barclays Bank and Lloyds Bank.

Pubs in Earls Barton include The Stag's Head, The Saxon Tavern (opened in an old Lloyds Bank branch), and The Old Swan. In 2020, during the UK health crisis, The Old Swan provided free stew to the community with home delivery funded by off-sales, joint landlord Paul Dexter receiving media attention.

Whites Nursery operates a market shop and show grounds, with a planning application to redevelop the retail parts of the site to increase retail space. The show grounds host annual and more frequent events such as Car Shows.

== Community life ==
- 1st Earls Barton Boys Brigade
- Badminton Club
- Earls Barton Fire Station
- Earls Barton Historical Society
- Earls Barton Primary School
- Girlguiding Earls Barton
- Earls Barton Library
- Earls Barton United Football Club
- Earls Barton Museum of Village Life
- Earls Barton Music
- Earls Barton Scout Group
- Earls Barton Parish Council
- Earls Barton Tennis Club
- Earls Barton Youth Club
- Saxon Pre-School
- Starfruit Youth Theatre Company
- Under The Tower - Drama Group
- Pied Piper Pre-School
- Earls Barton Carnival
- Earls Barton Soap Box Derby

== Gallery ==
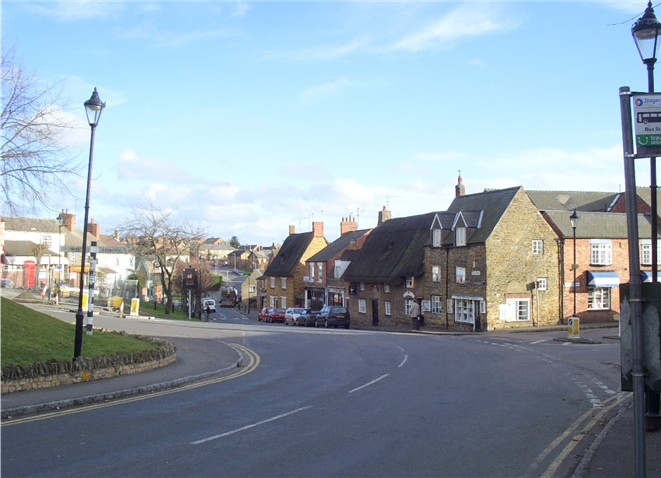
Earls Barton Village centre

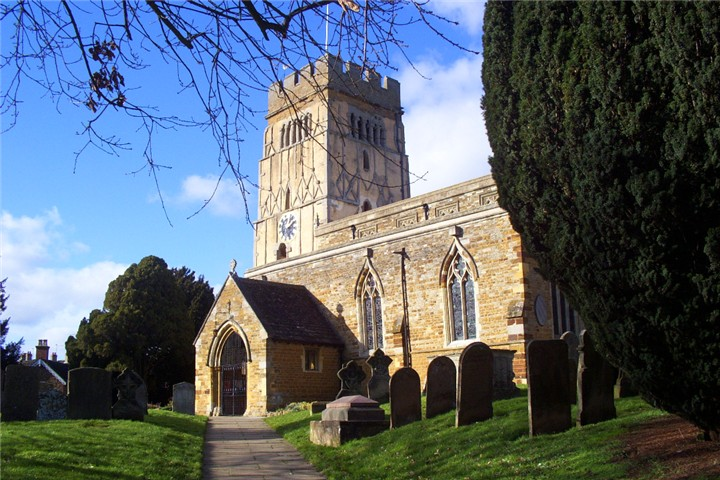
Earls Barton Church

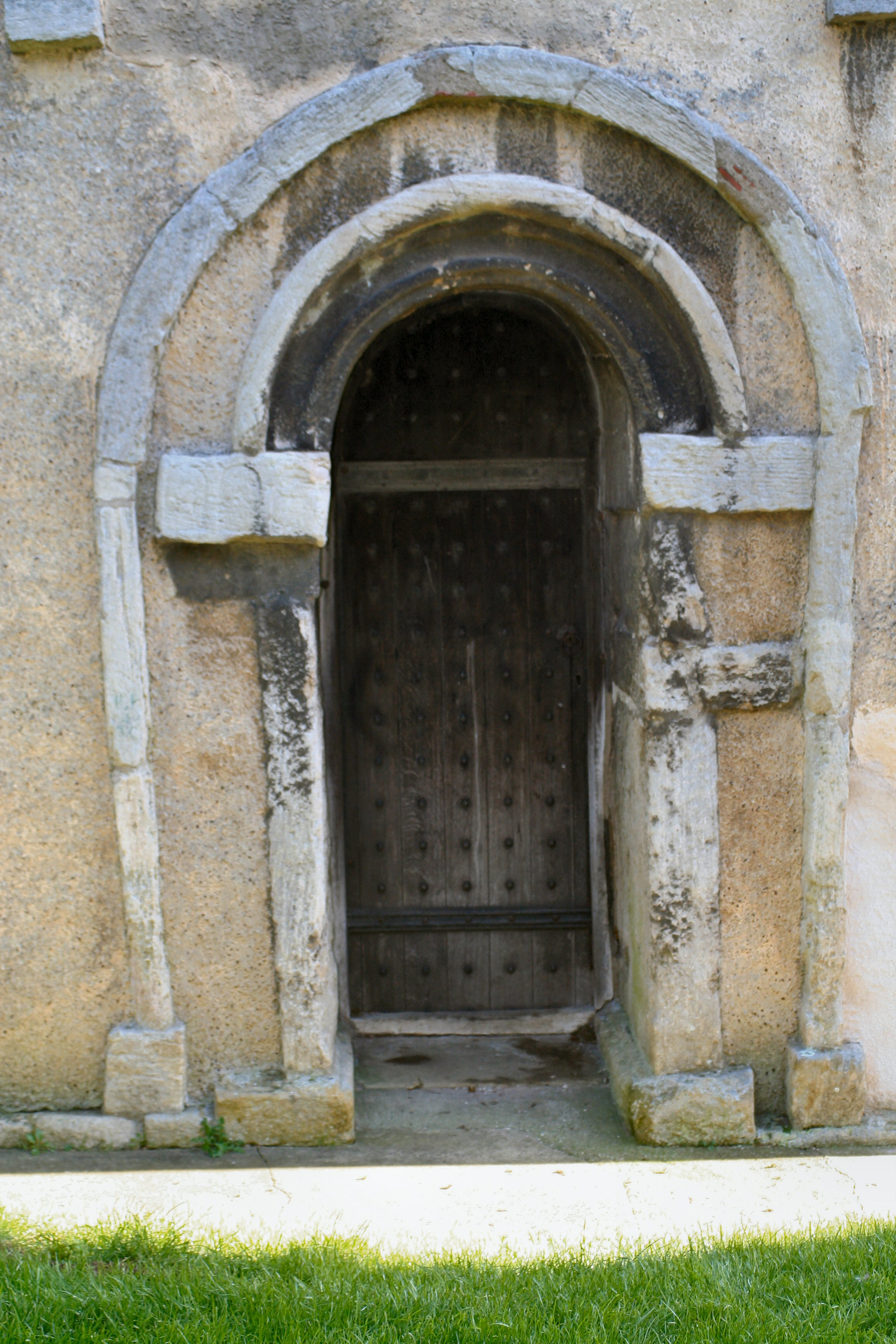
The Old Church Door

== Sources ==
- Palmer, Joyce (January 2002). Earls Barton: The history of a Northamptonshire Parish. Yale University Press. ISBN 0-300-09632-1.
- Pevsner, Nikolaus; Cherry, Bridget (revision) (1973) [1961]. The Buildings of England: Northamptonshire. Harmondsworth: Penguin Books. pp. 195–196. ISBN 0-14-071022-1.
- Rex, Peter (2014). The English Resistance: The Underground War Against the Normans. Amberley. ISBN 978-1445604794.
