= All Saints' Church, Earls Barton =

All Saints' Church
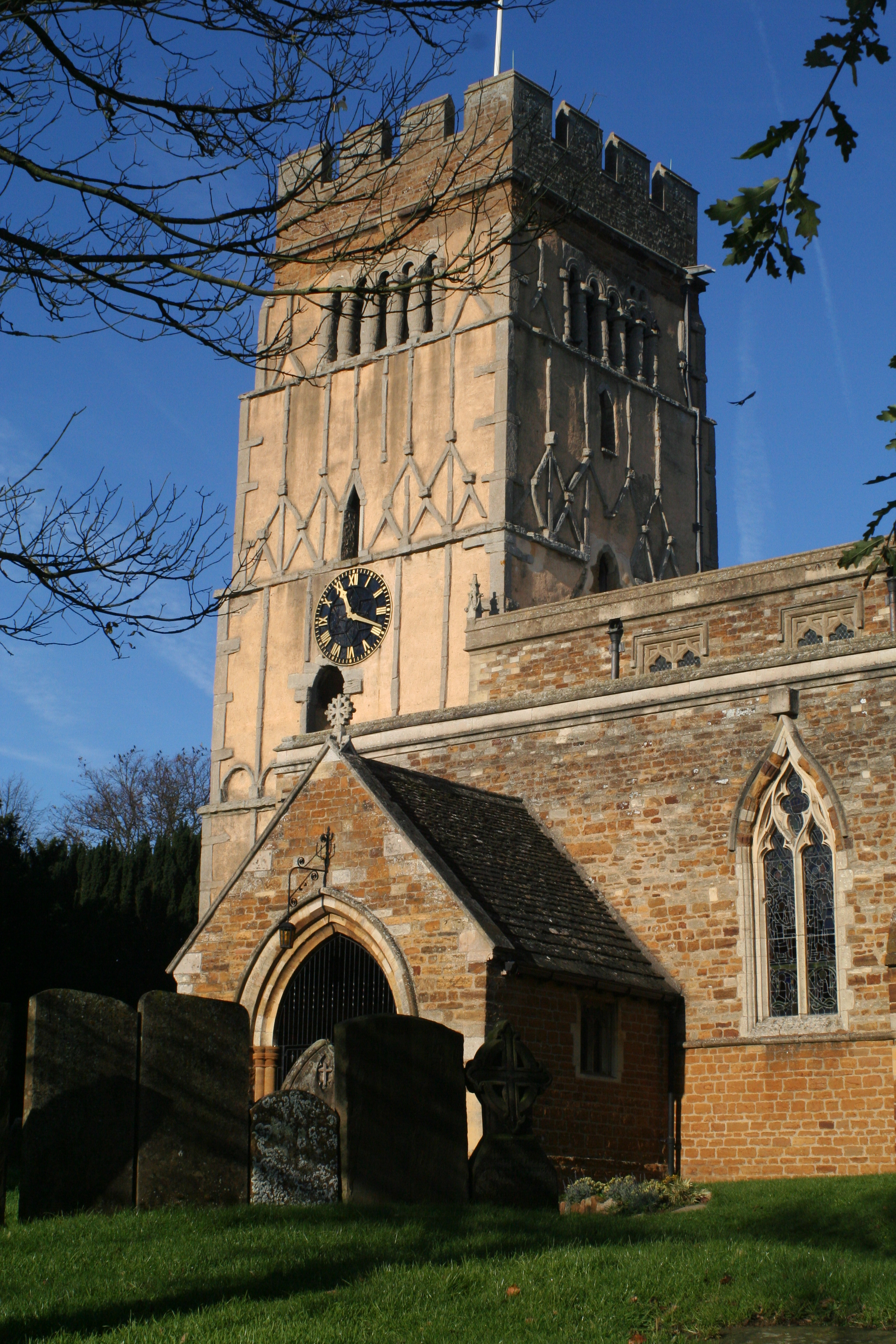
- Tower of All Saints' parish church
- All Saints' Church
- 52°15′57″N 0°45′12″W
- Location: Earls Barton, Northamptonshire
- Country: England
- Denomination: Church of England
- Churchmanship: Central
- Website: www.allsaintseb.com

History
- Status: Parish Church
- Dedication: All Saints

Architecture
- Functional status: Active
- Style: Anglo-Saxon, Norman, English Gothic
- Years built: Late 10th century

Specifications
- Height: 69 ft (21 m)

Administration
- Diocese: Diocese of Peterborough
- Archdeaconry: Archdeaconry of Northampton
- Parish: Parish of Earls Barton

Clergy
- Vicar: Jenny Bland

All Saints' Church is a noted Anglo-Saxon Church of England parish church in Earls Barton, Northamptonshire. It is estimated that the building dates from the later tenth century, shortly after Danish raids on England.

== The tower ==
The tower at Earls Barton was probably originally a tower nave, the ground floor serving as the main body of the church with a small chancel annexed to it to the east, as at St Peter's Church, Barton-upon-Humber, built at roughly the same period. A doorway on the south side of the tower, and originally another opening on the west face, allowed access to the outside. The upper floors possibly provided accommodation for the priest or acted as a safe-haven to house treasures, although it has been pointed out that such towers would have been deathtraps in a Viking raid, with their combustible wooden floors and multiple doors. There is a belfry at the uppermost storey.

The tower is constructed of stone rubble and rendered on the outside, and is decorated with vertical limestone pilaster strips and strapwork. At the corners of the tower, the walls are strengthened by long vertical quoin stones bedded on horizontal slabs, and hence is termed long and short work. The way in which the tower is decorated is unique to Anglo-Saxon architecture, and the decorated Anglo-Saxon tower itself is a phenomenon that occurs locally, including Barnack near Peterborough and Stowe Nine Churches in Northamptonshire.

The storeys are divided by projecting stone string courses, and at each successive storey, the walls become slightly thinner, creating a step at each string course. The vertical pilaster strips continue up the tower, and are interspersed with stone strip arches at lower level and triangular decoration at upper level, in some instances resulting in a criss-cross pattern.

In the 12th century the small Anglo-Saxon chancel, narrower than the tower, was razed and replaced by a nave so that the tower now stands at the west end. This nave was enlarged later in the 12th century and then renovated in the 13th and early 14th centuries. The east end of the chancel is 13th century.

The tower is 69 feet (21 metres) high from base to the battlements.

== Architectural characteristics ==
The influence is very much Roman, and this can be seen by looking at the doors and windows of the tower. At the west doorway, pilaster strips run up the sides and continue over the head in an arch. Within this, there is an arched moulding springing from square imposts. These are decorated with vertical fluting. The jambs are of large flat stones, at right angles to the wall. The form of the jambs is Roman in origin. An example of this can be seen in the Bath House of Chesters Fort on Hadrian's Wall. Windows at low level on the south are mullioned with baluster shafts and arched lintels, and the window apertures themselves are cross-shaped. At high level, the belfry has arched five-light windows with baluster shaft mullions.

The blind arcading is purely decorative, since the arches and triangles spring from string courses rather than supporting them. In fact Warwick Rodwell has suggested that the "hopeless jumble" of the arcading at Earls Barton demonstrates it was mere ornament. Rodwell suggests that the design was based on timber framing but that the parts were then assembled wrongly. The position of openings in the tower makes use of this decoration by fitting within the triangles and pilaster strips.

The use of stone enabled sturdy towers to be built in this period, but the availability of stone that could be easily quarried and carved enabled towers as at Earls Barton to be decorated in such a way. The limestone at Barnack was quarried extensively from Anglo-Saxon times and throughout the Middle Ages to build churches and cathedrals including Peterborough and Ely. It is evident that Anglo-Saxon churches with long and short work and pilaster strips are distributed throughout England where this type of limestone was available, and in East Anglia where the stone was transported.

In 1935, Henry Bird painted the 15th century rood screen. Its upper parts contain butterfly species that are local to the area.

== History ==
To the north of All Saints' Church, Earls Barton, a mound and ditch almost abuts the church. Nikolaus Pevsner supposed that the lord of the manor regarded the church as an encroachment and planned to demolish it. Following the Norman Conquest of England an Anglo-Saxon called Waltheof had become the first Earl of Northampton. He married the niece of William I, Judith, and she was granted land at Buarton, later named Earls Barton. The mound may have been part of a manor. It is reasonable to suggest that All Saints was originally linked to a manor, rather than to a monastery. Earthworks are also present adjacent to the church at Sulgrave in Northamptonshire, where the remains of an Anglo-Saxon hall have been discovered, so churches linked to manors were not unknown at the time of the building of All Saints.

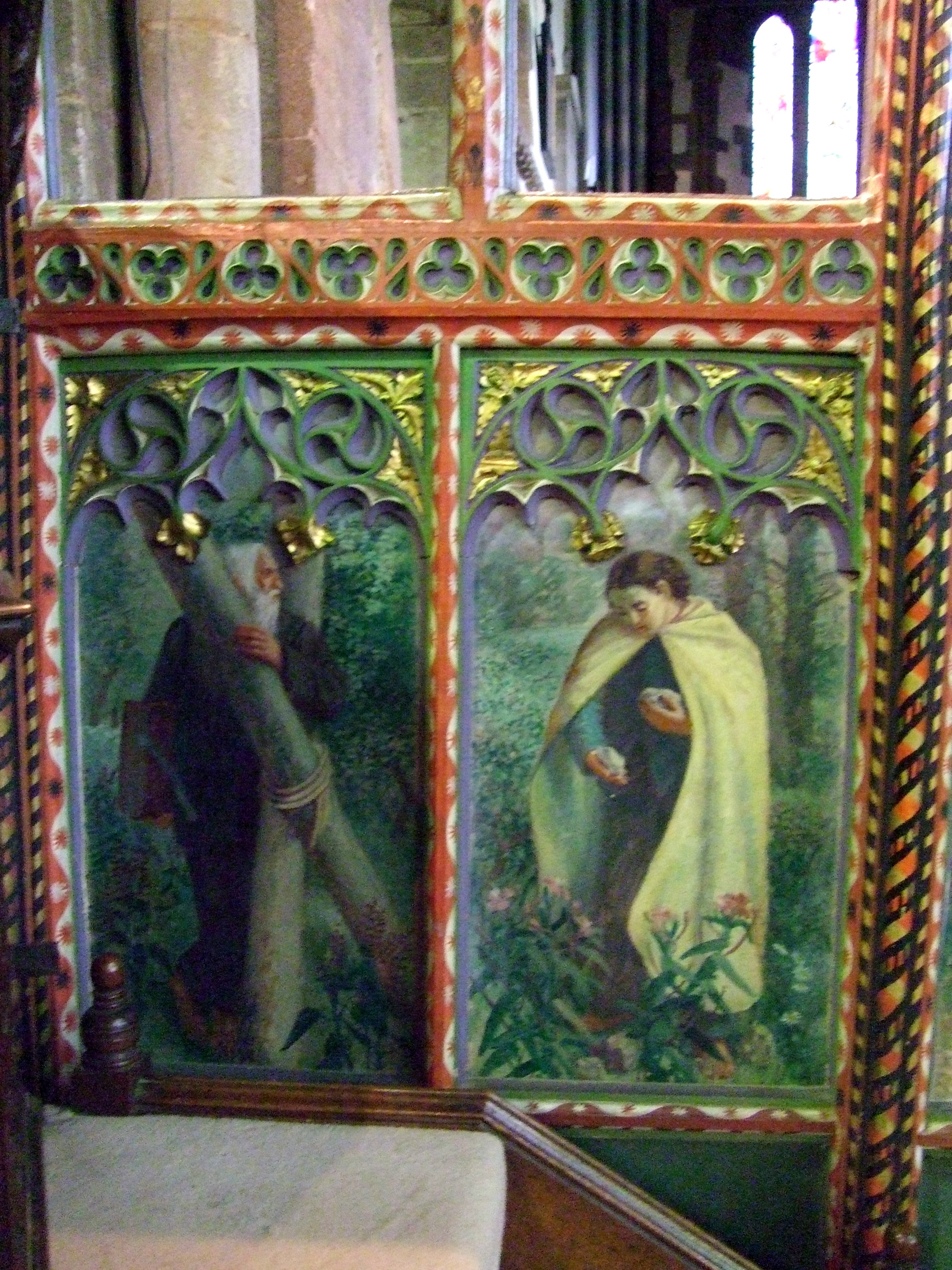
St Andrew and St Stephen on the rood screen painted by Henry Bird

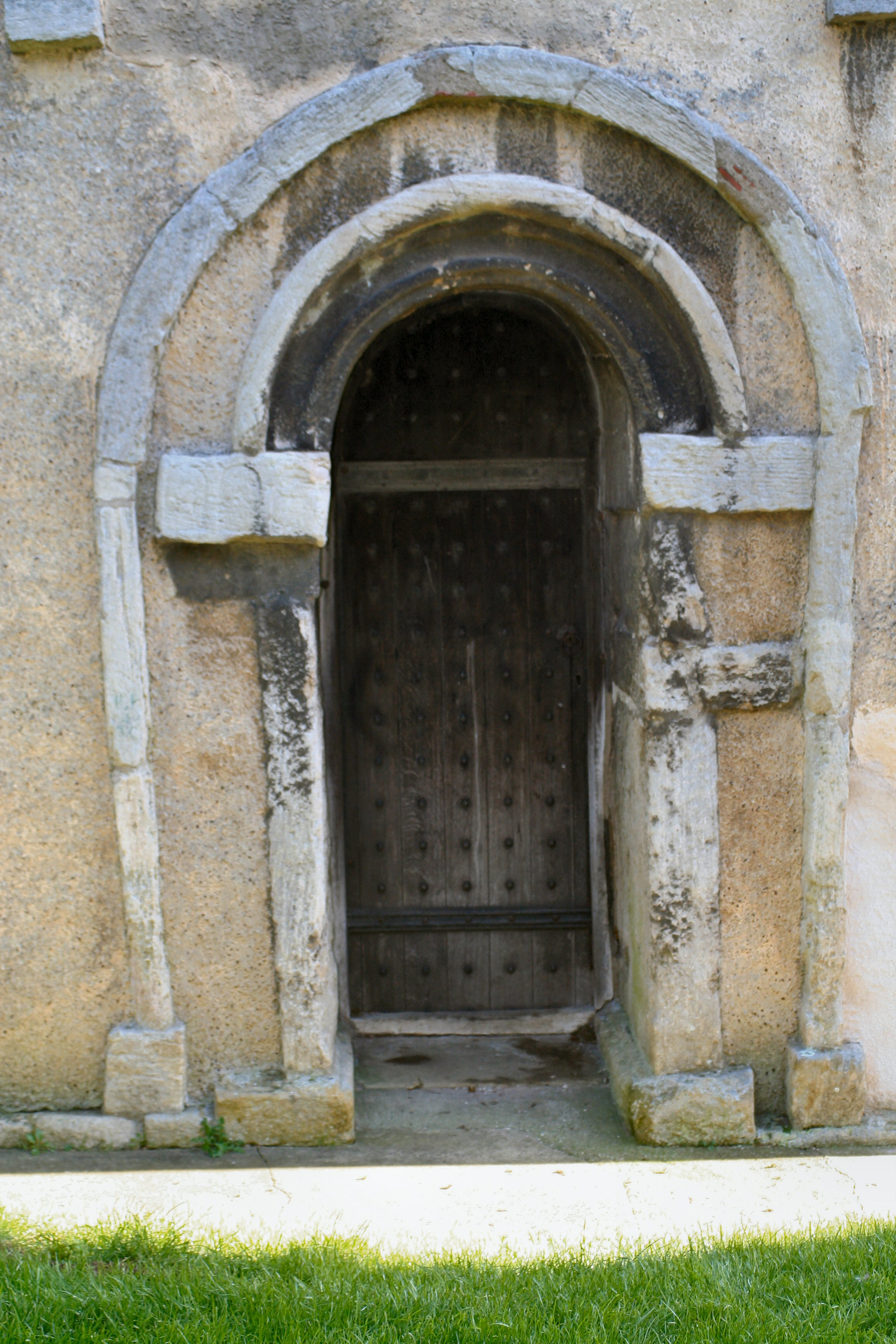
Old door of All Saints

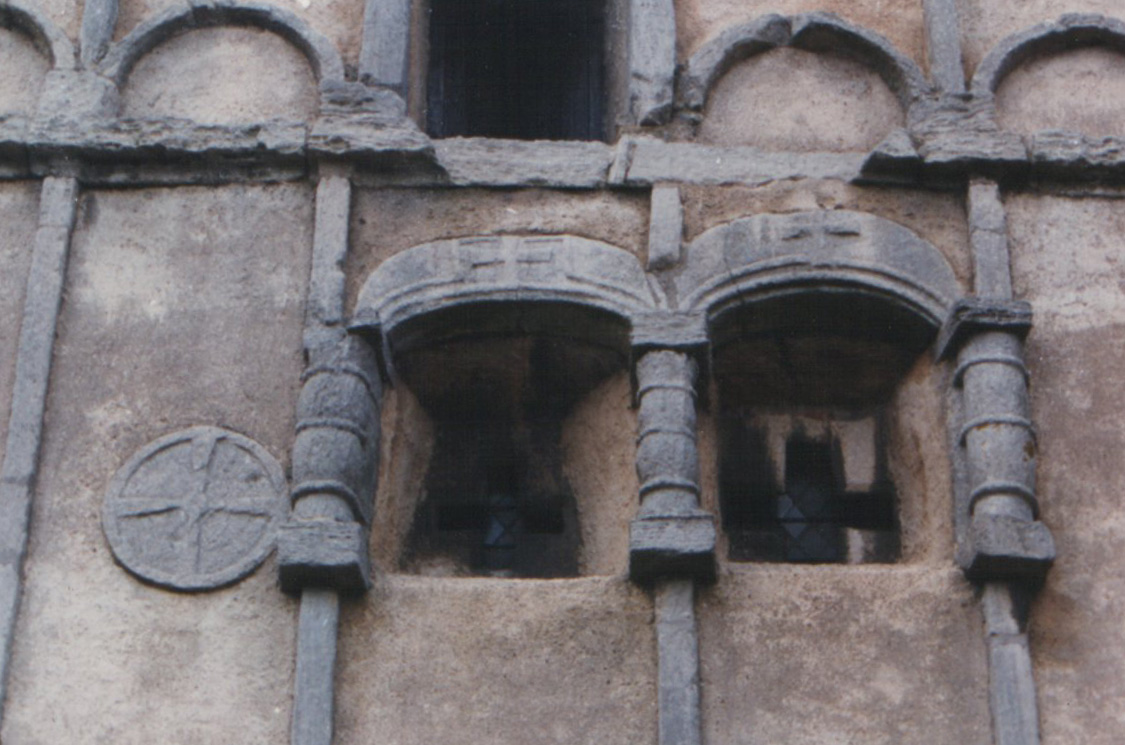
Anglo-Saxon stone carving at All Saints

== See also ==
- Grade I listed buildings in Northamptonshire
- All Saints' Church, Brixworth
- St Peter's Church, Northampton
- The Slapton Wall Paintings

== Sources ==
- Audouy, Michael (1981). "Excavations at All Saints Church, Earls Barton". Northamptonshire Archaeology. 16. Northamptonshire Archaeological Society: 73–86. doi:10.5284/1083112.
- Audouy, Michael; et al. (1995). "The Tower of All Saints' Church, Earls Barton, Northamptonshire: its construction and context". Archaeological Journal. 152. Royal Archaeological Institute: 73–94. doi:10.1080/00665983.1995.11021429.
- Fernie, Eric (1983). The Architecture of the Anglo-Saxons. New York: Holmes and Meier. pp. 136, 186. ISBN 0-8419-0912-1.
- Fisher, Ernest Arthur (1959). An Introduction to Anglo-Saxon Architecture and Sculpture. London: Faber and Faber. p. 57. OCLC 1279628.
- Fisher, Ernest Arthur (1969). Anglo-Saxon Towers: An Architectural and Historical Study. New York: Kelley. p. 45. OCLC 31303.
- Karkov, Catherine E. (1999). The Archaeology of Anglo-Saxon England: Basic Readings. New York, London: Garland Publishing. pp. 195–232. ISBN 0-8153-2916-4.
- Pevsner, Nikolaus; Cherry, Bridget (1973). The Buildings of England: Northamptonshire. Harmondsworth: Penguin Books. pp. 195–196. ISBN 0-14-071022-1.
- Richmond, Hugh (1986). "Outlines of Church Development in Northamptonshire". In L.A.S., Butler; R.K., Morris (eds.). The Anglo-Saxon Church: Papers on History, Architecture, and Archaeology in Honour of Dr. H.M. Taylor. London: Council for British Archaeology. pp. 176–187. ISBN 0-906780-54-3.
- Rodwell, Warwick (1986). "Anglo-Saxon Church Building: Aspects of Design and Construction". In L.A.S., Butler; R.K., Morris (eds.). The Anglo-Saxon Church: Papers on History, Architecture, and Archaeology in Honour of Dr. H.M. Taylor. London: Council for British Archaeology. pp. 156–75. ISBN 0-906780-54-3.
- Taylor, H.M.; Taylor, J. (1965–1978). Anglo-Saxon Architecture. Cambridge: Cambridge University Press. pp. 222–26. ASIN B001OWZWSI.
