= Earls Barton Stadium =

Sports venue in the UK

- The Pioneer Sports Ground
- Interactive map of Earls Barton Stadium
- Location: Station Road, Earls Barton, Northamptonshire
- Coordinates: 52°15′05″N 0°44′37″W

Construction
- Opened: 1940s
- Closed: 1970s

Earls Barton Stadium - now known as The Pioneer Sports Ground - was a greyhound racing and speedway stadium on Station Road, south of Earls Barton and east of Northampton, Northamptonshire, now run by the Earls Barton parish council and also being one of Earls Barton United's two home venues.

== Origins ==
The stadium was constructed in the 1940s on the east side of Station Road and north of a gravel pit and the River Nene.

== Greyhound racing ==
The greyhound racing was independent (not affiliated to the sports governing body the National Greyhound Racing Club). It was known as a flapping track which was the nickname given to independent tracks.

Racing took place on Monday and Thursday evenings on an all-grass circuit and race distances of 280, 470 and 680 yards behind an 'Inside Sumner' hare system. Facilities included a licensed club and bar and on course bookmakers.

== Other uses ==
The stadium was used for Speedway 1949–1957, Go Karting and Banger racing. Recently, it has been used as one of Earls Barton United’s home grounds.

== Closure ==
The stadium closed during the 1970s, but the site is now known as The Pioneer Sports Ground, which is used by Earls Barton United (alongside the Grange Sports Field) and owned by the parish council.
