= Henry Bird (artist) =

English artist (1909–2000)

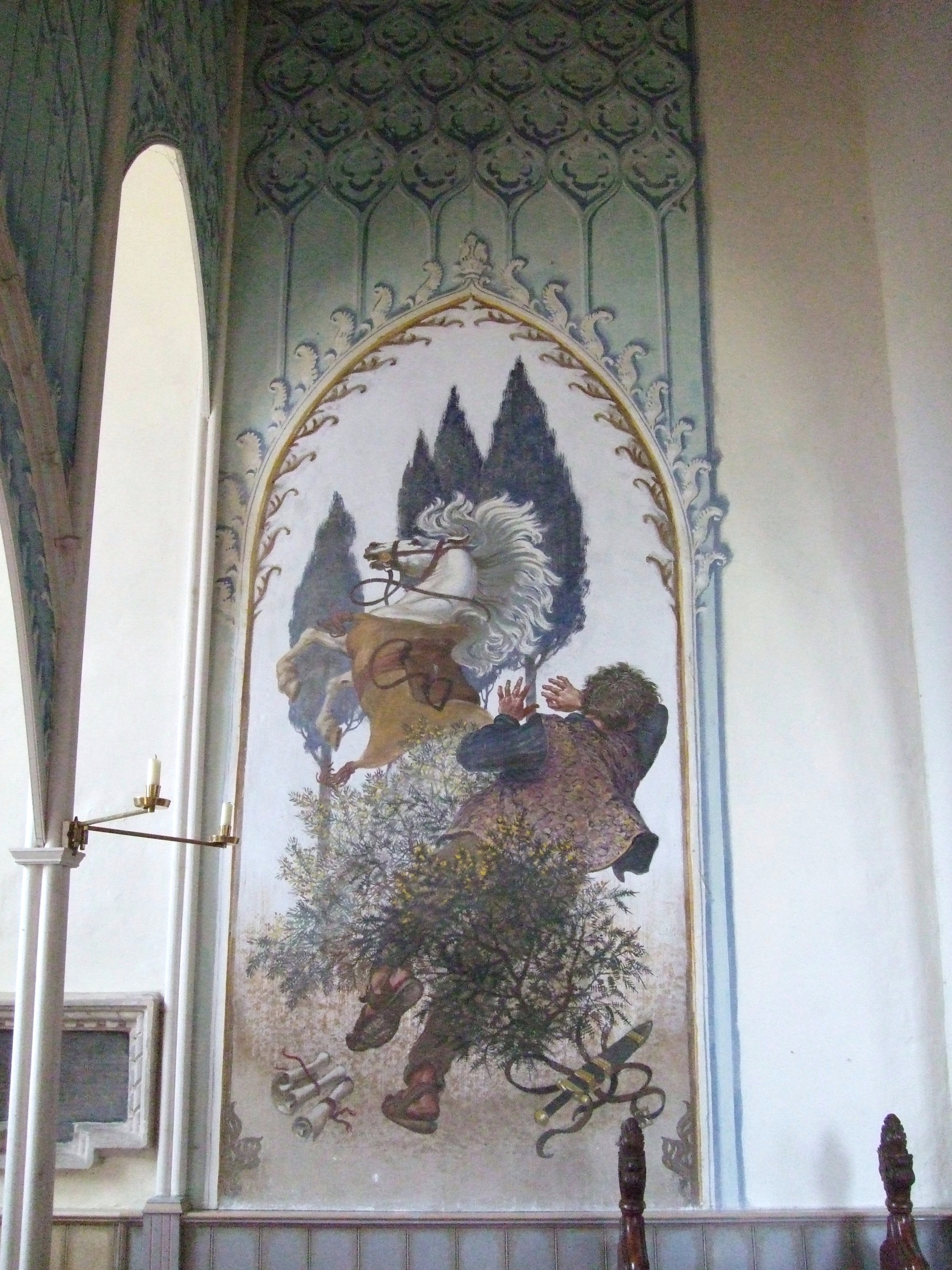
The Conversion of St Paul, a mural by Henry Bird painted in 1973, in St Margaret's Church, Denton, Northamptonshire

Henry Bird (15 July 1909 – 16 April 2000) was an English artist from Northampton who painted murals and female nudes. He went to the Royal College of Art and then designed sets at the Old Vic, Sadler's Wells and Embassy Theatre. He taught art history and drawing at the University College of Wales and the Northampton School of Art.

He was married to the actress Freda Jackson.

== Art ==
He was described in his obituary in The Stage as "One of Britain's most distinguished and versatile artists". The Times noted that he "was one of comparatively few artists to be thoroughly comfortable with the grand scale of ambitious public painting projects."

In addition to his murals, he was particularly noted for his painting of nude women. He draw and painted female nudes "preferably big and beautiful" tempting them with cream cakes, sherry and gin.

Among his works are the theatrical murals on the safety curtains at Ashcroft Theatre (1982) and Royal Theatre (Northampton) (1978). He also did church murals at St Andrew's Church, Kettering, St Margaret's Church, Denton]] (1975–76), All Saints' Church, Earls Barton (1935, rood screen), and St Crispins Hospital, Danetree Hospital, and Northampton Guildhall.

Henry Bird and his art was the subject of a TV documentary by Anglia Television in 1981, and had a posthumous exhibition devoted to him called "The Exceptional Henry Bird" in 2009 at the Northampton Museum and Art Gallery.

He was member of the Art Workers' Guild and the Society of Painters in Tempera. According to The Independent, he was "showed widely, including the Tate Gallery and Victoria and Albert Museum". He was granted in 1983, a Civil List pension for services to art.

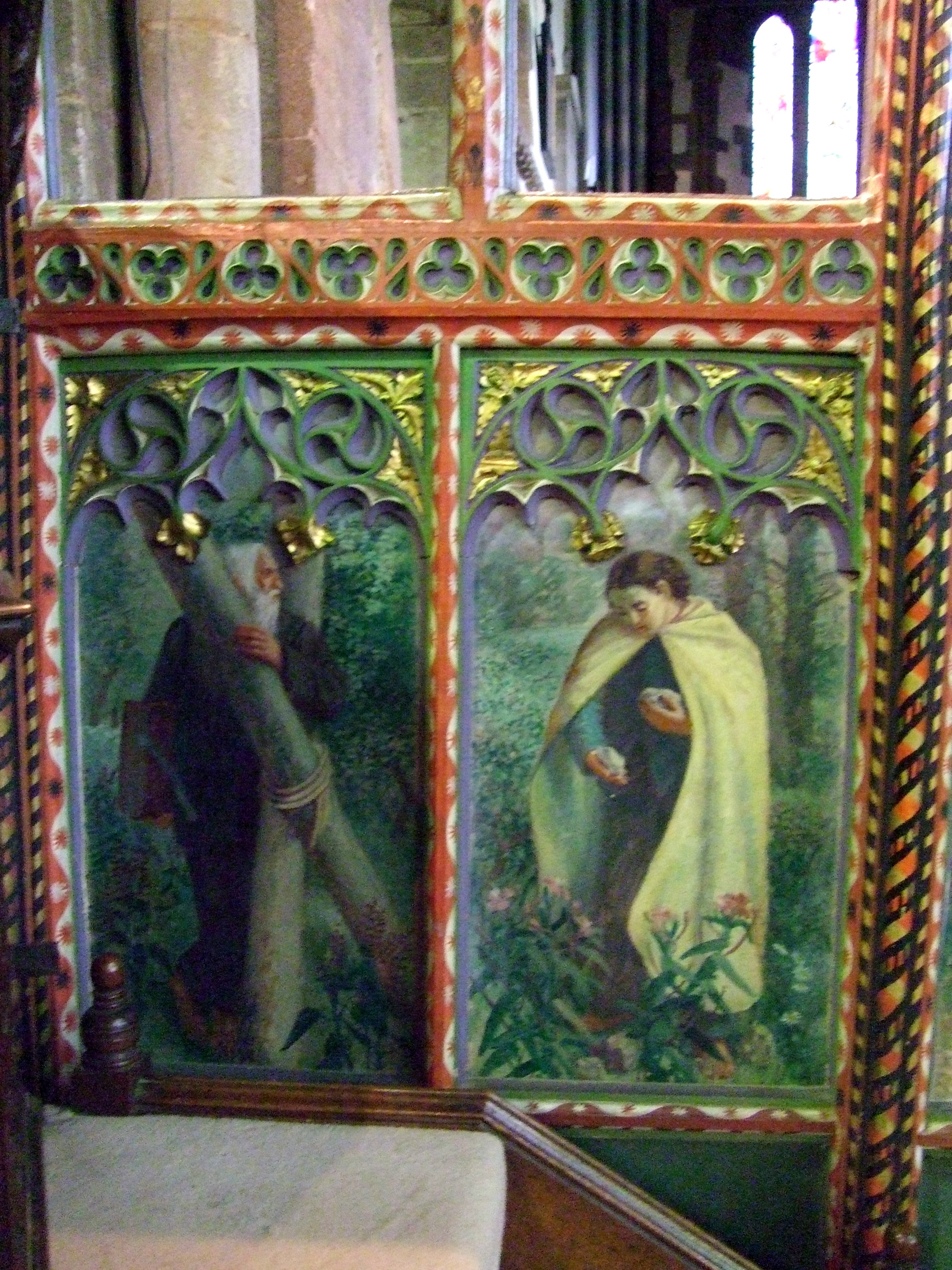
St Andrew and St Stephen on the rood screen painted 1935 at All Saints' Church, Earls Barton

== Teaching ==
He was noted for his method of teaching drawing. His obituary in The Times observed that "he demanded high standards of his pupils, requiring them to study, for months, a brick, a milk bottle and an egg. In their first class with him, students innocently surrendered their pencil rubber, which he then instantly ejected through a window on to the car park beneath."

The modernist architect Will Alsop recalls how Henry Bird taught him drawing with a brick.

"He gave me a brick, told me to draw it and promptly left the room. I proceeded to draw it with all its shadows. On his return he went into a rage and chastised me for destroying the vision with shading, shouting: 'What is wrong with a simple line?' He insisted that I redo the drawing with line only so that I could begin to see the brick and its proportions. I drew that brick for two three-hour sessions per week, line only, for three months. Eventually, he admitted that I had mastered the brick and I was allowed to progress onto the tin can. After 18 months it was the nude model. His vision was one of economy of line and discipline. It worked."

== Life ==
He was born an only child in a Northampton slum. His father Bill committed suicide after returning disillusioned from the First World War. He was a chorister at St Peter's Church, Northampton. He later said that the "beauty of St Peter's capitals, and the skill with which they were carved, helped to point the way to the kind of life he wanted." He initially worked in factories to fund himself as a student at Northampton School of Art.

After this he went to the Royal College of Art where he won "the Painting and Portrait Prizes, the Continuation Scholarship and the Royal College's highest award, the Travelling Scholarship." Initially, he became head scene painter at the Old Vic and at Sadler's Wells. He then was a lecturer in art history and drawing tutor, 1935–41, at the University College of Wales. After a period as resident designer at the Embassy Theatre in 1950 he then taught at Northampton School of Art. Among his students were the sculptor Malcolm Pollard and the architect Will Alsop.

According his obituary in The Stage, "He was also something of a genuine eccentric, cutting an imposing figure with his flamboyant dress sense and usually seen around art colleges and galleries sporting a large fedora hat."

He was married to the actress Freda Jackson to whom he was devoted and committed. Their son, Julian, a psychiatrist, became an actor in his 60s. According to his obituary in The Times, "His first sight of her was her face, suspended halfway up the stage curtain, painted green as a witch in a production of Macbeth at the Royal Theatre, Northampton. With typical decisiveness he said: 'That's the woman for me.'" From 1960, Bird resided in Hardingstone House, Hardingstone.
