= Ashcroft Theatre =

Theatre within the Fairfield Halls, Croydon, London, England

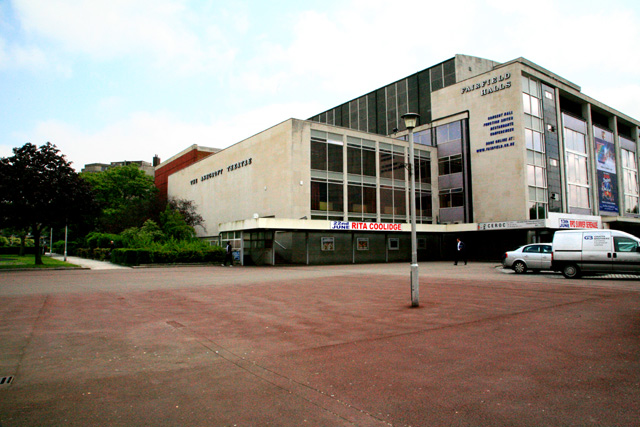
- Interactive map of Ashcroft Theatre
- Address: Park Lane, Croydon; London; United Kingdom
- Coordinates: 51.3722°N 0.0953°W
- Owner: Croydon London Borough Council
- Operator: Fairfield Halls
- Capacity: 798

Website
- www.fairfield.co.uk

The Ashcroft Theatre is a theatre located within the Fairfield Halls, Croydon, South London. The theatre was named after Croydon-born Dame Peggy Ashcroft and is a proscenium theatre with a stepped auditorium. The mural on its fire curtain is by the artist Henry Bird. A variety of productions are held throughout the year such as drama, ballet, opera and pantomime. The venue has a seating capacity of 763 and can be converted into a cinema as it has a large screen giving full Cinemascope and standard film format.

The Ashcroft Theatre was opened on 5 November 1962 by Dame Peggy Ashcroft. The opening ceremony included the reading of a monologue specially penned by Sir John Betjeman called ‘Local Girl Makes Good'. The first play was ‘Royal Gambit' starring Dulcie Gray. Those to have trodden the boards at The Ashcroft Theatre include Richard Todd, Rex Harrison and Dame Peggy herself.

The auditorium is on two tiers with the stalls heavily raked. The front of the circle is unadorned and the straight walls have natural finishes. The stage, with false proscenium, is well equipped with 30 single purchase counterweight sets for flying, and an orchestra pit on a hydraulic lift which can accommodate up to 16 players. Alterations to the forestage were undertaken to lessen the barrier provided by the original Juliet balcony and side door structures.

The theatre closed in 2016 for renovation work on the Fairfield Halls, and reopened in September 2019. During the refurbishment, the centre aisles of the theatre were removed to create a Continental Auditorium seating arrangement, increasing capacity to 798 without kills. Further works in January 2020 replaced the recycled seating from before the renovation works with new grey seating, creating a much more modern look.

== Fire curtain ==
Safety curtains date from the days of gas lighting and were meant to stop a fire onstage or backstage spreading to the auditorium. The Ashcroft Curtain was painted in 1982 by Henry Bird, a Northampton-based artist famous for his murals and curtains. He died in 2000 aged 90.

There were many details, symbols and meanings in the curtain and they included references to the days of the Croydon Fair, the travelling players, famous artistic Croydonians and old English customs.

After the theatre re-opened in 2019, it did so without the iconic safety curtain, which did not survive the asbestos removal works.
