= Denton, Northamptonshire =

Village in Northamptonshire, England

Coordinates: 52.209°N 0.779°W

Denton
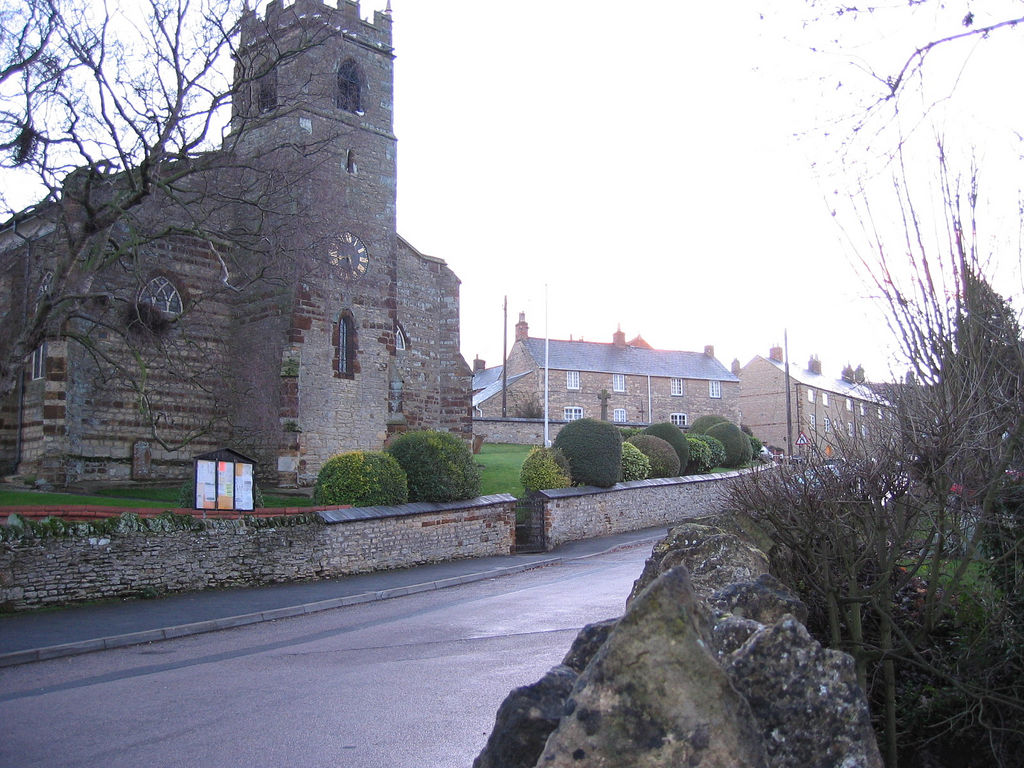
- St Margaret's parish church

- Location within Northamptonshire
- Population: 767 (2001 census); 739 (2011 Census)
- OS grid reference: SP8357
  - London: 63 miles (101 km)
- Civil parish: Denton
- Unitary authority: West Northamptonshire
- Ceremonial county: Northamptonshire
- Region: East Midlands
- Country: England
- Sovereign state: United Kingdom
- Post town: Northampton
- Postcode district: NN7
- Dialling code: 01604
- Police: Northamptonshire
- Fire: Northamptonshire
- Ambulance: East Midlands
- UK Parliament: Northampton South
- Website: Denton Village Northampton

Denton is a small village and civil parish on the A428 road about 6 miles (10 km) south-east of Northampton. It had a pub, the Red Lion which is now as of 2024 an Indian restaurant Mooche Walla, a village hall, a Church of England parish church, a surgery and a primary school.

The villages name probably means, 'farm/settlement connected with Dod(d)a/Dud(d)a'.

The 2001 census recorded the parish population as 767, decreasing to 739 at the 2011 census before increasing to 744 in the 2021 census.

== Parish church ==
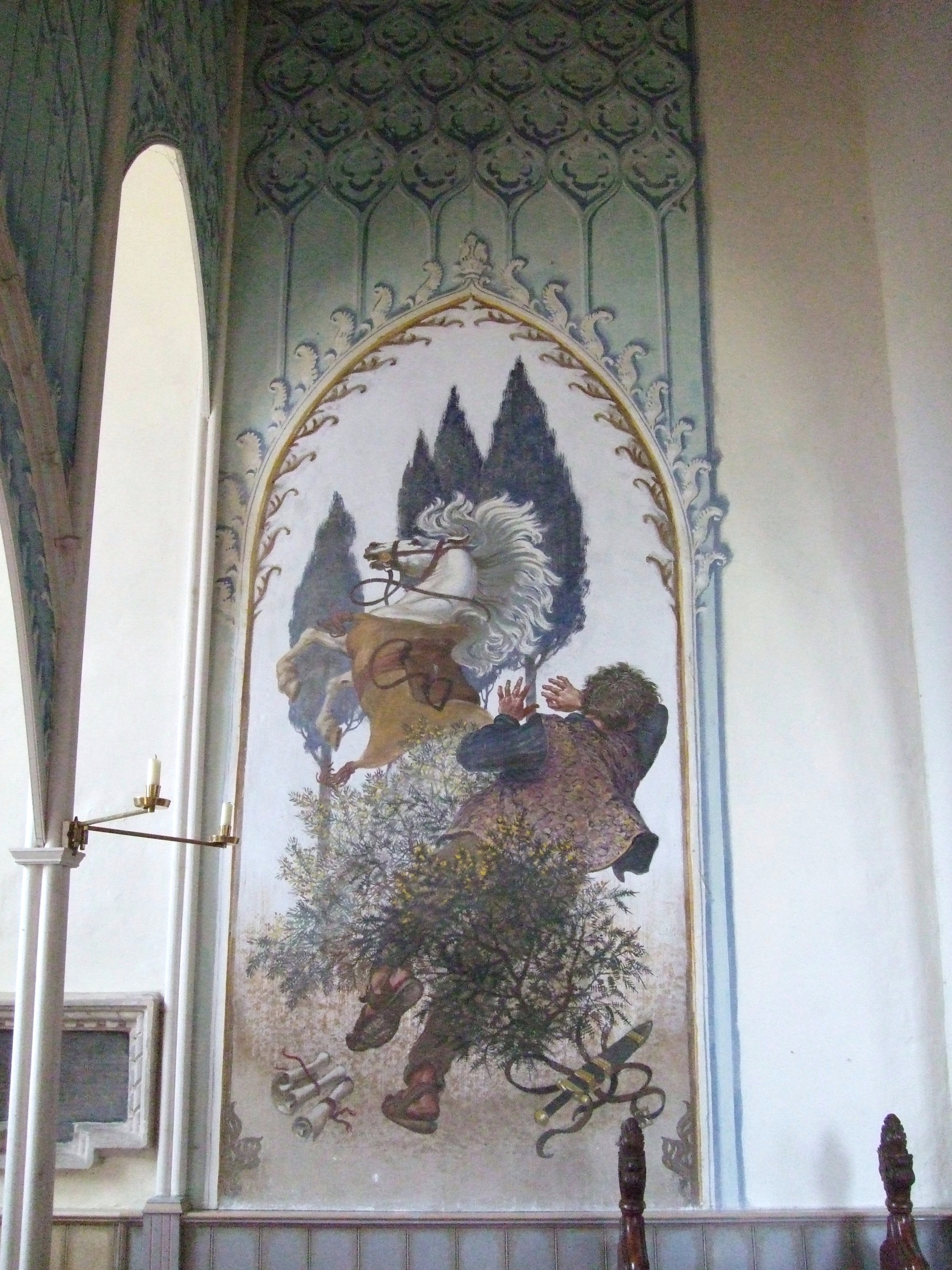
Conversion of St Paul, a mural by Henry Bird in St Margaret's Church

The Church of England parish church of St Margaret has 13th-century origins but was mostly rebuilt 1827–8.

The interior of the church is decorated with biblical murals by the Northampton artist, Henry Bird. Plans were made for the works in 1960 and they were painted from February 1975 until the summer of 1976. They are on 16 panels with 31 life-size figures, many based on local people.
