= Anglo-Saxon turriform churches =

Anglo-Saxon style of church

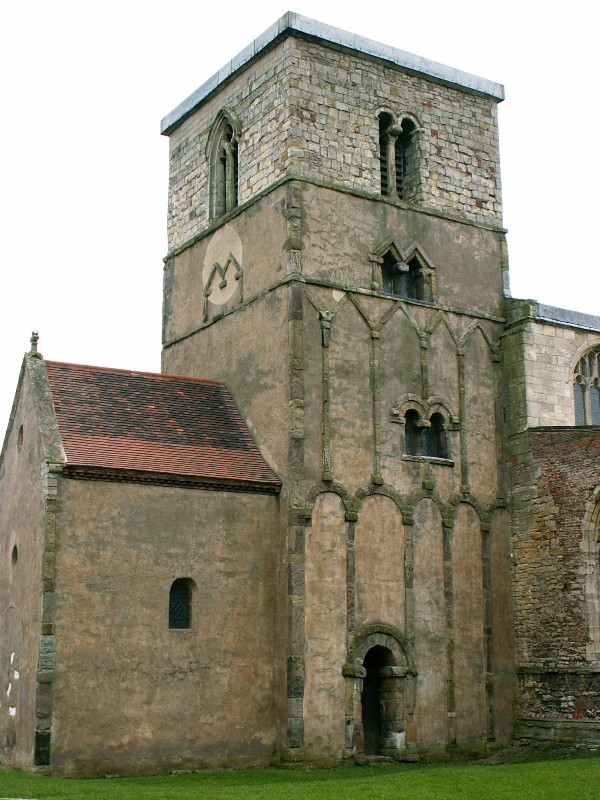
The tower and (on the left) the baptistery of St Peter's Church, Barton-upon-Humber

Anglo-Saxon turriform churches were an Anglo-Saxon style of church that were built in the form of towers. They can also be called tower-nave churches.

== Overview ==
Several Anglo-Saxon churches were built as towers. The ground floor was used as the nave; there was a small projecting chancel on the east side and sometimes also the west, as at St Peter's Church, Barton-upon-Humber (the baptistery). Archaeological investigations at St. Peter's in 1898 revealed the foundations of the original small chancel; marks on the east wall of the tower also show where its walls were, and that it was narrower than the tower. Later, in this case in the fourteenth century, the chancel was replaced with a nave extending eastward from the tower.

The interior of the tower-nave at Barton-upon-Humber

Some have suggested that the turriform churches were the earliest type of churches built in Anglo-Saxon England, particularly in small settlements where it was natural to use timber, as in non-ecclesiastical buildings. However, there are no churches left that still have only the tower. The sequence of development into the usual stone cruciform church would have been:

1. A small tower church built in timber, with a small eastern extension for the chancel and sometimes also a small "west-nave".
2. Replacement of the chancel and west-nave, if present, using stone.
3. Rebuilding of the ground floor of the tower in stone.
4. Addition of north and south wings to the tower, to make a "winged square".
5. Construction of a long nave, with the tower now at one end. Usually the extension would be to the east, producing a west tower.

However, this is only a hypothesis; we have only one surviving Anglo-Saxon timber church, Greensted Church, a small number of written descriptions, and some archaeological evidence of ground plans. The extant stone structures can also be interpreted as having been built by carpenters who were transferring their skills to masonry work.

Analysis of the towers has revealed that they had far more timberwork than had been thought. The tower of St Peter's, Barton-upon-Humber had three levels of timbering: a first-floor gallery (which cannot have been a solid floor, because the ground-floor nave would have been lighted only by the first-floor windows), a belfry floor, and a frame on which the roof rested - either a stepped roof or a small spire.

Since the three surviving churches universally recognised as having originally had tower-naves are all in the Danelaw, one suggested reason for building them as towers is defence. Blair suggests that the Earls Barton tower church, with its heavy ornamentation, was built by a lord of the manor to impress and to "[combine] ecclesiastical, residential, and defensive functions". However, with wooden floors and access from both nave and chancel, they would have been deathtraps in a Viking raid. Another possibility is that they emulated Byzantine models; Fisher points out that the domed centrally planned churches of Eastern Christianity may also be regarded as towers.

== Surviving churches that were originally towers ==
=== Generally accepted ===
- St Peter's Church, Barton-upon-Humber, Lincolnshire
- All Saints' Church, Earls Barton, Northamptonshire; there was a chancel attached, but no western annexe
- St Mary's Church, Broughton, Lincolnshire; later in the Anglo-Saxon period, a circular stair tower was attached to the nave-tower.

=== Norman continuations of the style ===
- St Bartholomew's Church, Fingest, Buckinghamshire
- Church of St Simon and St Jude, East Dean, East Sussex, generally thought to be Norman

=== Similar churches in Scotland ===
- Holy Trinity Church, Dunfermline; foundations of a 2-cell church under the nave
- Abbey of St Peter, Restenneth
- St Regulus' Chapel, St Andrews

== Gallery ==
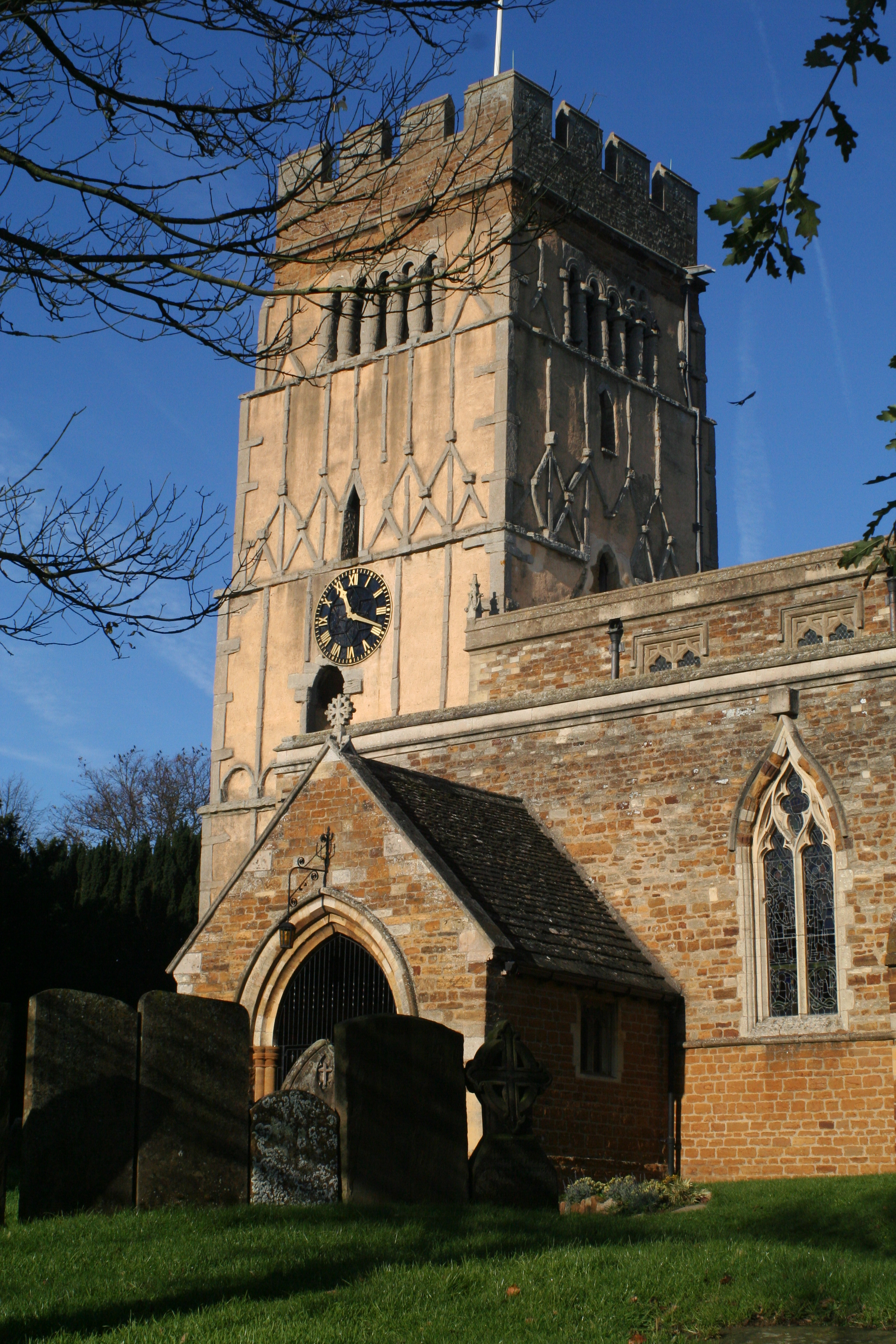
Tower of All Saints' Church, Earls Barton

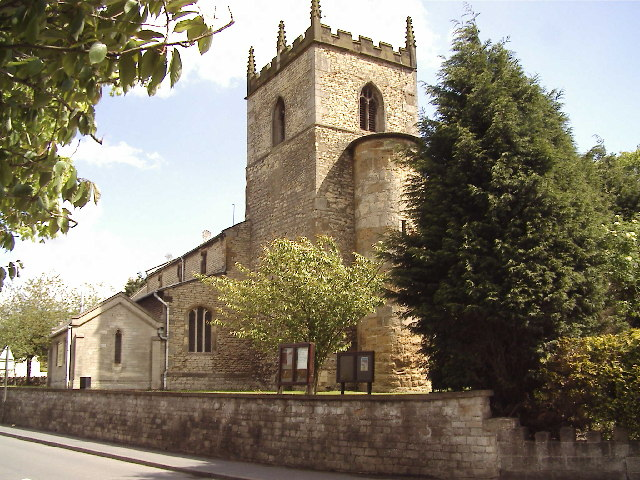
Tower of St Mary's Church, Broughton

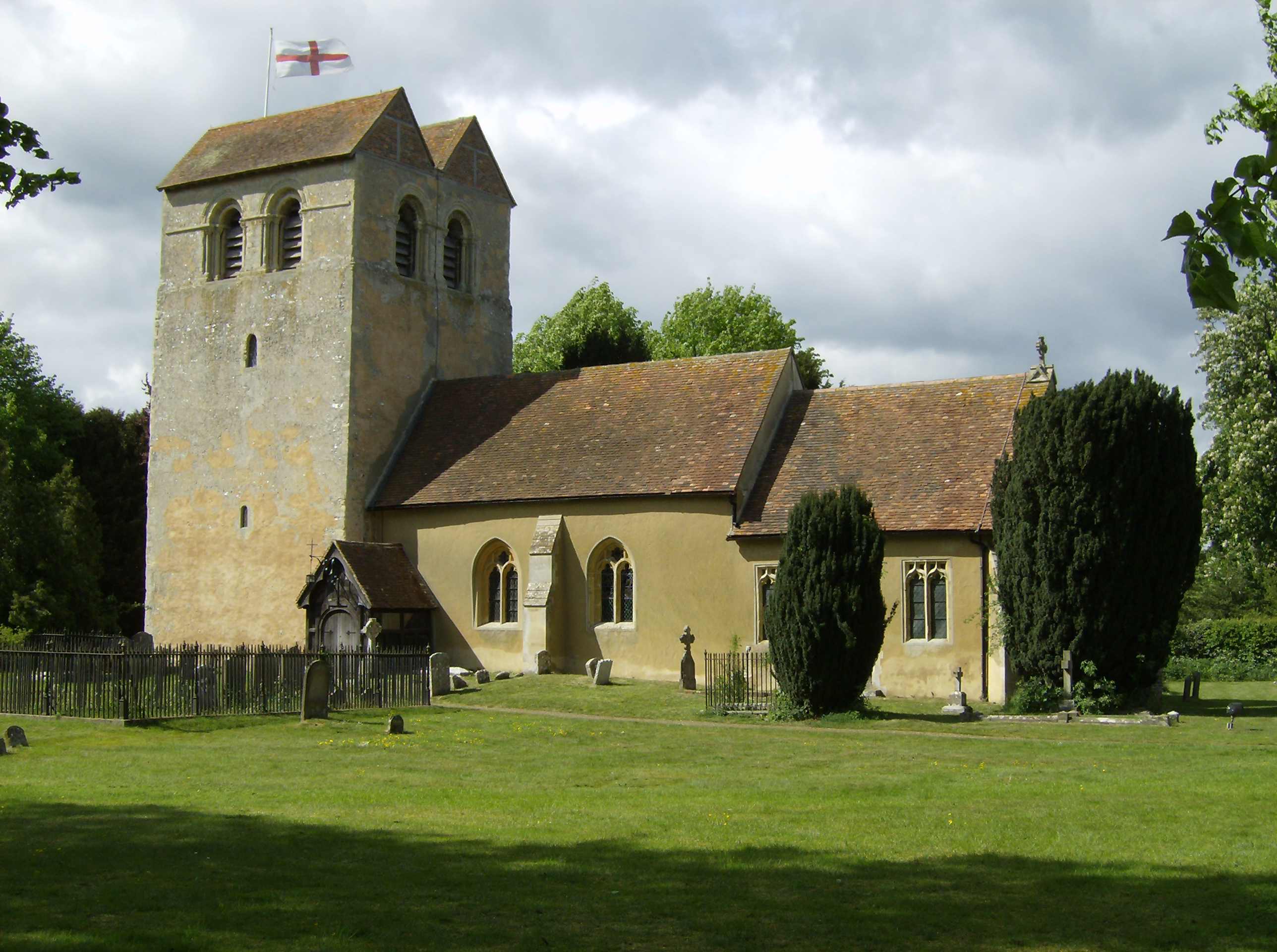
St. Bartholomew's Church, Fingest - early Norman tower
