= St Peter's Church, Northampton =

Coordinates: 52.2365°N 0.9034°W

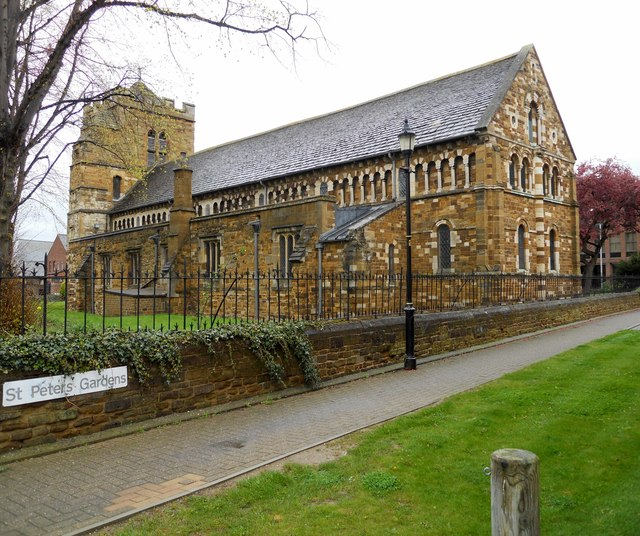
- St Peter's Church from the southeast

- Location in Northamptonshire
- OS grid reference: SP 749 603
- Location: Marefair, Northampton
- Country: England
- Denomination: Church of England
- Previous denomination: Catholic Church
- Website: Churches Conservation Trust

History
- Dedication: Saint Peter

Architecture
- Functional status: Redundant
- Heritage designation: Grade I
- Designated: 19 January 1952
- Architectural type: Church
- Style: Norman, Neo-Norman
- Groundbreaking: 1145–53
- Completed: 1850s

Specifications
- Materials: Ironstone, oolithic limestone

St Peter's Church is a 'redundant' parish church in Marefair, Northampton, England. A change of role after serving as a place of worship, this church now has a function for wider community activity. It is recorded in the National Heritage List for England as a designated Grade I listed building, and is under the care of the Churches Conservation Trust. It is considered to be "the most outstanding Norman church in the county" (Northamptonshire), and "its capital sculpture is one of the highlights of the Romanesque in England". Alec Clifton-Taylor includes the church in his list of 'best' English parish churches.

== Parish history ==
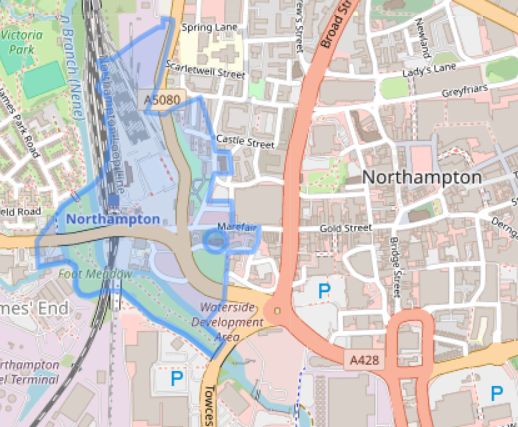
The ancient parish boundaries of Northampton St Peter's parish (the blue circle marks the location of the church)

The church stands on a site between a former Anglo-Saxon palace and Northampton Castle. Two previous churches have been on the site, one built in wood, the other in stone. The present church was probably built c. 1150 by Simon de Senlis II. The plan of the church was a simple basilica.

The west tower had fallen by 1607 and was rebuilt later in that century, moving it 12 feet (3.7 m) to the east. In the 1850s the church was restored by George Gilbert Scott. This included re-roofing the church, rebuilding the east end and lowering the floor of the nave by 1 foot (0.3 m). Scott also reconstructed the clerestory but left the Norman carvings untouched. In 1878–79 his son, John Oldrid Scott carried out a scheme of decoration using stencils on the interior of the east wall.

=== Lollards in St Peter's ===
In the 1390s Anna Palmer was living as an anchoress next to the church. She was summoned before John Buckingham, Bishop of Lincoln on several charges of heresy and one of incontinence. She was said to be a leader of Lollard heretics. She was imprisoned in Banbury after calling the Bishop an anti-Christ and only admitting that on the charge of incontinence she was innocent.

== Architecture ==
=== Exterior ===
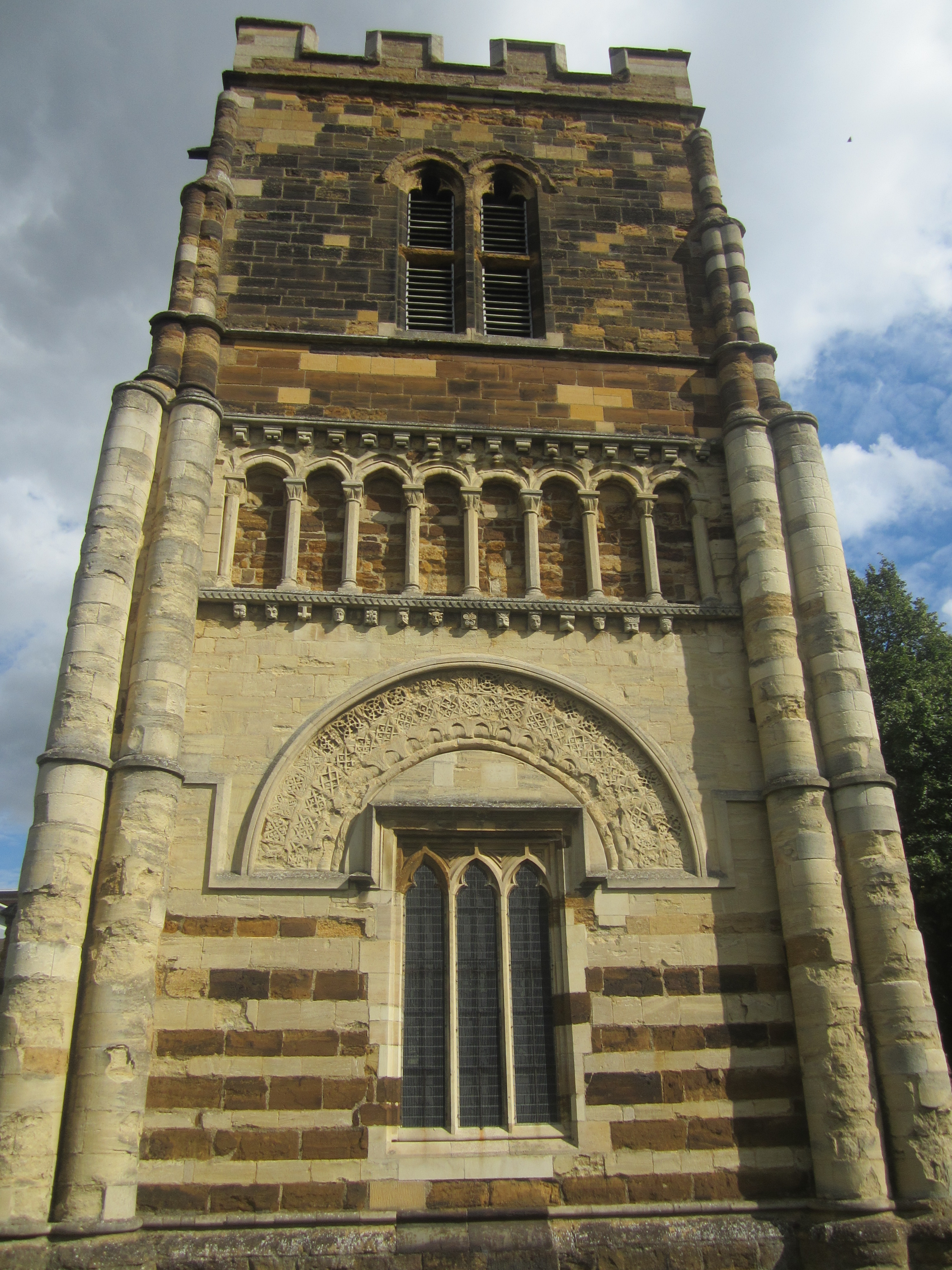
West face of the tower

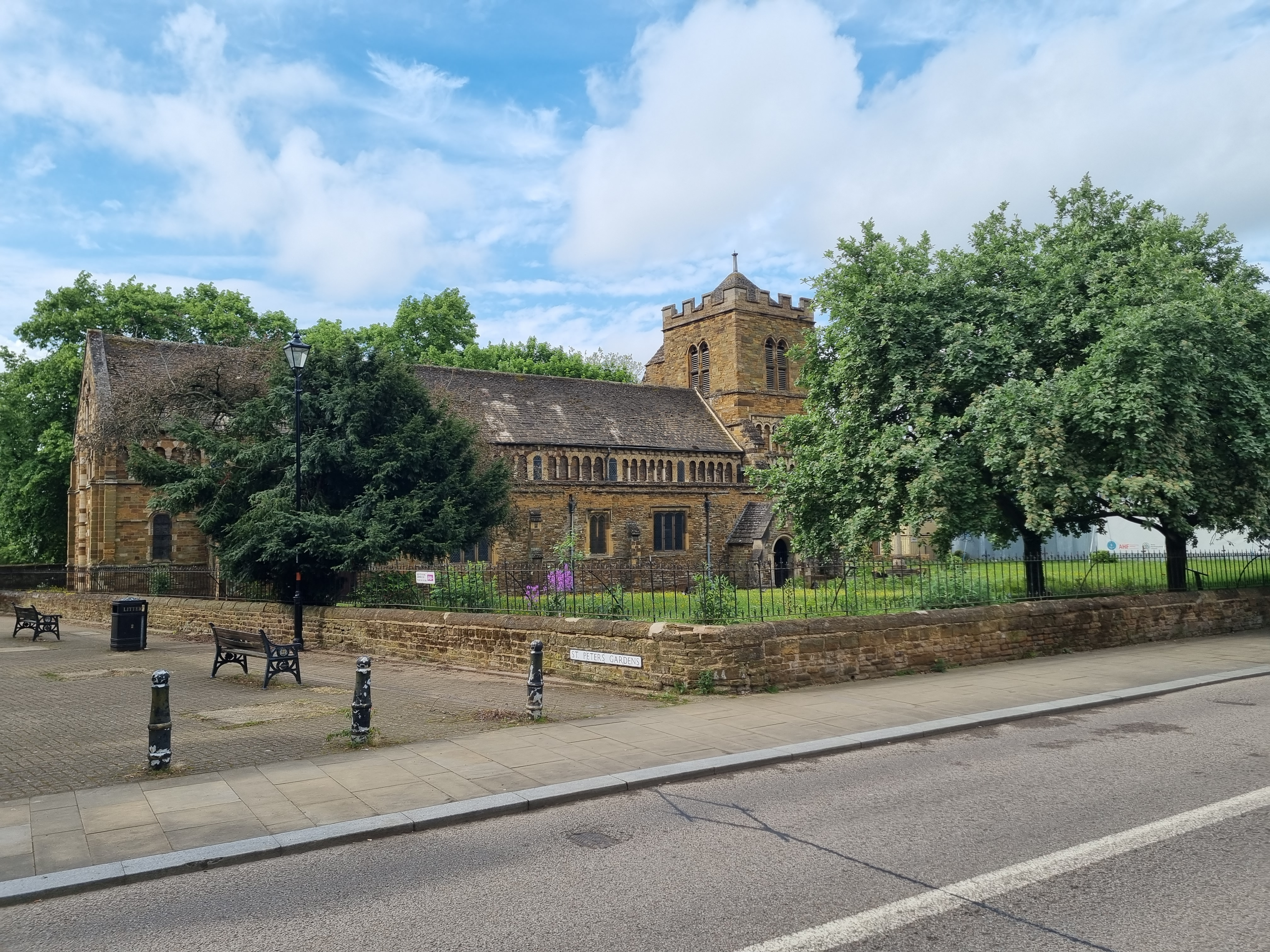
Church building in 2024

St Peter's is constructed in reddish ironstone and yellowish oolithic limestone. The two colours of stone are in some parts of the church used alternately for decorative purposes both externally and internally. The plan of the church consists of a nave and chancel with no structural division. There are north and south aisles extending along both the nave and the chancel. The aisles at the sides of the chancel are now used as vestries. Above both the nave and the chancel is a clerestory. There are doorways on both the north and south sides of the nave, the doorway on the north also having a porch. Both doorways are in Norman style with round-headed arches.

The tower is in three stages with a battlemented parapet. There are buttresses at the western corners. In the bottom stage of the west face is a three-light square-headed window, over which is the arch of the original west doorway. This is round-headed and consists of three orders of archivolts with carved voussoirs. In the middle stage are round-headed blind arcades. The west face has a single arcade of eight arches. On the north face are two tiers of arcades, each containing seven arches. The upper tier also includes a clock face. The south face also has two tiers, the upper tier having eight arches, and the lower tier with six arches. On each side of the top stage is a two-light louvered bell opening.

Along both the north and south sides of the exterior of the clerestory are Norman arcades. Above these are corbels supporting the roof. The corbels are carved with a variety of images, mainly human and animal heads. The east façade designed by Gilbert Scott has three stories divided by string courses. In the centre, rising to the top of the middle storey is a circular column. All the windows are round-headed. In the lowest storey is a single window on each side of the column. The middle storey contains a pair of windows on each side. In the top storey, which is gabled, is a single window in the centre, its arch having sawtooth decoration. On each side of this window is a small quatrefoil window, and above it is a small round-headed niche.

=== Interior ===
The aisles are separated from the nave and the chancel by a continuous arcade of eight bays, five of which are between the nave and the aisles, and the other three bays between the chancel and the aisles. The tower arch and the arches in the arcades are all in Norman style. The capitals are carved in a variety of designs, which include faces, foliage, animals and birds, and abstract motifs. The east wall contains the decorative scheme applied by Oldrid Scott. In front of the east wall is an ornate carved reredos with paintings by Burlison and Grylls. The lectern is brass. The font dates from the 14th century, and has a painted cover by Gilbert Scott. The stained glass windows date from the second half of the 19th century. In the south aisle is a splendidly well-preserved 12th-century grave slab thought to be carved by the same stone masons who did the decorative carvings on the capitals. The disgorging head breathes out a stream of creation: with foliage, dragons and a stag hunted by a dog. The imagery is in Scandinavian-Saxon style and shows continuity of tradition in the art history. The memorials in the church include one to the geologist William Smith who died in 1839. This marble bust was carved by Matthew Noble. The tomb of William Smith is in the churchyard facing the west tower. There is a ring of eight bells, all of which were cast in 1734 by Abraham II Rudhall.

== Recent history and present day ==
The church closed in 1995 and was vested in the Churches Conservation Trust in 1998. In 2002 the internal fabric of the church was being damaged by the growth of mould due to excessive condensation. It was found that this was due to the use of impervious oil-based paint. Low-level heating was installed, the mould and layers of paint were removed, and this was replaced by limewash. Oldrid Scott's decorative scheme had been overpainted. This paint was also removed, revealing the original decoration. The building is now being used as a community asset. Concerts, educational, and social events are organised in the church, and occasional services are held. An organisation known as The Friends of St Peter's was founded in 1995, which works to care for the fabric of the church, to promote research, and to encourage social use of the building.

== See also ==
- List of churches preserved by the Churches Conservation Trust in the English Midlands
- List of churches in Northampton
- All Saints' Church, Brixworth
- All Saints' Church, Earls Barton
- The Slapton Wall Paintings
