= St Peter's Church, Barton-upon-Humber =

Church in Barton-upon-Humber, England

St Peter's Church
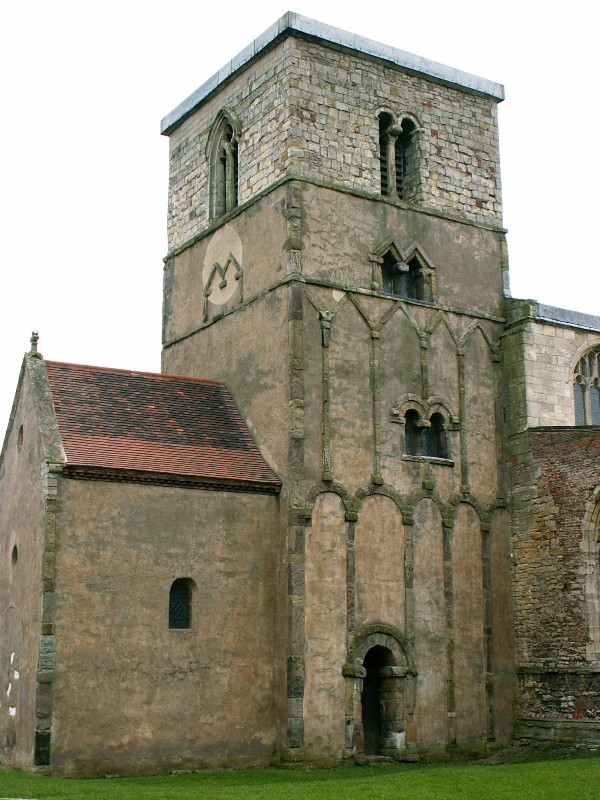
- Tower and baptistery, from the south
- St Peter's Church
- 53.68379°N 0.43471°W
- OS grid reference: TA 03478 21949
- Location: Barton-upon-Humber
- Country: England
- Denomination: Church of England

History
- Status: Church
- Founded: 9th/10th century

Architecture
- Functional status: Museum
- Heritage designation: Grade I
- Designated: 1965
- Style: Anglo-Saxon, Norman, Gothic
- Closed: 1970

St Peter's Church is the former parish church of Barton-upon-Humber in North Lincolnshire, England. It is one of the best known Anglo-Saxon buildings, in part due to its role in Thomas Rickman's identification of the style. It has been subject to major excavations. The former Church of England church is now run by English Heritage and houses an exhibition exploring its history.

== Origins ==
The church lies immediately east of the remains of a near circular enclosure which contained a hall. This is, on average, 820 feet (250 m) in diameter and was originally surrounded by a ditch and timber palisade known to date to before 900. An early pagan Saxon cemetery, believed to be linked with this enclosure and dated to the first half of the seventh century, was discovered at Castledyke, south of the church, and was used to bury high-status individuals. In 669 Saint Chad founded a monastery in neighbouring Barrow-upon-Humber. An Anglo-Saxon charter dated 971 suggests that Barton became a grange attached to this monastery.

The earliest graves on the site of the church date from the ninth century, around one hundred years after the southerly cemetery was abandoned. At this stage, it appears to have been reserved for burials associated with the hall and there may have been an associated chapel, although no trace of this remains. This was Barton's first Christian cemetery.

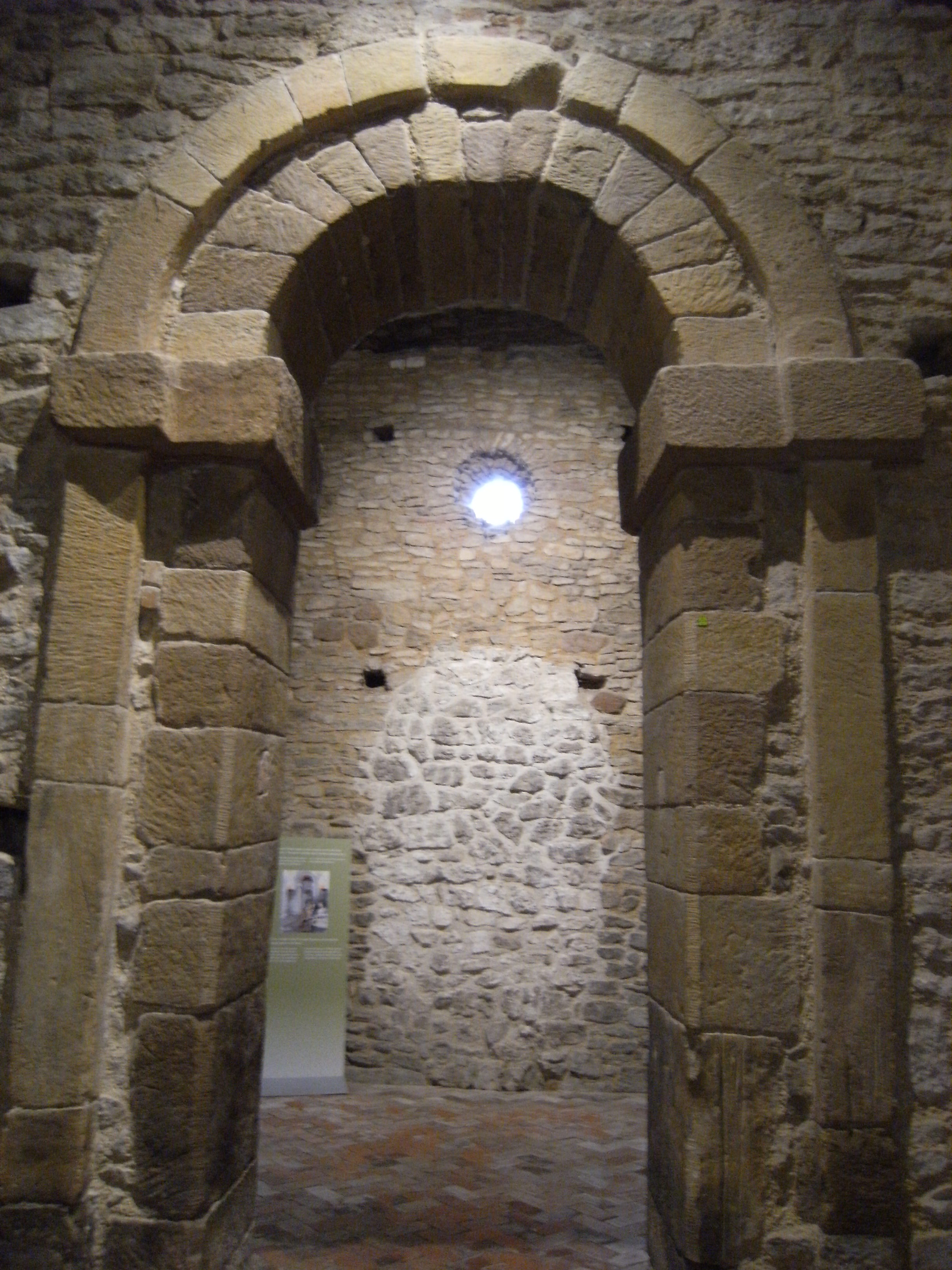
View from the tower to the baptistery

The dating of the church is somewhat controversial. English Heritage date the baptistery to the ninth century and the tower nave to the tenth century. Some other sources give a slightly later date, between 970 and 1030. In particular, it is uncertain whether the baptistery does predate the tower or if the two are contemporary. Around the date of construction the ditch to the east was infilled, allowing level access between the hall and the church. Unusually, graves disturbed by the laying of foundations were carefully relocated.

== Architecture ==
The church was originally turriform: the ground floor of the tower served as the nave.

The tower shows typical features of Saxon architecture: walls of rendered rubble, with decorative pilaster strip work, and long and short work. The pilasters do not provide any possible support – some are only very shallowly set into the wall. They are cut from Roman ashlars. Oak beams survive at two levels in the tower; these would originally have supported higher floors. The first floor must have been a gallery, as there are no windows at ground floor level. The tower has only a few, small, windows, with either round or triangular windowheads, and they are divided by a shaft. There are north and south doorways, which appear to have originally possessed timber porches. The roof would have been of timber construction, probably of stepped pyramidal form, and covered with shingles.

The tower is linked to the baptistery by a narrow doorway, which originally had a timber doorcase. Excavations have revealed a font base buried in the floor of the room. Externally, it is plainer than the tower, with even fewer, simple windows. On the opposite side of the tower to the baptistery, a chancel was constructed. Foundations of a permanent altar and a screen have been found under this space. Both baptistery and chancel would have had flat ceilings with attics above.

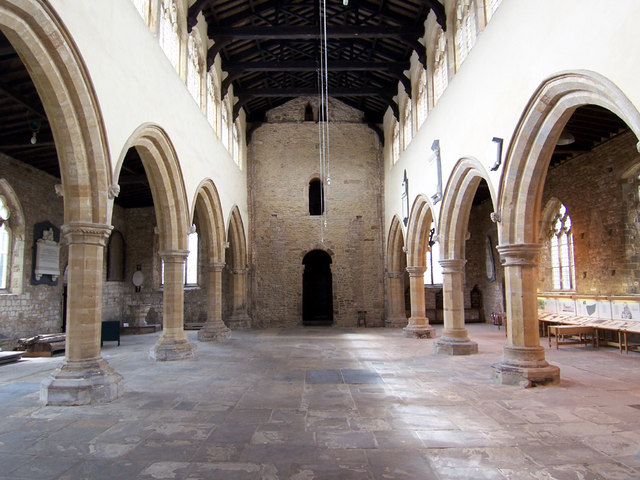
The medieval nave

Barton thrived as a town, and was recorded in the Domesday Book of 1086 as housing two mills and a ferry, worth £4 per year. In the early Norman period, perhaps the late eleventh century, a third storey was added to the tower of St Peter's, using dressed limestone in a Romanesque style.

The chancel of St Peter's was demolished c.1100 to make way for a larger early Norman building east of the existing tower, the foundations of which were found under the present nave during the 1970s excavation. This was gradually expanded in the 12th and 13th century before being largely replaced in the fourteenth century by the present nave and chancel. The earliest parts of this extension are in the Decorated Gothic style, with some of the arcade capitals reused from the earlier building. One of these depicts a Green Man. The window at the east end of the north aisle, now inside the church because of the later addition to the east, contains a rare example of figural carving on the tracery. It is of the mid-14th century, with four lights and flowing tracery, and carved against the central mullion is a rood flanked by the Virgin and St John on the other two mullions: a complete rood group. The clerestory dates from around 1430. The chancel was rebuilt in the second half of the 15th century, and the east window retains fragments of early 14th-century stained glass depicting Saint George and Saint James. Other historic monuments include the fifteenth-century chancel effigy and rood screen, and wall monuments from the late sixteenth century.

In about 1310 a cross was constructed in the churchyard. This is Grade II listed in its own right, as is part of the churchyard wall.

== Early investigations ==
Thomas Rickman, a keen architectural historian and author of An Attempt to Discriminate the Styles of English Architecture, investigated the church in 1819. His inspection led him to describe the principle of "structural stratification" – where one phase of building rests on another, the second must be of an earlier date. This enabled him, for the first time, to persuasively argue that the standing structure must be of Anglo-Saxon date, as the Norman top storey of the tower was supported by two stories constructed in a very different, then unknown, style. Previously, while some work had been labelled as Saxon, this was all Romanesque, and only guesswork attempted to distinguish this from Norman architecture. Rickman presented his influential hypothesis that St Peter's and the Church of St Thomas of Canterbury, Clapham, Bedfordshire possessed Saxon towers in an updated edition of An Attempt to Discriminate....

== Excavation and restoration ==
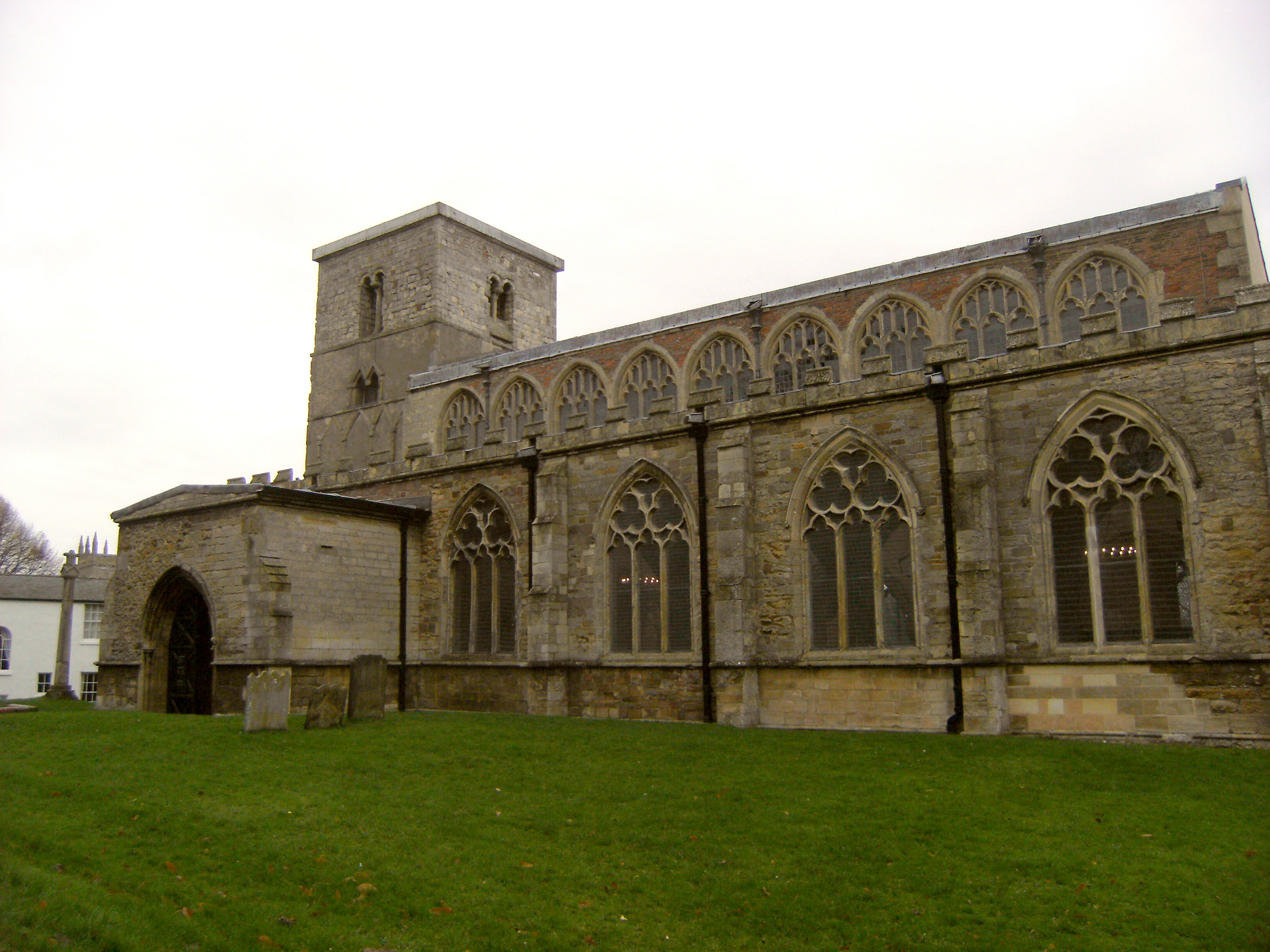
View from the south east, showing the nave, south aisle, porch and tower

The church has been Grade A listed in 1965, a status since converted to Grade I. It was closed in 1970, its former chapel-of-ease, St Mary's, becoming the parish church. Ownership was taken over by the Department of the Environment.

Harold McCarter Taylor identified the church as an ideal location for an archaeological excavation, given that it was, uniquely, a substantial Saxon church which was no longer used for worship. He noted that, as the building had been examined repeatedly by architectural historians, there was little possibility of resolving the considerable questions about its construction and history without excavations. In 1977, he secured funding from the Department of the Environment, and began the most extensive archaeological investigation ever undertaken of a British parish church, not completed until 1985. Alongside the excavation, extensive repairs to the building were undertaken. 3,000 skeletons were removed from the site, providing what has been described as "an osteological record unparalleled for any small town in England". Due to waterlogged conditions, in some cases, wooden coffins had also survived. Some of these were dug-out logs, while some are believed to be constructed from old boats. At least ten burials were accompanied by hazel rods, and one had a pillow of organic material.

In 2007, the skeletons were placed in an on-site ossuary, so as to leave them in consecrated ground close to their original location, while still permitting future study. Three skeletons remained on display in the church, alongside a selection of grave goods and two coffins. The church was opened by English Heritage as a visitor attraction in May 2007. In 2026, the so-called 'Conquest Man' (a 50-60 year old man) was placed on public display; his DNA suggests that he had ancestry from across Europe but he was also buried in a Scandinavian burial tradition. A reconstruction of his face was produced in 2026.

== Bells ==
In 1859, following the internal renovation by Cuthbert Brodrick, the Hull Packet described the bells thus:

There are eight bells in the tower, the first or treble bell being 2 feet 4 inches in diameter, with a latin inscription. The second, 2 feet 5 inches in diameter with this inscription, "Daniel Hedersley, founder 1741." The third, 2 feet 7 1/2 inches in diameter, with this inscription, "George Adamson, William Bygott, C.W., 1741." The fourth, 2 feet 8 inches in diameter, with this inscription, "Sweetly tolling, men do call to taste, on meats that feed the soul." The fifth, 2 feet 10 1/2 inches in diameter, with this inscription, "John Fairwether, Richard Green, churchwardens, 1666." The sixth or tenor bell, 3 feet 4 inches in diameter, with this inscription, "Henry Nelthorpe and William Gilders, churchwardens, 1743." (Hull Packet, 3 June 1859)

Dove's guide for church bell ringers states that there are now eight bells, of which the tenor weighs 522 kilograms.
