= Elizabeth Christophers Hobson =

- Born: Elizabeth Christophers Kimball; November 22, 1831; Long Island, New York
- Died: June 11, 1912 (aged 80); Bar Harbor, Maine, U.S.
- Other names: E. C. Hobson; Elizabeth C. Hobson
- Occupation: Social worker
- Known for: Co-founder of the Bellevue Training School for Nurses
- Spouse: Joseph Hobson (m. 1850)

Elizabeth Christophers Hobson (née Kimball; November 22, 1831 – June 11, 1912) was an American social worker who co-founded the Bellevue Training School for Nurses, setting the trend for nursing training practices according to the Nightingale plan. She was particularly interested in funding programs to improve the lives of working women. She formalized first aid training, which involved traveling to Europe and the Middle East. She made the case for establishing the Southern Industrial Classes for African American women. In her later years, she wrote the book Recollections of a Happy Life.

== Early life ==
Elizabeth Christophers Kimball was born on November 22, 1831, in Long Island, New York, to Sarah (née Wetmore) and Elijah Huntington Kimball, a farmer and lawyer. She had four younger sisters: Mary, Lucy, Caroline, and Fanny. Her brothers-in-law included Hiram Berdan, an officer for the Union Army and an inventor and Vice President Levi P. Morton. Her parents descended from colonists Richard Kimball and Ichabod Wetmore. Her father raised his daughters to be racially tolerant, active in their communities, and intelligent women. Her mother sought for her daughters to marry as soon as prudent.

Elizabeth attended a private seminary for girls operated by Henry Philip Tappan. The Kimballs had a farm in New Hampshire, where they spent the summers. The winters were spent at the luxury hotel, Astor House, in New York City.

== Marriage ==
Elizabeth Kimball traveled to California by ship and intended to travel to India. She met Joseph Hobson in San Francisco, California, and within ten days, they were engaged. Married to Hobson on December 4, 1850, in Flatlands, Brooklyn, she became Elizabeth Hobson. The couple lived the first six months of their marriage in San Francisco. Joseph Hobson died in 1881, after which Hobson traveled to France, Russia, and Germany.

== South American hostess ==
The couple lived for four years in Valparaíso, Chile, where Joseph, a banker, managed his company's interests there. Hobson was an "accomplished hostess". They returned to the United States, and after several years they lived in Lima, Peru until the 1868 Arica earthquake (centered around Arica, Peru (Arica is now part of Chile). They then returned to the United States.

== Social welfare and nursing education ==
Hobson became interested in social welfare and proper nursing education through Louisa Lee Schuyler. She supported Schuyler's founding of the Bellevue School of Nursing in 1872. Hobson sought to improve the conditions at Bellevue Hospital in New York by instituting training for standard practices for nurses, including maintaining sanitary conditions, guided by Florence Nightingale's documents (like Notes on Nursing (1859)).

Hobson wrote a report about the need for proper training, standard practices, and professionalism of nurses for the State Charities Aid Association. Their support led to the founding of the Bellevue School of Nursing and her leadership for the plan of operation. Hobson sat on the initial board of directors. She oversaw the first nine months of its operations. The school was located in Manhattan at 426 Twenty-Sixth Street. Hobson was the vice president of the school in 1881. The Nightingale plan and Bellevue's operations became a standard for public hospitals in the United States.

She chaired the First Aid department of the State Charities Aid Association in 1882 and traveled to Paris, Italy, Palestine, and Constantinople until 1895.

After studying the plight of African American women in five states, she recommended the establishment by the John F. Slater Fund of the Southern Industrial Classes in Norfolk, Virginia that taught cooking, sewing, and first aid. She was president of the school until 1912.

== Later years and death ==
Hobson lived in Washington, D.C. and Bar Harbor, Maine and wrote the book Recollections of a Happy Life. On her 75th birthday, she was described by Thomas Nelson Page as having "looks like a woman of 30, has the voice of a woman of 30 and the heart of a girl of 16." She was good friends of President Theodore and Edith Roosevelt, and her home was "one of the few private houses where they meet in an informal way".

She died at her home in Bar Harbor on June 11, 1912. A service was held for her at Grace Church in Manhattan, New York City and was buried in a family plot at Green-Wood Cemetery in Brooklyn.

== Bibliography ==
- James, Edward T.; James, Janet Wilson; Boyer, Paul S.; Radcliffe College (1971). Notable American women, 1607-1950; a biographical dictionary. Cambridge, Mass., Belknap Press of Harvard University Press. ISBN 978-0-674-62734-5.
