= Hunter-Bellevue School of Nursing =

Nursing school in New York City, New York, U.S.

- Former names: The Training School for Nurses; Bellevue Schools of Nursing; Bellevue and Mills Schools of Nursing; Hunter College Department of Nursing
- Type: Public
- Established: May 1, 1873
- Parent institution: Hunter College
- Accreditation: Commission on Collegiate Nursing Education (CCNE)
- Dean: Ann Marie P. Mauro, PhD, RN, ANEF, FAHA, FNAP, FAAN
- Faculty: 124
- Students: 963
- Location: 60 West Street, New York, New York, 10006, US; 40.7086°N 74.0147°W
- Website: www.hunter.cuny.edu/nursing

The Hunter-Bellevue School of Nursing (HBSON) is the nursing school of Hunter College, a senior college of the City University of New York (CUNY). It is located at the former Metropolitan College of New York, at 60 West Street, in the Financial District of Manhattan. The school is the flagship nursing program for CUNY.

== History ==
=== The Training School for Nurses ===
The nation's first nursing school based on Florence Nightingale's principles, the Training School for Nurses, opened at Bellevue in 1873. Sister Helen Bowdin of the All Saints Sisterhood in London was the first Superintendent.

This school was planned by the "Bellevue Hospital Visiting Committee" of the New York State Charities Aid Association in the spring of 1872. Several months were occupied in securing the cooperation of the Medical Board of Bellevue Hospital, and of the Commissioners of Charities and Correction, and in arranging preliminary details, so that the school was not opened until May 1, 1873. On February 5, 1874, a "Training-School Society" was incorporated.

There was a corps of five instructors, who give at least 24 lectures during the year, besides the instruction of the superintendent and her assistant. The school opened with a subscription fund of nearly US$25,000, which was almost entirely raised within six weeks. There were six nurses at the start, who were allowed the privileges of three wards in the hospital. They were lodged in a small rented building, near the hospital grounds. During the second year, 118 women applied for admission, and 29 were accepted as "probationers". This necessitated the rental of a second lodging-house adjoining the first. In February, 1875, three male surgical and three obstetric wards were added to the service; and thereafter, the number of wards allotted to the school gradually increased.

The full course embraced two years of study. During their second year, nurses were sent out to do private nursing. In 1875, 12 private cases were thus supplied. Towards the close of its fourth year, the school had grown to such an extent that more ample accommodations were required for the nurses; and one of the founders of the school presented a new dormitory to the school.

The age limits were between 25 and 35 years. Applicants were received at any season. A gold badge was given with the diploma to those who satisfactorily passed examinations.

=== Subsequent changes ===
In 1952, the administration of the Bellevue Schools of Nursing and the Bellevue Hospital Nursing Service was split for the first time with associate directors. In 1954, the school moved to the new building that is Hunter-Bellevue's current location and enrolled in the National Student Nurses' Association.

In 1967, an agreement with Hunter College was reached to transfer the Bellevue facilities to Hunter. In 1969, the final students in the diploma program were graduated.

Hunter began educating nurses in 1943 and admitted the first enrollees in the Basic Collegiate Nursing Program leading to a Bachelor of Science (Nursing) degree in 1955 and to the graduate program leading to a Master of Science (Nursing) in 1961.

The Hunter College Department of Nursing then expanded and moved to the facilities of the Bellevue Hospital School of Nursing in 1969 as the latter program was absorbed by Hunter Department of Nursing. From June 1974 until it became independent again in 2008, Hunter-Bellevue Nursing School was part of the Division of the Schools of the Health Professions of Hunter College.

In September 2012, plans were announced for a new campus for HBSON at 525 East 73rd Street in Manhattan near the main Hunter campus. In January 2026, the school temporarily relocated to 60 West Street in the Financial District to enable the redevelopment of the Brookdale campus into a science park and research campus.

== Academics ==
=== Undergraduate Programs ===
Bachelor of Science in Nursing

- Generic BS
- RN-to-BS
- Accelerated Second-Degree BS

=== Graduate Programs ===
The Master of Science in Nursing degree is offered in the following specialty areas:

- Adult-Gerontology Clinical Nurse Specialist
- Adult-Gerontology Primary Care Nurse Practitioner
- Community/Public Health Nursing
- Nursing Administration/Urban Policy & Leadership (Dual-MS degree)
- Nursing Education (Online)
- Psychiatric-Mental Health Nurse Practitioner

=== Post-Graduate Certificates ===
- Psychiatric-Mental Health Nurse Practitioner APRN Certificate
- Nursing Education Advanced Certificate (Online)

=== Doctoral Programs ===
The Doctor of Nursing Practice (DNP) degree is offered in the following specialty areas:

- Adult-Gerontology Primary Care Nurse Practitioner
- Psychiatric-Mental Health Nurse Practitioner
- Family Nurse Practitioner, open only to post-Master's applicants
- Nurse Anesthesia/Adult-Gerontology Acute Care Nurse Practitioner (Dual-specialty) DNP

The school began offering a post-master's research doctorate (PhD) in nursing (health equity focus), which had previously been offered jointly with the CUNY Graduate Center, in summer 2022.

== Accreditation ==
The Hunter-Bellevue School of Nursing baccalaureate, master's, post-graduate APRN certificate, and Doctor of Nursing Practice (DNP) programs are accredited by the Commission on Collegiate Nursing Education (CCNE). The Nurse Anesthesia/Adult-Gerontology Acute Care Nurse Practitioner DNP program is accredited by the Council on Accreditation of Nurse Anesthesia Educational Programs.

== Organizations ==
The Alpha Phi chapter at Hunter-Bellevue is the 43rd chapter of the Sigma Theta Tau International honor society of nursing, chartered in 1970.

The Hunter-Bellevue Student Nurses' Association (HBSNA) is a chapter of the Nursing Students’ Association of New York, which is a member of the National Student Nurses' Association.

== Rankings ==
As of 2026, the school is ranked #41 in Best Nursing Schools: Master's, #94 in Best Nursing Schools: Doctor of Nursing Practice, and #60 in Nursing-Anesthesia by U.S. News & World Report. Other publications consistently rank Hunter's nursing programs as among the best in New York State.

In 2025, the first-time pass rate for Hunter-Bellevue baccalaureate graduates taking the NCLEX-RN licensing exam was 87.6% (127 of 145).

== See also ==
- Elizabeth Christophers Hobson, co-founder of the Bellevue Training School for Nurses
- Louisa Lee Schuyler, co-founder of the Bellevue Training School for Nurses
