= Josephine Butler bibliography =

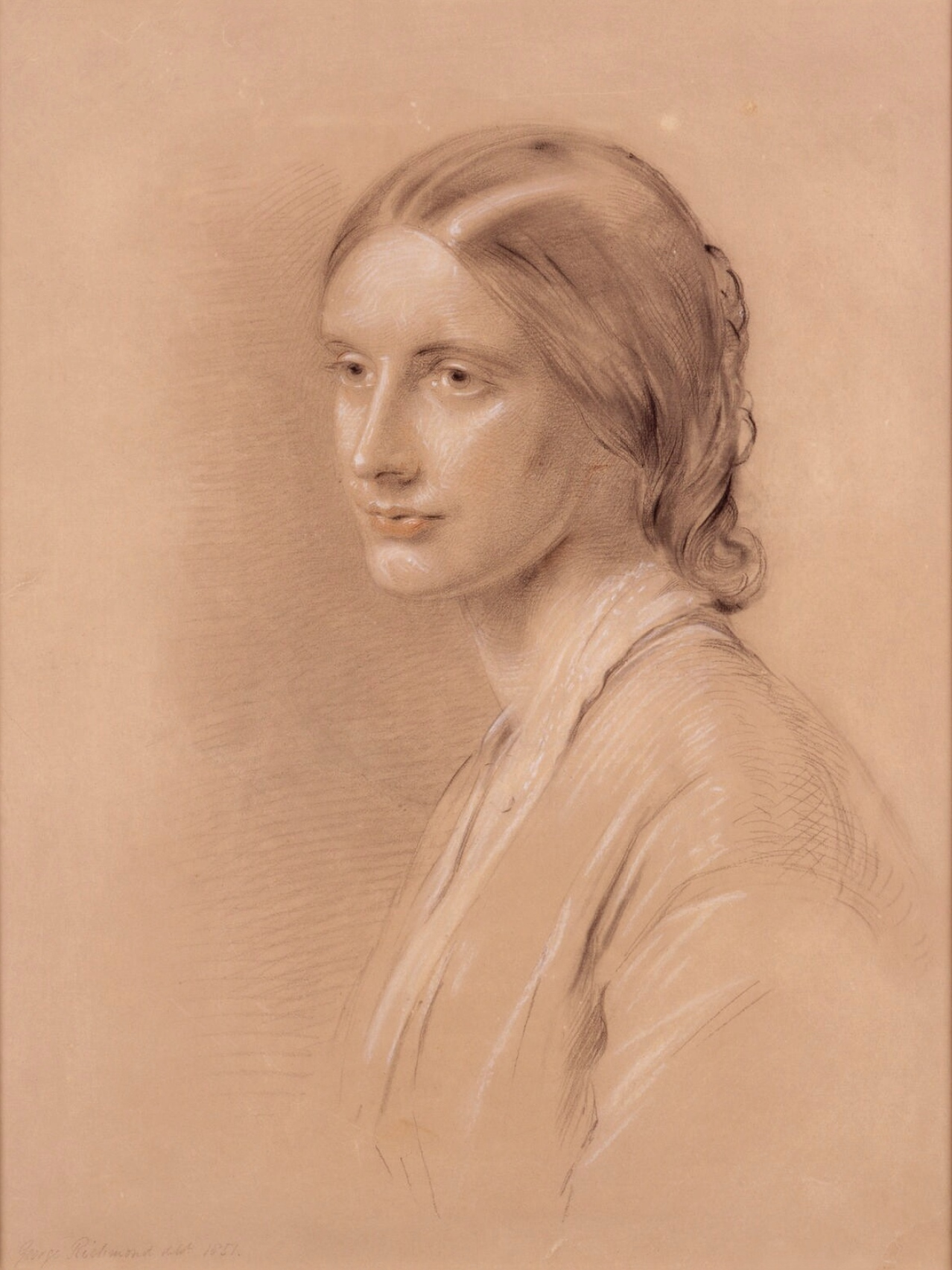
Butler in 1851, portrait by George Richmond

Josephine Butler (1828–1906) was an English feminist and social reformer in the Victorian era. She was especially concerned with the welfare of prostitutes although she campaigned on a broad range of women's rights. In 1864 her daughter Eva fell 40 feet (12 m) from the top-floor bannister onto the stone floor of the hallway in her home; she died three hours later. The death led Butler to begin a career of campaigning that ran until the end of her life; she later wrote that after the death she "became possessed with an irresistible urge to go forth and find some pain keener than my own, to meet with people more unhappy than myself. ... It was not difficult to find misery in Liverpool." Her targets included obtaining the vote, the right to better education and the end of coverture in British law, although she achieved her greatest success in leading the movement to repeal the Contagious Diseases Acts, legislation that attempted to control the spread of venereal diseases, particularly in the British Army and Royal Navy. She was also opposed to the forced medical examination of prostitutes—a process she described as "surgical" or "steel rape". Her campaigning led to the suspension of the practice in April 1883, and the Acts were formally repealed in three years later.

Butler's first full-length publication was Memoir of John Grey of Dilston, detailing the life of her father, John Grey, which she wrote following his death. She also wrote a monograph of her husband George in 1892 after his death two years previously. In 1878 Butler published a third biography, this time of Catharine of Siena, which Glen Petrie—Butler's biographer—wrote was probably her best work. Another historian, Judith Walkowitz, considers the work as providing Butler with a "historical justification for her own political activism". Over a period of at least 40 years Butler wrote over 90 books and pamphlets, mostly in support of her campaigning work; because of her campaigning on mainland Europe, some of Butler's works—based on her speeches—were written in French and German, and were published in France, Germany and Switzerland.

== Books ==
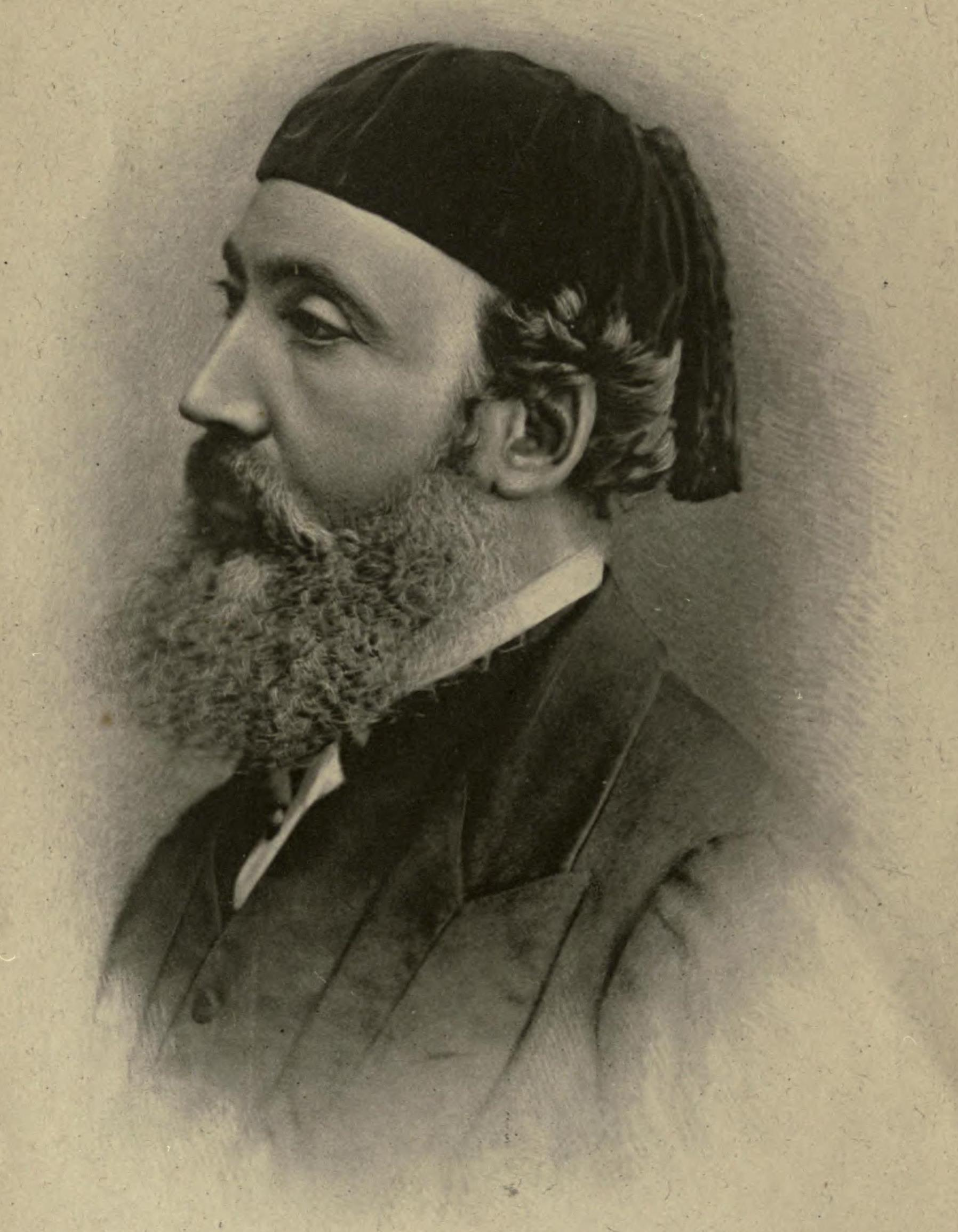
Butler wrote a biography of her husband George (pictured) after his death.

| Title | Year of first publication | First edition publisher |
|---|---|---|
| Memoir of John Grey of Dilston | 1869 | Edinburgh: Edmonston and Douglas |
| The Constitution Violated | 1871 | Edinburgh: Edmonston and Douglas |
| Une voix dans le desert | 1875 | Paris: Sandoz et Fischbacher |
| The Hour Before the Dawn | 1876 | London: Trubner and Co |
| Catharine of Siena | 1878 | London: Dyer Bros |
| Social Purity | 1879 | London: Morgan & Scott |
| The Salvation Army in Switzerland | 1883 | London: Dyer Bros |
| Life of J F Oberlin | 1883 | London: Religious Tract Society |
| The Bright Side of the Question | 1883 | Bristol: J. W. Arrowsmith |
| Rebecca Jarrett | 1885 | London: Morgan & Scott |
| Recollections of George Butler | 1892 | Bristol: J. W. Arrowsmith |
| Personal Reminiscences of a Great Crusade | 1896 | London: Horace Marshall |
| Truth Before Everything | 1898 | London: Dyer Bros |
| Prophets and Prophetesses | 1898 | London: Dyer Bros |
| Native Races and the War | 1900 | London: Gay & Bird |
| In Memoriam, Harriet Meuricoffre | 1901 | London: Horace Marshall |

== Miscellany ==
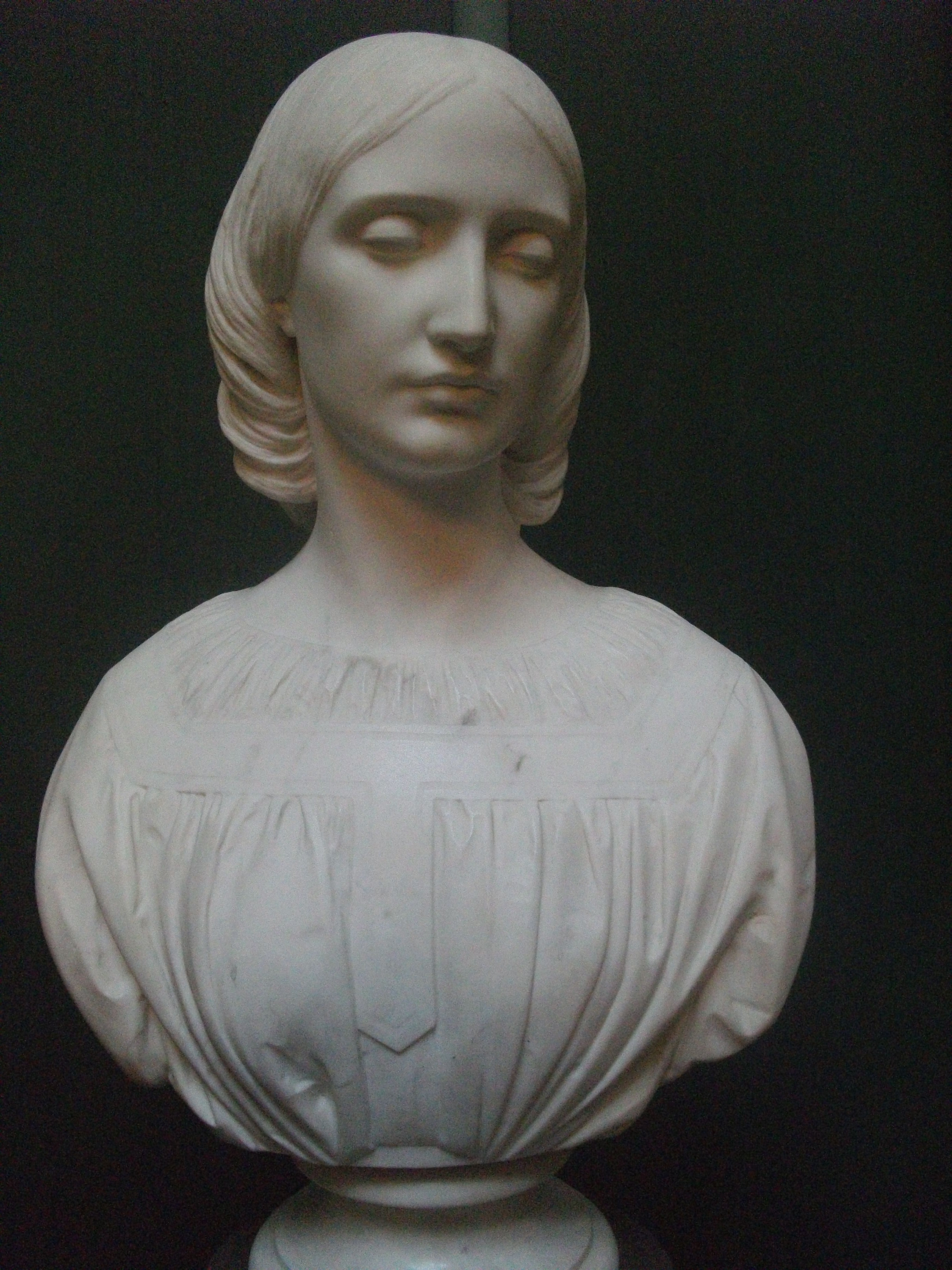
Bust of Butler in 1865 by Alexander Munro

| Title | Year of first publication | First edition publisher | Notes |
|---|---|---|---|
| Women's Work and Women's Culture | 1869 | London: Macmillan | Introduction only |
| "The Paris of Regulated Vice" | 1877 | London: Methodist Protest | Newspaper article |
| The Dawn | 1888 | London: Burfoot | Quarterly publication; Butler wrote for The Dawn between 1888 and 1896 |
| "Woman's Place in Church Work" | 1892 | London: Review of the Churches | Newspaper article |
| "Letter to Conference in London" | 1897 | London: The Shield | Newspaper article |
| The Storm-Bell | 1898 | London: Burfoot | Monthly publication; Butler wrote for The Storm-Bell between 1898 and 1900 |
| "Receiving" | 1900 | London: Wings | Newspaper article |
| "Reflexíons sur la Federation" | 1902 | Revue du Christianisme Social | Newspaper article |

== Pamphlets ==
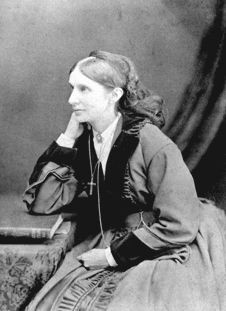
Butler in 1876

| Title | Year of first publication | First edition publisher |
|---|---|---|
| "The Education and Employment of Women" | 1868 | London: Macmillan |
| "An Appeal to the People of England on the Recognition and Superintendence of Prostitution by Governments" (Note: Published under the pseudonym "by an English Mother") | 1870 | Nottingham: Banks |
| "On the Moral Reclaimability of Prostitutes" | 1870 | London: The National Association for the Repeal of the Contagious Diseases Acts |
| "The Duty of Women in Relation to Our Great Social Evil, and Recent Legislation Thereupon" | 1870 | Carlisle: Hudson Scott |
| "Sursum Corda: Annual Address to the Ladies' National Association" | 1871 | Liverpool: Brakell |
| "The Constitutional Iniquity of the Contagious Diseases Acts of 1866 and 69" | 1871 | London: The National Association for the Repeal of the Contagious Diseases Acts |
| "Address Delivered in Craigie Hall" | 1871 | Manchester: A Ireland & Co |
| "Address Delivered at Croydon" | 1871 | London: The National Association for the Repeal of the Contagious Diseases Acts |
| "Vox Populi" | 1871 | Liverpool: Brakell |
| "Letter to my Countrywomen, Dwelling in the Farmsteads and Cottages of England" | 1871 | Manchester: A Ireland & Co |
| "Letter to the Order of Good Templars" | 1871 | Liverpool: Brakell |
| "The New Era: Containing a Retrospect of the History of the Regulation System in Berlin" | 1872 | Liverpool: Brakell |
| "On the Subject of Mr. Bruce's Bill" | 1872 | Liverpool: Brakell |
| "A Few Words Addressed to True-Hearted Women" | 1872 | Liverpool: Brakell |
| "Letter to a Friend on a Recent Division in the House of Commons" | 1873 | Liverpool: Brakell |
| "Legislative Restrictions on the Industry of Women, Considered From the Women's Point of View" | 1873 | London: Personal Rights Association |
| "Some Thoughts on the Present Aspect of the Crusade Against the State Regulation of Vice" | 1874 | Liverpool: Brakell |
| "Speech at Bristol to the Vigilance Association" | 1874 | London: F Bell & Co |
| "A Letter to the Members of the Ladies' National Association" | 1875 | Liverpool: Brakell |
| "State Regulation of Vice" | 1876 | Hull |
| "The New Abolitionists" | 1876 | London: Dyer Bros |
| "Adieux a Genève" | 1877 | Geneva |
| "Discours prononcé a l'hôtel Wagram" | 1877 | Paris |
| "Discours prononcé dans la Salle de la rue d' Arras" | 1877 | Paris |
| "Discours prononcé dans la Chapelle Malesherbes" | 1877 | Paris |
| "Discours prononcé dans la Salle de la Redonte" | 1877 | Paris |
| "Ceux qui prient" | 1878 | Paris |
| "Government by Police" | 1879 | London: Dyer Bros |
| "Souvenir des réunions à Vevey" | 1879 | Fontaines |
| "Depositions Regarding Treatment of English Girls in Immoral Houses in Brussels" | 1880 | Private (Note: Printed for private circulation only) |
| "Extrait d'une lettre a I'occasion des investigations de M.X. & Bruxelles" | 1880 | Neuchâtel |
| "Discours au Congrès de Génes: La traite des blanches" | 1880 | Paris |
| "Discours au Congrès de Génes: Des lois sur le vagabondage" | 1880 | Paris |
| "Discours au Congrès de Génes: La provocation" | 1880 | Paris |
| "Discours prononcé à l'issue du Congrès de Génes" | 1880 | Paris |
| "Address at Tenth Anniversary of L.N.A." | 1880 | Liverpool: Brakell |
| "A Call to Action" | 1881 | Birmingham: Hudson |
| "Address at the Conference of Women at Geneva" | 1881 | London: Hazell, Watson and Viney |
| "Letter to the Mothers of England" | 1881 | Liverpool: Brakell |
| "Lettre d'une Mère" | 1881 | Neuchâtel |
| "Lettre à ses amis et compagnons d'auvre" | 1882 | Neuchâtel |
| "Allocution dans la séance d'ouverture de la Conférence de Neuchâtel" | 1882 | Neuchâtel |
| "Allocution à la Chapelle de la Place d'Armes" | 1882 | Neuchâtel |
| "Discours d'Adieux a la Conference de Neuchâtel" | 1882 | Neuchâtel |
| "Dangers of Constructive Legislation in Matters of Purity" | 1883 | Bristol: Arrowsmith |
| "The Bright Side of the Question" | 1883 | Bristol: Arrowsmith |
| "Questions morales" | 1883 | Lausanne |
| "Appel aux dames présentes au Congrès de La Haye" | 1883 | Neuchâtel |
| "Discours dans la sèance d'ouverture du Congrès de La Haye" | 1883 | Neuchâtel |
| "Le point du jour" | 1883 | Neuchâtel |
| "Allocution aux femmes de Gènes" | 1883 | Neuchâtel |
| "The Principles of the Abolitionists" | 1885 | London: Dyer Bros |
| "The Work of the Federation" | 1885 | London: International Abolitionist Federation |
| "Marion, histoire veritable" | 1885 | Neuchâtel |
| "L'œuvre du relèvement moral: Discours prononcé à Naples" | 1886 | Geneva |
| "Our Christianity Tested by the Irish Question" | 1887 | London: T. Fisher Unwin |
| "The Revival and Extension of the Abolitionist Cause" | 1887 | Winchester: Doswell |
| "Letter to International Convention of Women at Washington" | 1888 | London: Morgan & Scott |
| "Zwei Vortrage uber das staatlich regulierte Laster" | 1888 | Mülheim |
| "Letter to World's Women's Christian Temperance Union" | 1892 | Bristol |
| "St. Agnes" | 1893 | London: J Cox |
| "The Present Aspect of the Abolitionist Cause in Relation to British India" | 1893 | London: International Abolitionist Federation |
| "The Lady of Shunem" | 1894 | London: Horace Marshall |
| "The Constitutional Iniquity" | 1895 | London: International Abolitionist Federation |
| "Lettre a Madame Duplan" | 1895 | Lausanne |
| "Two Letters of Earnest Appeal and Warning" | 1895 | London: International Abolitionist Federation |
| "A Doomed Iniquity" | 1896 | London: International Abolitionist Federation |
| "Address to the L.N.A." | 1896 | Bristol: Arrowsmith |
| "Lettre a une ami sur la lutte contre la reglementation dans I'Inde" | 1897 | – |
| "Some Lessons from Contemporary History" | 1898 | London: Friends' Association |
| "Silent Victories" | 1900 | London: Burfoot |
| "L'emancipation telle que je l'ai apprise" | 1900 | Neuchâtel |
| "La cause de la femme et I'avenir du foyer" | 1900 | Geneva |
| "Souvenirs humblement recommandes aux amis de la femme reunis a Paris" | 1900 | Geneva |
| "The Morning Cometh" (Note: Published under the pseudonym Philalethes) | 1903 | Newcastle: Grierson |
| "Lettre aux Membres de la Commission administrative de la Federation" | 1904 | – |

== Notes and references ==
=== Sources ===
- Boyd, Nancy (1982). Three Victorian Women Who Changed Their World: Josephine Butler, Octavia Hill, Florence Nightingale. Oxford: Oxford University Press. ISBN 978-0-333-30057-2.
- Butler, Josephine (1892). Recollections of George Butler. Bristol: J W Arrowsmith. OCLC 315370873.
- Daggers, Jenny; Neal, Diana, eds. (2006). Sex, Gender, and Religion: Josephine Butler Revisited. New York: Peter Lang. ISBN 978-0-8204-8117-3.
- Butler, Josephine (1909). Johnson, George William; Johnson, Lucy A. Nutter (eds.). Josephine E. Butler: an autobiographical memoir. Bristol: J W Arrowsmith. OCLC 15558901.
- Fawcett, Millicent; Turner, E M (1927). Josephine Butler: Her Work and Principles, and Their Meaning for the Twentieth Century. London: Association for Moral & Social Hygiene. OCLC 1252742.
- Jordan, Jane (2001). Josephine Butler. London: Hambledon Continuum. ISBN 978-1-84725-045-2.
- Mathers, Helen (2014). Patron Saint of Prostitutes: Josephine Butler and the Victorian Sex Scandal. Stroud, Glos: The History Press. ISBN 978-0-7524-9209-4.
- Petrie, Glen (1971). Singular Iniquity: Campaigns of Josephine Butler. London: Macmillan. ISBN 978-0-333-11662-3.
- Summers, Anne (Autumn 1999). "'The Constitution Violated': The Female Body and the Female Subject in the Campaigns of Josephine Butler". History Workshop Journal. 48 (48): 1–15. doi:10.1093/hwj/1999.48.1. JSTOR 4289632. PMID 21351675.
- Walkowitz, Judith R (2004). "Butler [née Grey], Josephine Elizabeth". Oxford Dictionary of National Biography (online ed.). Oxford University Press. doi:10.1093/ref:odnb/32214. (Subscription or UK public library membership required.)
