= Josephine Butler =

English feminist and social reformer (1828–1906)

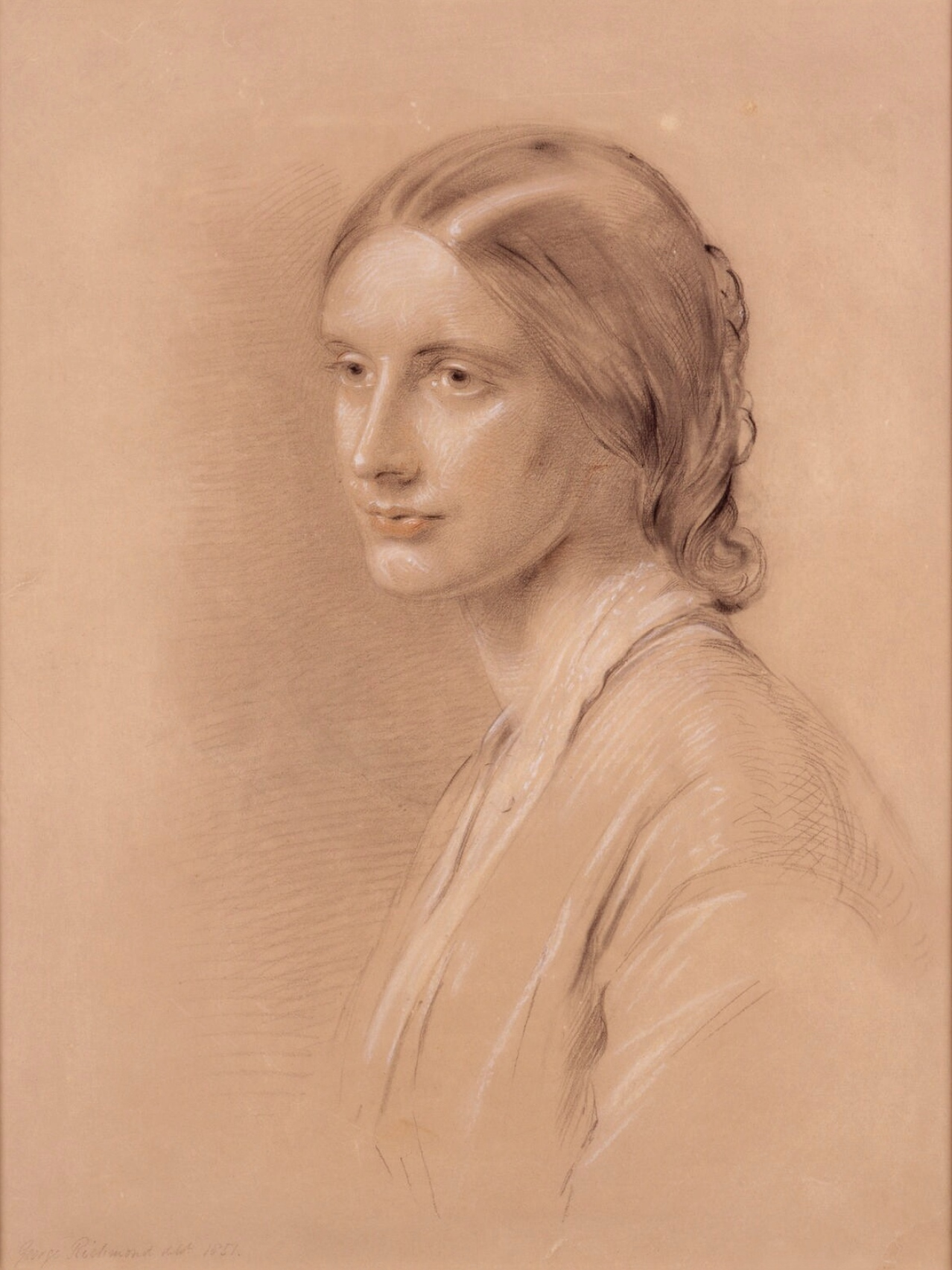
Butler in 1851, portrait by George Richmond

Josephine Elizabeth Butler (née Grey; 13 April 1828 – 30 December 1906) was an English feminist and social reformer in the Victorian era. She campaigned for women's suffrage, the right of women to better education, the end of coverture in British law, the repeal of the Contagious Diseases Acts, the abolition of child prostitution and an end to human trafficking of women and children into European prostitution.

Grey grew up in a well-to-do and politically connected progressive family which helped develop in her a strong social conscience and firmly held religious ideals. She married George Butler, an Anglican divine and schoolmaster, and the couple had four children, the last of whom, Eva, died falling from a banister. The death was a turning point for Butler, and she focused her feelings on helping others, starting with the inhabitants of a local workhouse. She began to campaign for women's rights in British law. In 1869 she became involved in the campaign to repeal the Contagious Diseases Acts, legislation that attempted to control the spread of venereal diseases—particularly in the British Army and Royal Navy—through the forced medical examination of alleged prostitutes, a process she described as surgical or steel rape. The campaign achieved its final success in 1886 with the repeal of the Acts. Butler also formed the International Abolitionist Federation, a Europe-wide organisation to combat similar systems on the continent.

While investigating the effect of the Acts, Butler had been appalled that some of the prostitutes were as young as 12, and that there was a slave trade of young women and children from England to the continent for the purpose of prostitution. A campaign to combat the trafficking led to the removal from office of the head of the Belgian Police des Mœurs, and the trial and imprisonment of his deputy and 12 brothel owners, who were all involved in the trade. Butler fought child prostitution with help from the campaigning editor of The Pall Mall Gazette, William Thomas Stead, who purchased a 13-year-old girl from her mother for £5. The subsequent outcry led to the Criminal Law Amendment Act 1885 which raised the age of consent from 13 to 16 and brought in measures to stop children becoming prostitutes. Her final campaign was in the late-1890s, against the Contagious Diseases Acts which continued to be implemented in the British Raj.

Butler wrote more than 90 books and pamphlets over the course of her career, most of which were in support of her campaigning, although she also produced biographies of her father, her husband and Catherine of Siena. Butler's Christian feminism is celebrated by the Church of England with a Lesser Festival, and by representations of her in the stained glass windows of Liverpool's Anglican Cathedral and St Olave's Church in the City of London. Her name appears on the Reformers Memorial in Kensal Green Cemetery, London, and Durham University named one of their colleges after her. Her campaign strategies changed the way feminist and suffragists conducted future struggles, and her work brought into the political milieu groups of people that had never been active before. After her death in 1906 the feminist leader Millicent Fawcett hailed her as "the most distinguished Englishwoman of the nineteenth century".

== Biography ==
=== Early life; 1828–1850 ===
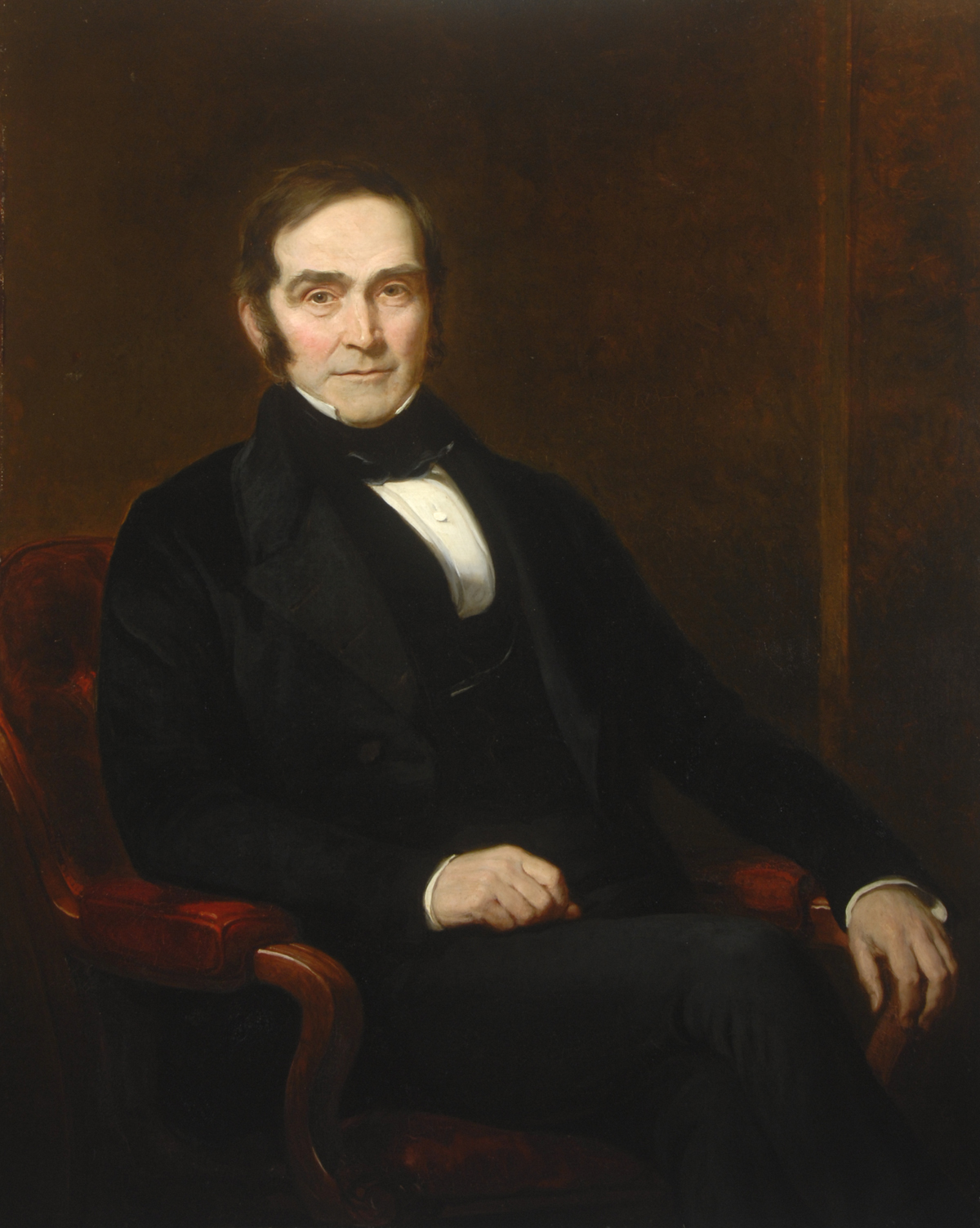
John Grey, Butler's father, portrait by George Patten

Josephine Grey was born on 13 April 1828 at Milfield, Northumberland. She was the fourth daughter and seventh child of Hannah (née Annett) and John Grey, a land agent and agricultural expert, (Note: The couple eventually had ten children, the last of whom was born in May 1836.) who was a cousin of the reformist British Prime Minister, Lord Grey. In 1833 John was appointed manager of the Greenwich Hospital Estates in Dilston, near Corbridge, Northumberland, and the family moved to the area, where John acted as Lord Grey's chief political agent in Northumberland. In this role John promoted his cousin's political opinions locally, including support for Catholic emancipation, the abolition of slavery, the repeal of the Corn Laws and reform of the poor laws. Josephine was taught at home before completing her schooling at a boarding school in Newcastle upon Tyne which she attended for two years.

John treated his children equally within the home. He educated them in politics and social issues and exposed them to various politically important visitors. John's political work and ideology had a strong influence on his daughter, as did the religious teaching she received from her mother; the family background and the circles in which she moved formed a strong social conscience and a staunch religious faith.

At about the age of 17 Grey went through a religious crisis, which probably stemmed from an incident in which she discovered the body of a suicide while out riding. (Note: The man—a valet to a local gentleman—had been dismissed from his position for fathering an illegitimate child; Grey recognised him.) She became disenchanted with her weekly church attendance, describing the local vicar as "an honest man in the pulpit ... [who] taught us loyally all that he probably himself knew about God, but whose words did not even touch the fringe of my soul's deep discontent". Following her crisis, Grey did not identify with any single strand of Christianity, and remained critical of the Anglican church. She later wrote that she "imbibed from childhood the widest ideas of vital Christianity, only it was Christianity. I have not much sympathy with the Church". She began to speak directly to God in her prayers:

I spoke to Him in solitude, as a person who could answer. ... Do not imagine that on these occasions I worked myself up into any excitement; there was much pain in such an effort, and dogged determination required. Nor was it a devotional sentiment that urged me on. It was a desire to know God and my relation to Him.

In mid-1847 Grey visited her brother in County Laois, Ireland. It was at the height of the Great Famine and the first time she had come into contact with widespread suffering among the poor; she was deeply affected by her experiences and later recalled that "As a young girl, I had no conception of the full meaning of the misery I saw around me, yet it printed itself upon my brain and memory."

=== Early married life; 1850–1864 ===
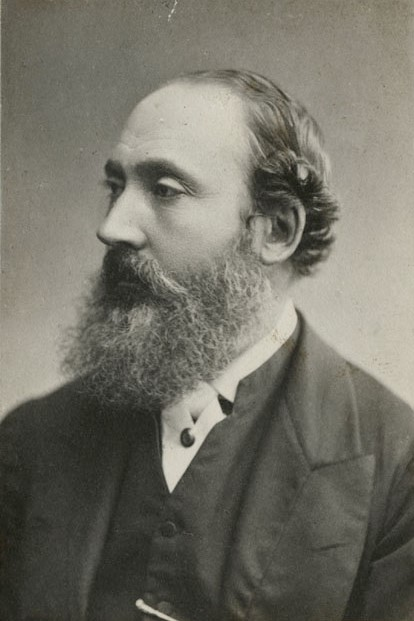
George Butler, Josephine's husband

By 1850 Grey had grown close to George Butler, a Fellow of Exeter College, Oxford, whom she had met at several of the balls hosted around County Durham. (Note: Although she wrote an autobiography and a biography of her husband, Josephine never clarified where or when they first met.) By October that year George was sending her self-penned poems; the couple were engaged in January 1851 and married in January 1852. The Butlers set up home at 124, High Street, Oxford. George was a scholar and cleric and shared with his wife a commitment to liberal reforms and a love of Italian culture. The couple also both had a strong Christian belief and Josephine Butler later wrote of her husband that they often "prayed together that a holy revolution might come about and that the Kingdom of God might be established on the earth".

In November 1852 the Butlers had a son, George Grey Butler, followed by a second, Arthur Stanley—known as Stanley—in May 1854. Butler's later memories of Oxford were of a closeted and misogynist community lacking in family life; she was often the only female at social gatherings and would listen in anger to what her biographer Judith Walkowitz describes as "the open acceptance of the double standard by the gentlemen of the university". Butler was offended by a discussion regarding the publication in 1853 of Elizabeth Gaskell's novel Ruth in which the heroine is seduced by a man of means and subsequently abandoned. Butler saw that the male conversationalists considered it natural that a "moral lapse in a woman was spoken of as an immensely worse thing than in a man"; she decided not to voice her feelings on the point but "to speak little with men, but much with God". As a more practical measure she—and George—began to help many of the fallen woman of Oxford and invited some to live in their house. One case in which they were involved concerned a young woman serving a prison sentence at Newgate Prison. She had been seduced by a university don who had subsequently abandoned her; the woman had murdered her baby in despair. The Butlers contacted the governor of Newgate to arrange for her to stay in their house at the end of her sentence.

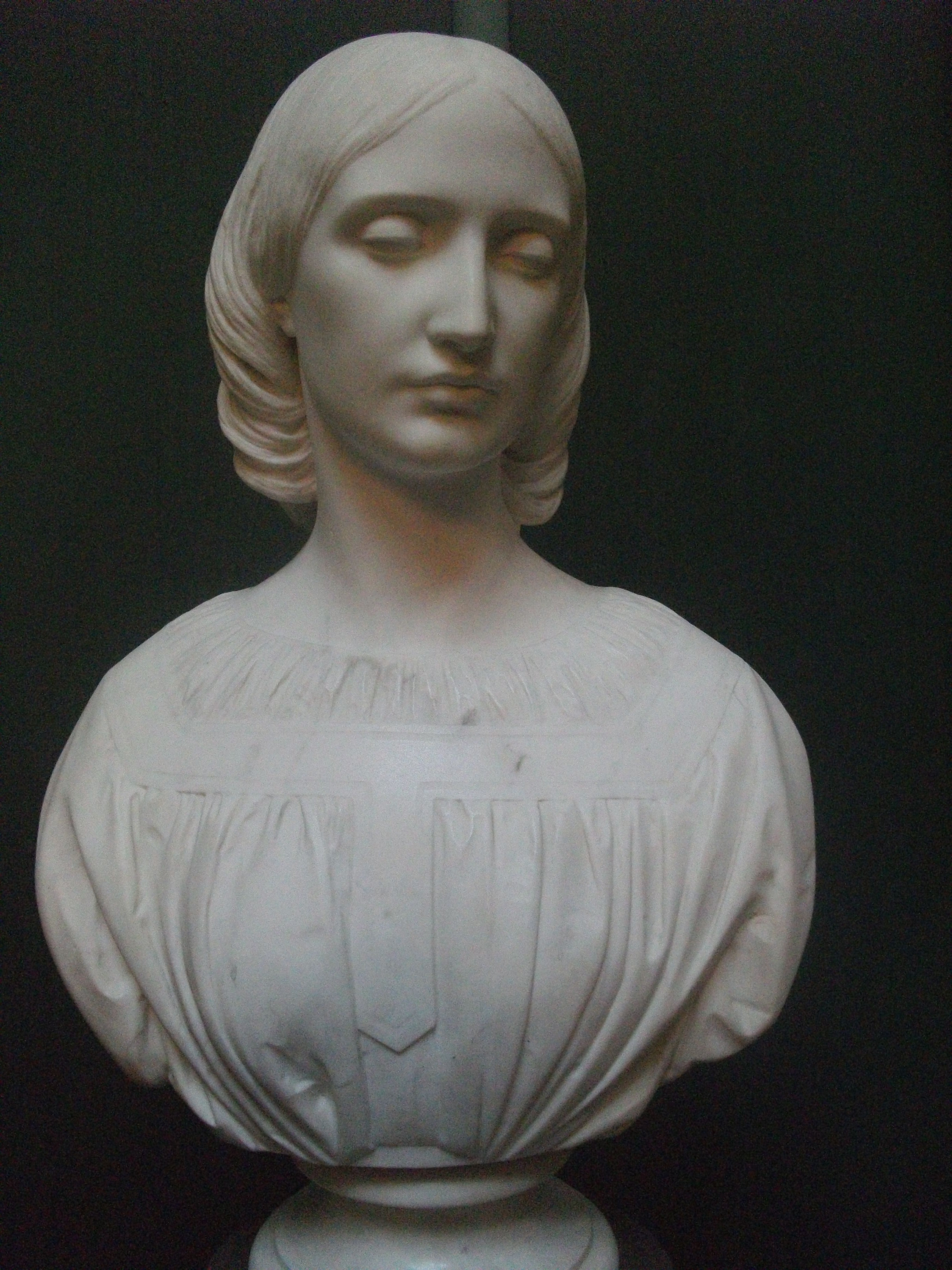
Bust of Butler in 1865, aged 36, by Alexander Munro

In 1856 Butler's health began to suffer from Oxford's damp atmosphere, (Note: Extensive flooding of the local Thames Valley that year had been a contributory factor.) which exacerbated a long-standing lesion on her lung; her doctor informed her that to remain in Oxford could be fatal. As an immediate step George purchased a house in Clifton, near Bristol, where their third son, Charles, was born in 1857. The same year, as a longer-term measure, George took the position of vice-principal at Cheltenham College and they moved to a local house. They continued their support for liberal causes, including that of the Italian nationalist Giuseppe Garibaldi, although their sympathy for the Union side in the American Civil War led to social ostracism; Butler considered that the resultant feeling of social isolation "was often painful ... but the discipline was useful".

In May 1859 Butler gave birth to her final child, a daughter, Evangeline Mary, known as Eva. In August 1864 Eva fell 40 feet (12 m) from the top-floor banister onto the stone floor of the hallway in her home; she died three hours later. Butler was distraught at the loss and had disturbed sleep for several years; she was unable to write about the circumstances until 30 years later. The subsequent inquest gave a verdict of accidental death.

In October 1864 Stanley contracted diphtheria while Butler was still grieving for Eva. She was suffering from depression and was in poor health. After the worst of Stanley's ailment passed, Butler decided to take him to Naples for them both to rest and recuperate. The ship in which they travelled down the west coast of Italy faced rough weather, and Butler had a physical breakdown on board from which she nearly died. (Note: Jordan considers that Butler was suffering a hysterical paralysis, while her biographer, Helen Mathers, describes it as a "psychogenic paralysis, which produces ... [a] dramatic physical manifestation of the patient's emotional suffering".)

=== Liverpool and the start of reform work; 1866–1869 ===
In January 1866 George was appointed headmaster of Liverpool College, and the family moved to premises in the Dingle area. Despite the new surroundings, Butler continued to mourn for Eva but focused her feelings on helping others; she later wrote that she "became possessed with an irresistible urge to go forth and find some pain keener than my own, to meet with people more unhappy than myself. ... It was not difficult to find misery in Liverpool." She made regular visits to the workhouse at Brownlow Hill, an institution that could hold 5,000 individuals. (Note: The workhouse system—brought about by the Poor Law Amendment Act 1834—was a method of providing accommodation and employment to those unable to find work or support themselves. The employment provided was of a menial nature, including digging ditches, grinding corn or breaking stones.) She would sit with the women in the cellars—many of whom were prisoners—and pick oakum with them, while discussing the Bible or praying with them.

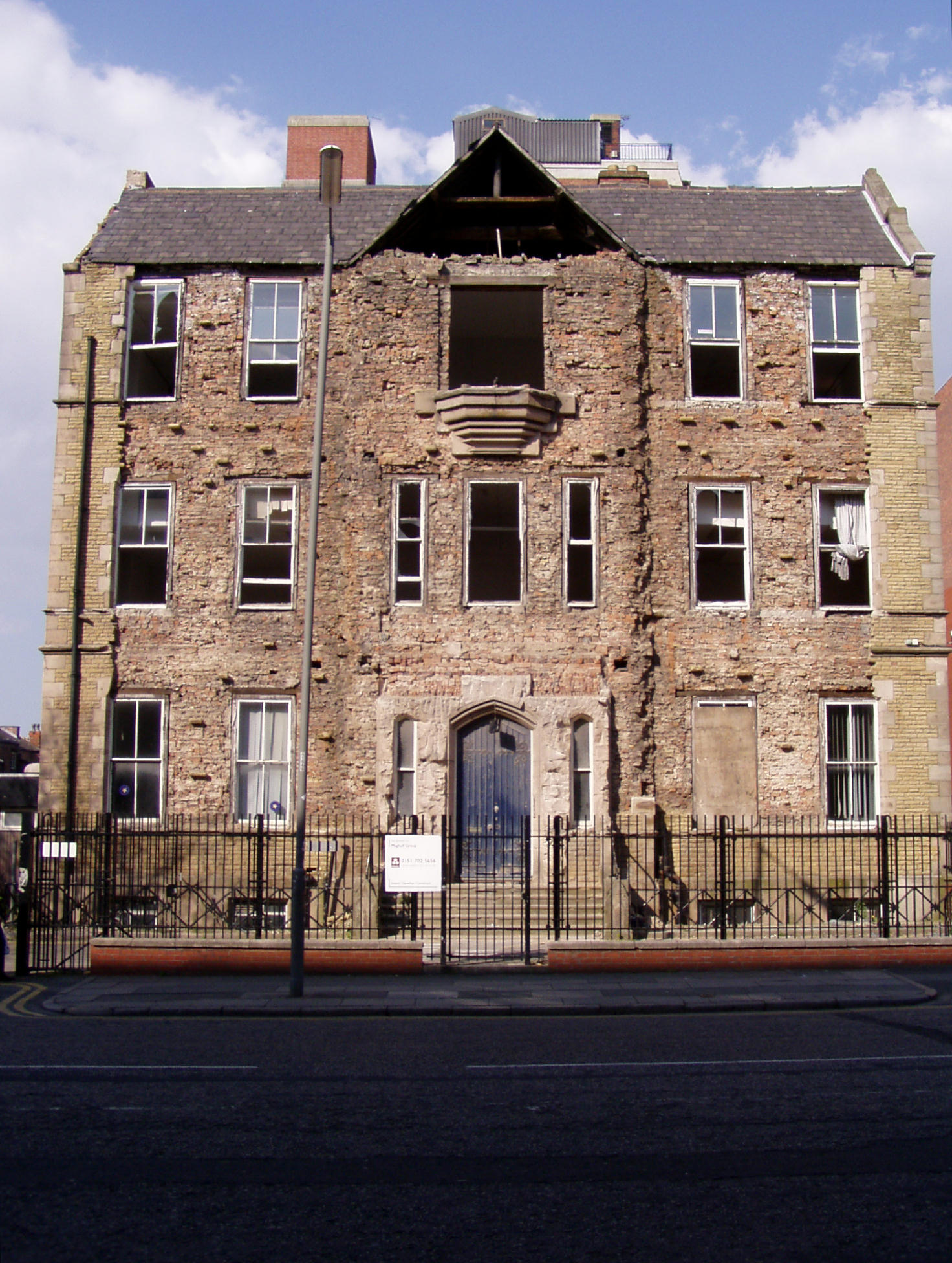
Butler's hostel for women, Liverpool in a derelict condition in 2009 before its demolition

Just as they had done in Cheltenham, the Butlers began providing shelter in their own home for some of the women, often prostitutes in the terminal stages of venereal disease. It soon became clear that there were more women in need than they could provide for, so Butler set up a hostel, with funds from local men of means. By Easter 1867 she had established a second, larger home, in which more appropriate work was provided, such as sewing and the manufacture of envelopes; the "Industrial Home", as she called it, was funded by the workhouse committee and local merchants.

Butler campaigned for women's rights, including the right to the vote and to have a better education. In 1866 she was a signatory on a petition to amend the Reform Bill to widen the franchise to include women. The petition, which was supported by the MP and philosopher John Stuart Mill, was ignored and the bill became law.

Butler considered the Liverpool hostels a stop-gap; women would continue to struggle to find employment until they had been better educated. In 1867, with the suffragist Anne Clough, she established the North of England Council for Promoting the Higher Education of Women, which aimed to raise the status of governesses and female teachers to that of a profession; she served as its president until 1873. A series of lectures, initially in towns in the north of England, began under James Stuart, a Fellow of Trinity College, Cambridge. Although it was thought thirty students would sign up, three hundred joined. In 1868 Butler published "The Education and Employment of Women", her first pamphlet, in which she argued for access to higher education for women, and more equal access to a wider range of jobs. It was the first of 90 books and pamphlets she wrote. That May she petitioned the senate of the University of Cambridge to provide examinations for women; the Cambridge Higher Examination for women was introduced the following year. Jordan notes that "much of the credit for this should go to Anne Clough, but ... Butler played a very influential part ... of the campaign."

At the time British law relating to marriage was based on the legal doctrine of coverture, in which a woman's legal rights and obligations were subsumed by those of her husband upon their matrimony. By law a woman had no separate legal existence, and all her property became her husband's; divorce initiated by a woman was difficult and complicated. In April 1868 Butler and fellow suffragist Elizabeth Wolstenholme set up and became joint secretaries of the Married Women's Property Committee to pressure parliament into changing the law. Butler remained on the committee until the campaign was successful, with the passing into law of the Married Women's Property Act 1882.

=== First attempt to repeal of the Contagious Diseases Acts; 1869–1874 ===
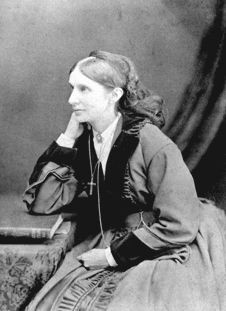
Butler in 1876

In 1869 Butler became aware of the Contagious Diseases Acts. They had been introduced in 1864, 1866 and 1869 to regulate prostitution in an attempt to control the spread of venereal diseases, particularly in the British Army and Royal Navy. The Acts authorised the police to detain women in specific areas (Note: Those areas covered by the Acts were 18 military stations, garrisons and seaport towns, including an area of up to 15 miles from the military installation.) (Note: In 1869 the "Association for the Extension of the Contagious Diseases Acts" was formed to campaign to extend their operation over the whole of the UK.) considered to be prostitutes—no evidence was needed, other than the police officer's word. If a magistrate agreed, women were given genital examinations. If women were suffering from sexually transmitted diseases, they were held in a lock hospital until the condition was cured. If they refused to be examined or hospitalised they could be imprisoned, often with hard labour.

Units of plain-clothed policemen specialised in arresting suspected prostitutes; according to Jordan, the officers were "hated for their surveillance and harassment of prostitutes and working-class women ... who they treated with little regard for their legal rights". Women who were subjected to the examination found their names and reputations affected and, according to the historian Hilary Cashman, "the Acts had the effect of turning them to prostitution by barring respectable ways of life to them".

In September 1869 Wolstenholme met Butler in Bristol to discuss what could be done about the Acts. The National Association for the Repeal of the Contagious Diseases Acts was founded that October, but excluded women from its membership. In response, Wolstenholme and Butler formed the Ladies National Association for the Repeal of the Contagious Diseases Acts (LNA) before the end of the year. The organisation published a Ladies Manifesto, which stated that the Acts were discriminatory on grounds of both sex and class; the Acts, it was claimed:

not only deprived poor women of their constitutional rights and forced them to submit to a degrading internal examination, but they officially sanctioned a double standard of sexual morality, which justified male sexual access to a class of 'fallen' women and penalised women for engaging in the same vice as men.

On 31 December 1869 the Ladies National Association published a statement in The Daily News that it had "been formed for the purposes of obtaining the repeal of these obnoxious Acts". Among the 124 signatories were the social theorist Harriet Martineau and the social reformer Florence Nightingale. (Note: In March 1870 the statement was reprinted in The Shield, a weekly newspaper launched to support the repeal campaign.)

Butler toured Britain in 1870, travelling 3,700 miles to attend 99 meetings in the course of the year. She focused her attention on working-class family men, the majority of whom were outraged at the description Butler gave of the examination women were forced to undergo; she called the process surgical or steel rape. Although she persuaded many members of her audiences, she faced significant opposition, which put her in danger. At one meeting pimps threw cow dung at her; at another, the windows of her hotel were smashed, while at a third, threats were made to burn down the building where she was hosting a meeting.

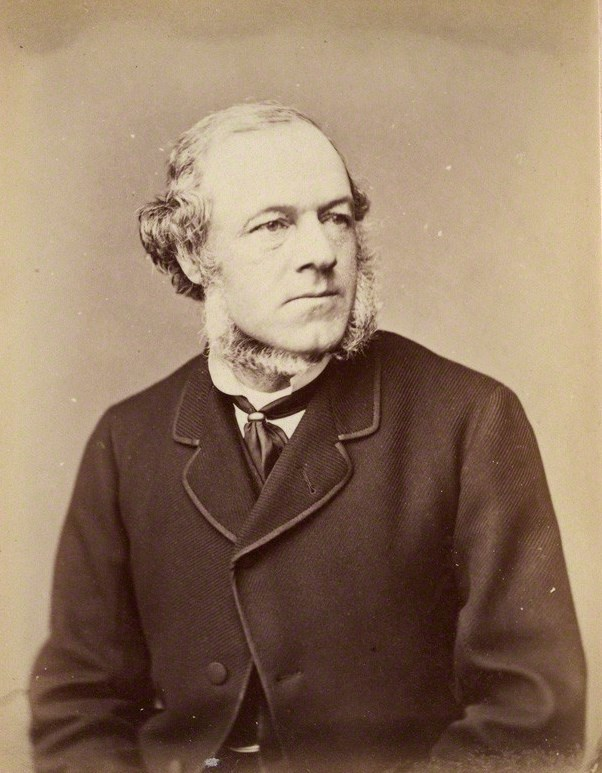
The Home Secretary, Henry Bruce, who set up a Royal Commission in 1871 to examine the Contagious Diseases Acts

At the 1870 Colchester parliamentary by-election the LNA fielded a candidate against the Liberal Party candidate Sir Henry Storks, a supporter of the Acts, who had implemented a similar regime when he commanded the British army in Malta. Butler held several local meetings during the campaign; during one, she was chased by a group of brothel owners. The presence of the LNA candidate split the Liberal vote and allowed the Conservative Party candidate to win the seat; Butler considered that "it proved to be somewhat of a turning-point in the history of our crusade". Because of Stork's loss at the by-election the Home Secretary, Henry Bruce, announced a Royal Commission to examine the situation. One MP told Butler that

Your manifesto has shaken us very badly in the House of Commons; a leading man in the House remarked to me, "We know how to manage any other opposition in the House or in the country, but this is very awkward for us—this revolt of the women. It is quite a new thing; what are we to do with such an opposition as this?"

The commission began work in early January 1871 and spent six months taking evidence. After Butler testified on 18 March, a member of the committee, Liberal MP Peter Rylands, stated: "I am not accustomed to religious phraseology, but I cannot give you an idea of the effect produced except by saying that the spirit of God was there". Nevertheless, the commission's report defended the one-sided nature of the legislation, saying "... there is no comparison to be made between prostitutes and the men who consort with them. With the one sex the offence is committed as a matter of gain; with the other it is an irregular indulgence of a natural impulse." The report accepted the findings that the sexual health of men in the 18 areas covered by the Acts had improved. In relation to the compulsory examinations, the commission was swayed by the descriptions of "steel rape", and suggested it should be voluntary not compulsory. The commission heard significant evidence that many prostitutes were as young as 12 and recommended that the age of consent should be raised from 12 to 14. Bruce took no action on the recommendations for six months.

In February 1872 Bruce proposed a bill that took some of the commission's recommendations, (Note: The bill raised the age of consent to 14 and gave police powers to suppress brothels and crack down on prostitutes under the age of 16.) but widened the geographical scope from the 18 military centres to the whole of the UK. Although the LNA's initial stance was to accept some of the bill's clauses and try and change others, Butler rejected it in its entirety and published The New Era, a 56-page pamphlet attacking the legislation; the pamphlet was re-published in serial form in The Shield. (Note: In The New Era, She pointed out that Bruce's Bill was based on legislation that governed the situation in Berlin, where nearly 30,000 women were being examined; cases of syphilis has risen since the legislation had been introduced.) It was the first split in the repeal movement and she lost many personal supporters because of her stance. The bill faced too much opposition from the parliamentary supporters of the Contagious Diseases Acts, and was withdrawn.

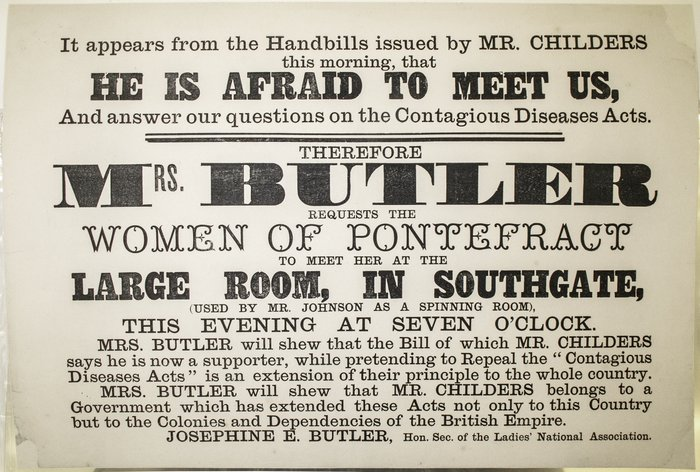
Handbill issued prior to a talk during the 1872 Pontefract by-election

Two months after the withdrawal of Bruce's bill, a ministerial by-election in Pontefract in 1872 gave the LNA an opportunity for further action. Although they did not field a candidate, Butler attended meetings in the town. At one LNA meeting the floor of the room had been liberally sprinkled with cayenne pepper by her opponents, making speaking difficult. After it was cleared away, her opponents set bales of straw alight in a storeroom below, which led to smoke rising through the floorboards; two members of the Metropolitan Police—specially drafted into the town for the by-election—looked on but took no action. (Note: Local residents were appalled at the treatment meted out to the women, and identified 16 men who were among those responsible; all were members of the election committee of the Liberal candidate Hugh Childers.) Although the incumbent Liberal candidate, Hugh Childers, was returned, there were heavy abstentions, and his vote was reduced by around 150 (from an electorate of 2,000). (Note: Childers was also shocked by the events, and made efforts to apprehend those responsible. He also changed his stance on the Contagious Diseases Acts, and in an 1875 speech in the House of Commons he said the legislation failed "in the most marked degree with regard to the principle of equally treating the two sexes, which ought to be the basis for our legislation". He was one of the MPs who voted to finally repeal the Acts in 1886.) In December 1872 Butler met the Prime Minister, William Gladstone, when he visited Liverpool College. Although he supported the aims of the LNA, he was politically unable to back the LNA publicly, and had supported Bruce's bill.

=== European pressure and the white slave trade; 1874–1880 ===
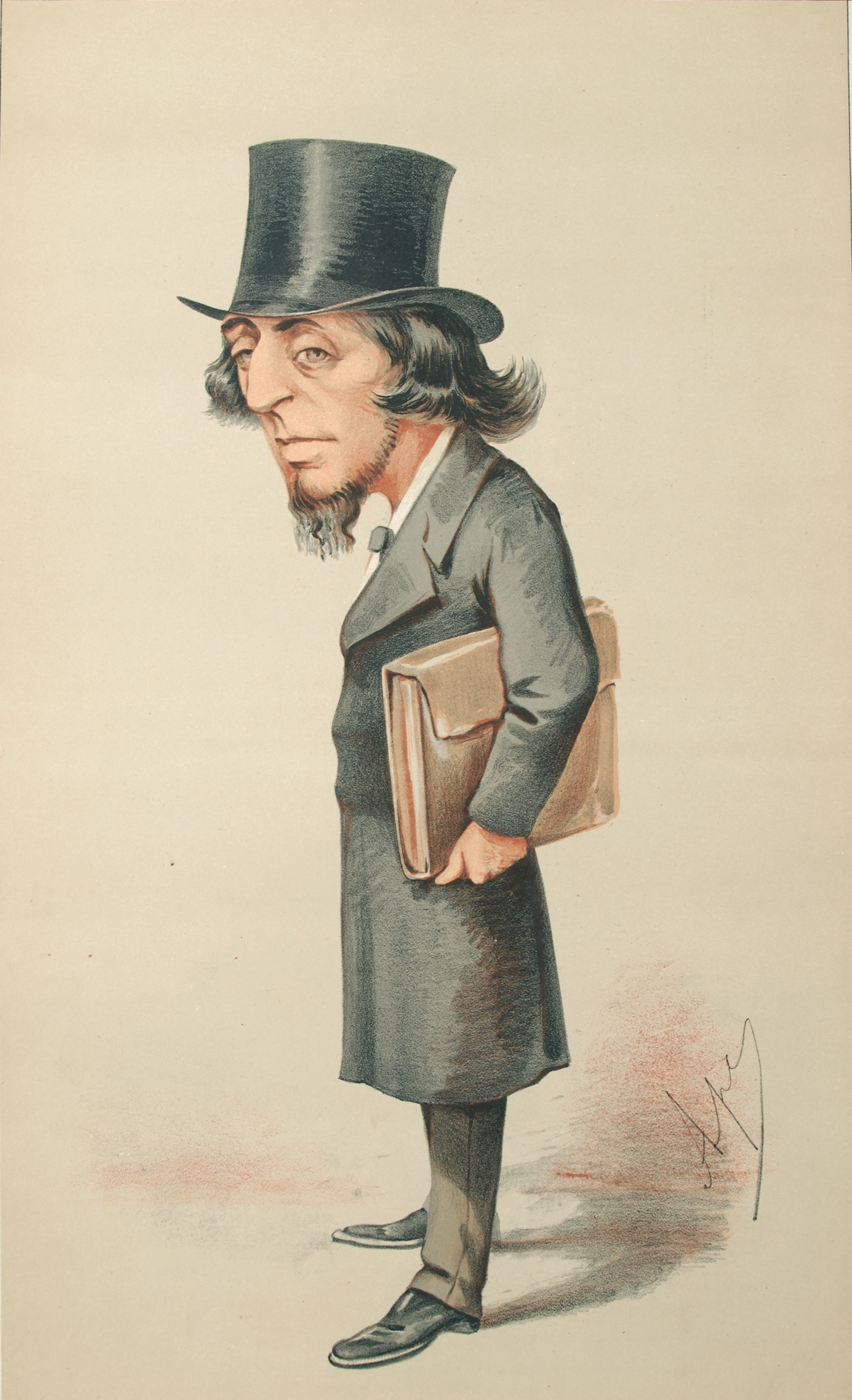
James Stansfeld, the first general secretary of the International Abolitionist Federation, caricature by Carlo Pellegrini in Vanity Fair

The fall of the Liberal government in 1874, and its replacement with Benjamin Disraeli's Conservative administration meant that the repeal campaign stalled; Butler called it a "year of discouragement" when there was "deep depression in the work". Although the LNA kept up the pressure, progress in persuading Liberal MPs to oppose the Contagious Diseases Acts was slow, and the government was implacable in its support of the measures.

At a meeting of regional LNA branches in May, one speech focused on legislation in Europe; the meeting resolved to correspond with sister organisations on the continent to campaign against the Regulation System present in many European countries. At the start of December 1874 Butler left for Paris and a tour that covered France, Italy and Switzerland, where she met with local pressure groups and civic authorities. She encountered strong support from feminist groups, but hostility from the authorities. She returned from her travels at the end of February 1875.

As a result of her experiences, in March 1875 Butler formed the British and Continental Federation for the Abolition of Prostitution (later renamed the International Abolitionist Federation), (Note: Sources disagree about the original name. One source says it was the "British, Continental and General Federation for the Abolition of the Government Regulation of Vice"; another calls it the "British, Continental and General Federation for the Abolition of Government Regulation of Prostitution"; others call it the "British and Continental (later International) Federation for the Abolition of Governmental (later State) Regulation of Vice".) an organisation that campaigned against state regulation of prostitution and for "the abolition of female slavery and the elevation of public morality among men". The Liberal MP James Stansfeld—who wished to repeal the Acts—became the federation's first general secretary; Butler and her friend, the Liberal MP Henry Wilson, became joint secretaries.

In 1878 Butler wrote a biography of Catherine of Siena, which Glen Petrie—her biographer—thought was probably her best work; Walkowitz considers the work provided a "historical justification for her own political activism". Another biographer, Helen Mathers, believes that "in emphasising that she and Catherine were born to be leaders, of both men and women, ... [Butler] made a profound contribution to feminism".

Butler became aware of the slave trade of young women and children from England to mainland Europe in 1879, in what became known as the white slave trade affair. Young girls were considered "fair game", according to Mathers, as the law allowed them to become prostitutes at the age of 13. After playing a minor role in starting an investigation into an accusation of trafficking, (Note: Butler was contacted by Alfred Dyer, a Quaker, who told her details of one case; she put him in touch with the lawyer Alexis Spingard and the men investigated the case—and others—more fully.) Butler became active in the campaign in May 1880, and wrote to The Shield that "the official houses of prostitution in Brussels are crowded with English minor girls", and that in one house "there are immured little children, English girls of from twelve to fifteen years of age ... stolen, kidnapped, betrayed, got from English country villages by every artifice and sold to these human shambles". She visited Brussels where she met the mayor and local councillors and made allegations against the head of the Belgian Police des Mœurs and his deputy as to their involvement in the trade. After the meeting she was contacted by a detective who confirmed that the senior members of the Police des Mœurs were guilty of collusion with brothel keepers. She returned home and filed a deposition containing a copy of the statement from the detective and sent them to the Procureur du Roi (Chief Prosecutor) and the British Home Secretary. Following an investigation in Belgium, the head of the Police des Mœurs was removed from office, and his deputy was put on trial alongside 12 brothel owners; all were imprisoned for their roles in the trade.

=== Second attempt to repeal of the Contagious Diseases Acts; 1880–1885 ===
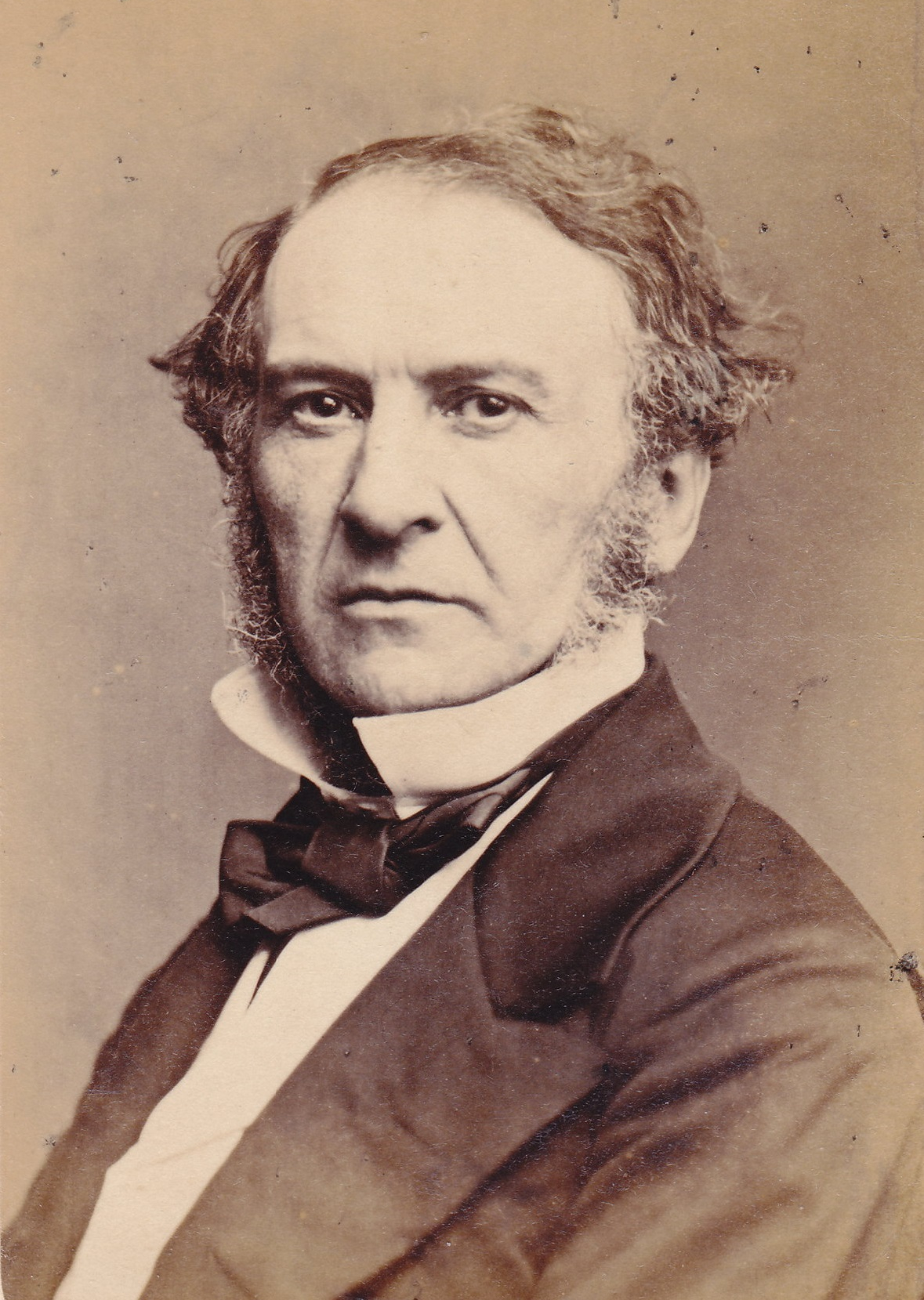
William Gladstone, a friend of the Butlers, and a tacit supporter of Butler's work

The 1880 general election had removed Disraeli's Conservative party from office; they were replaced by Gladstone's second ministry containing a high proportion of MPs who wanted to repeal the Acts. As Prime Minister, Gladstone had the power to nominate candidates to vacant positions within the Church and, in June 1882, he offered George Butler the position of canon of Winchester Cathedral. George had been considering retirement, but he and Josephine were concerned about their finances, as much of their income had been spent on the LNA and other causes Josephine supported. George accepted the appointment, and they moved into a grace and favour home near the cathedral. Josephine Butler set up another hostel for women near their home.

Political pressure from Liberal backbenchers, particularly Joseph Chamberlain and Charles Hopwood, led to increasing opposition to the Acts. In February 1883 Hopwood tabled a resolution in parliament: "That this House disapproves of the compulsory examination of women under the Contagious Diseases Acts", which was debated in April. MPs voted by a majority of 72 to suspend the inspections; three years later the Acts were formally repealed.

=== Child prostitution and Eliza Armstrong; 1885–1887 ===
Two of Butler's allies in the campaign against child prostitution

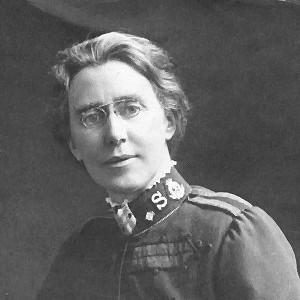
Florence Soper Booth

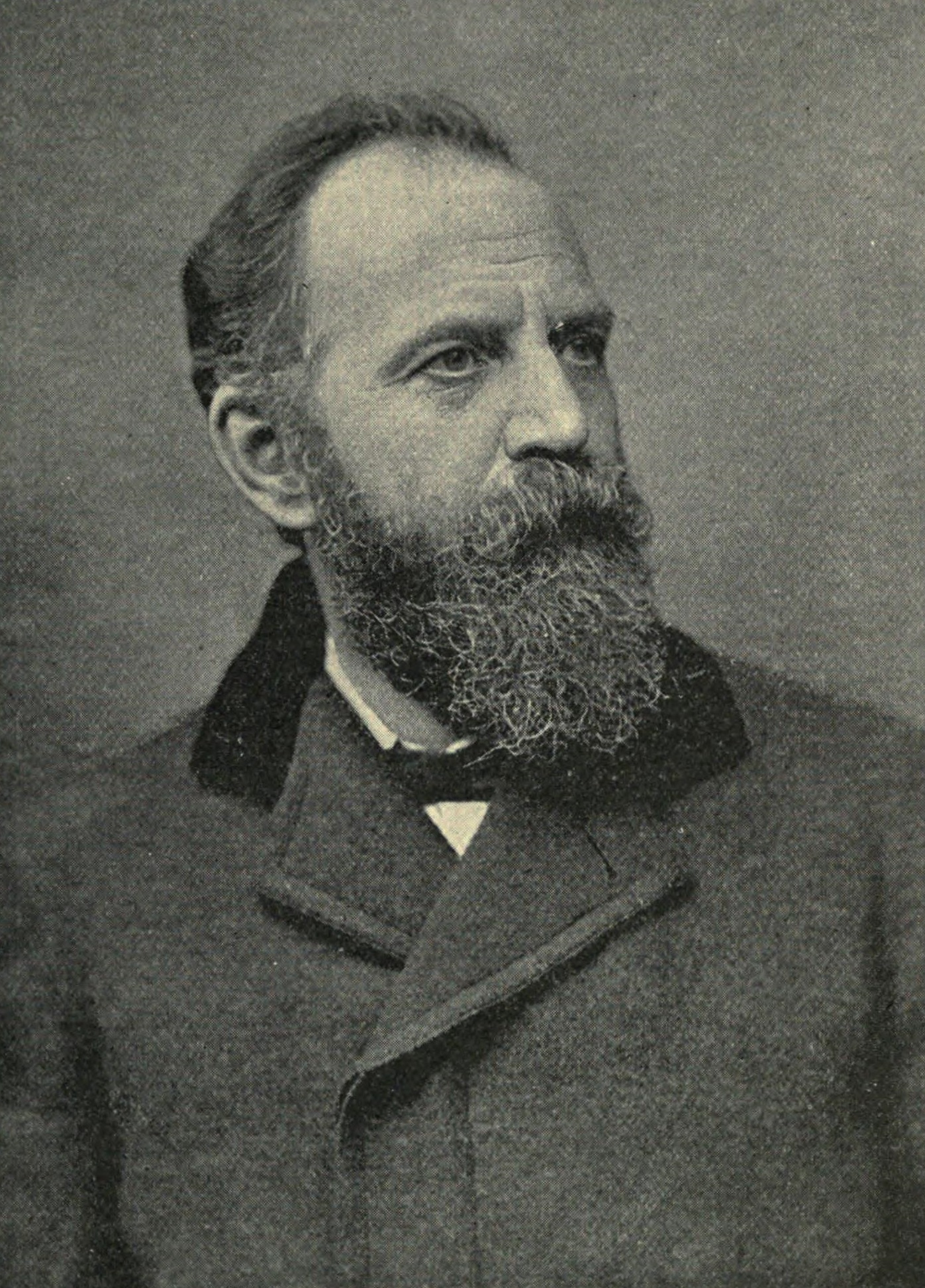
William Thomas Stead

In 1885 Butler met Florence Soper Booth, the daughter-in-law of William Booth, who founded the Salvation Army. The meeting led to Butler's involvement in the campaign to expose child prostitution in Britain and its associated trade. Along with Booth, Benjamin Scott the City Chamberlain and several supporters from the LNA, she persuaded the campaigning editor of The Pall Mall Gazette, William Thomas Stead, to help their cause.

Stead considered the best way to prove that the purchase of young girls for prostitution took place in London, was to buy a girl himself. Butler introduced him to a former prostitute and brothel owner who was staying in her hostel. In a slum in Marylebone, Stead purchased a 13-year-old girl from her mother for £5, and took her to France. (Note: The girl, Eliza Armstrong, was temporarily homed in France before being returned to Britain where she was educated at the Princess Louise Home, Essex, where she was trained for a career in domestic service. Several years later she wrote to Stead thanking him for his actions. By that time she had married and had six children.) In July 1885 Stead began the publication of a series of articles entitled "The Maiden Tribute of Modern Babylon", exposing the extent of child prostitution in London. In the first article—which covered six pages of the Gazette—Stead recounted an interview he had with Howard Vincent, the head of the Criminal Investigation Department:

"But", I said in amazement, "then do you mean to tell me that in very truth actual rapes, in the legal sense of the word, are constantly being perpetrated in London on unwilling virgins, purveyed and procured to rich men at so much a head by keepers of brothels?" "Certainly", said he, "there is not a doubt of it." "Why", I exclaimed, "the very thought is enough to raise hell." "It is true", he said; "and although it ought to raise hell, it does not even raise the neighbours."

On 16 July—ten days after the article was published—Butler gave a speech at a meeting at London's Exeter Hall calling for increased protection for the young and the raising of the age of consent. The following day she and George left for a holiday in Switzerland and France. While they were away, a moribund parliamentary bill from 1883 dealing with the age of consent was re-debated by MPs; the Criminal Law Amendment Act 1885 was passed on 14 August 1885. The Act raised the age of consent from 13 to 16 years of age, while the procurement of girls for prostitution by administering drugs, intimidation or fraud was made a criminal offence, as was the abduction of a girl under 18 for purposes of carnal knowledge. (Note: A late amendment to the bill by Henry Labouchère—Section 11, known as the Labouchere Amendment—created the crime of indecency between men, the first criminalisation on all acts aside from sodomy, which was covered by earlier legislation. Sex between males was illegal in Britain until 1967.) The police investigated Stead's purchase, and Butler was forced to cut her holiday short to return for questioning. Although she avoided all charges, Stead was imprisoned for three months.

The passing of the Criminal Law Amendment Act led to the formation of purity societies, such as the White Cross Army, whose aims were to force the closure of brothels through prosecution. The societies widened their remit to suppress what they considered indecent literature—including information on birth control—and the entertainment provided by the music halls. Butler warned against the purity societies because of their "fatuous belief that you can oblige human beings to be moral by force, and in so doing that you may in some way promote social purity". Her warnings went unheeded by other suffragists, and some, such as Millicent Fawcett—who was later Butler's biographer—continued to combine their activities in the feminist movement with the work for the purity societies.

=== India, Empire and the final years; 1897–1906 ===
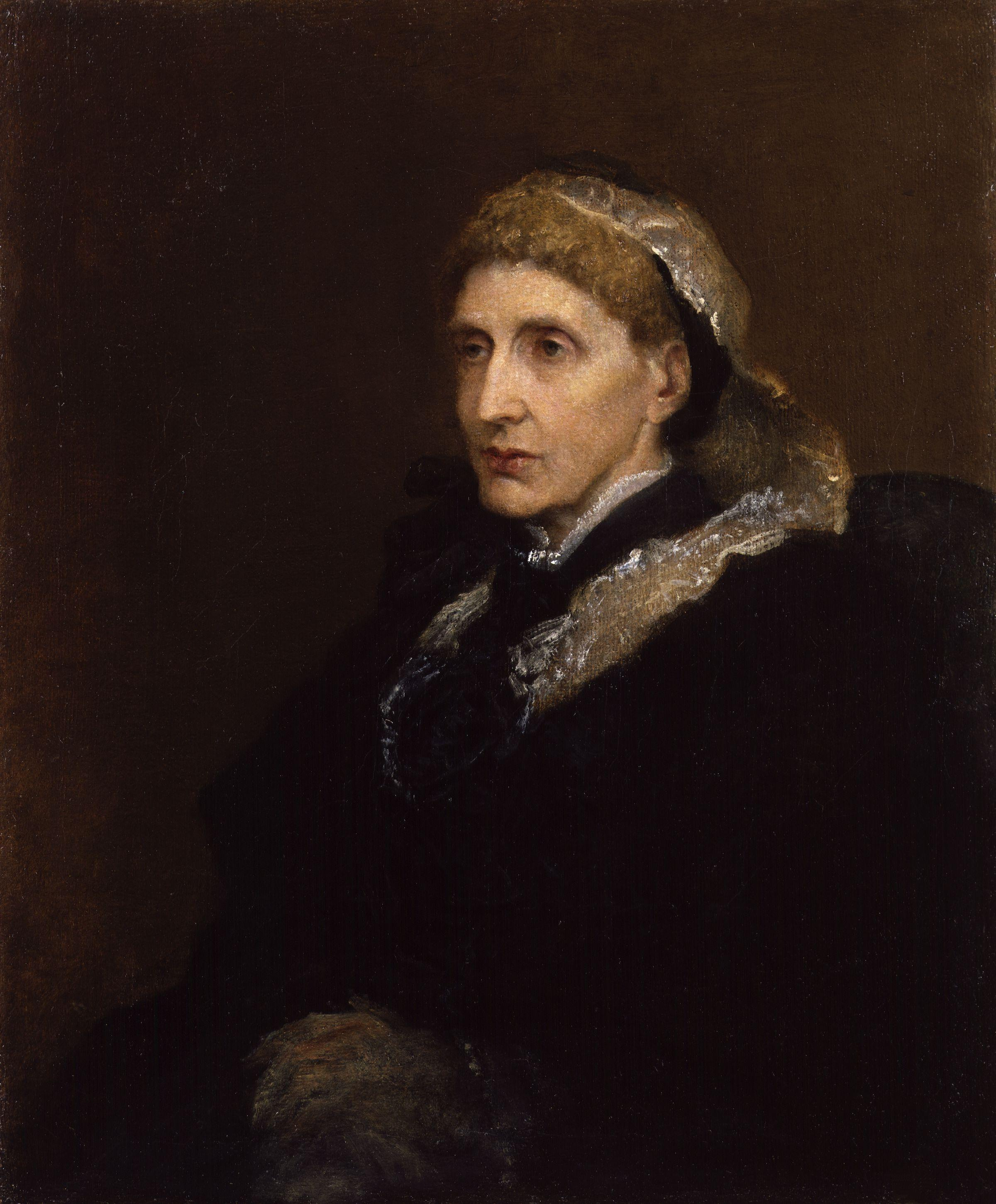
Butler in old age, by George Frederic Watts, 1894

Although the Contagious Diseases Acts had been repealed in the UK, the equivalent legislation was active in the British Raj in India, where prostitutes near the British cantonments were subjected to regular forced examinations. The relevant law was contained in the Special Cantonments Acts which had been put on to a practical footing by Major-General Edward Chapman, who issued standing orders for the inspection of prostitutes, and the provision of "a sufficient number of women, to take care that they are sufficiently attractive, to provide them with proper houses".

Butler began a new campaign to have the legislation repealed, comparing the girls to slaves. After the campaign put pressure on MPs, the widespread publication of Chapman's orders led to what Mathers describes as "outrage across Britain". In June 1888 the House of Commons passed a unanimous resolution repealing the legislation, and the Indian government was ordered to cancel the Acts. To circumvent the order, the India Office advised the Viceroy of India to instigate new legislation ensuring that prostitutes suspected of carrying contagious diseases had to undergo an examination or face expulsion from the cantonment.

Towards the end of the 1880s George's health began to decline, and Butler spent increasing time looking after him. They holidayed in Naples in 1889, but George contracted influenza in the 1889–90 pandemic. They returned to Britain but George died on 14 March 1890; Butler suspended campaigning in the aftermath of his death. Soon after, she left Winchester, and moved to a house in Wimbledon, London, which she shared with her eldest son and his wife.

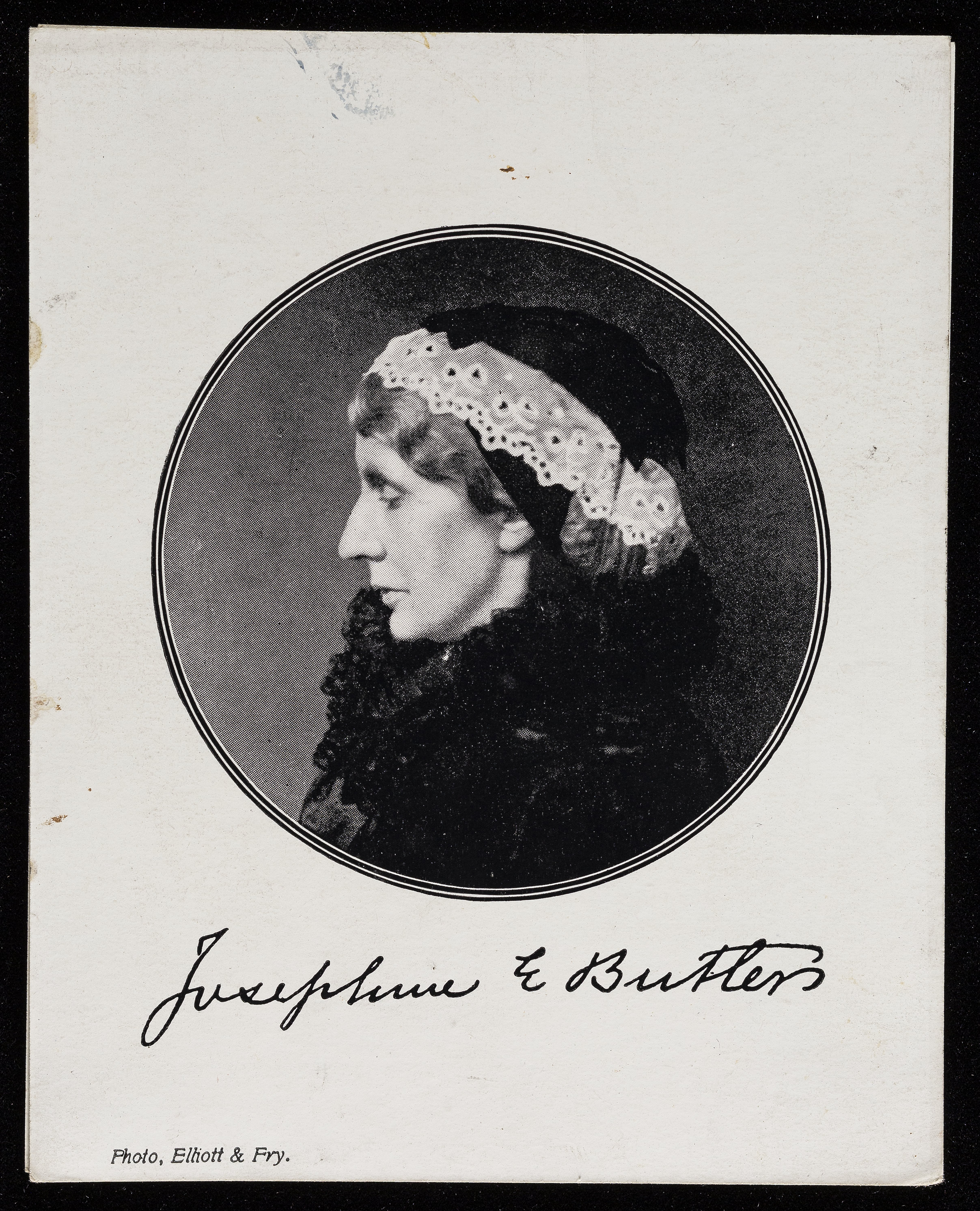
Undated photograph of Butler

Butler, at 62, felt she was too old to travel to India, but two American supporters visited on her behalf and spent four months building a dossier showing that the lock hospitals, compulsory examination and use of underage prostitutes—some as young as 11—were all continuing to operate. The campaign in Britain pushed again for changes, and Butler spoke at meetings, published pamphlets and wrote to missionaries in India.

Although many of Butler's friends and supporters of shared causes spoke out against British Imperial Policy, Butler did not. She wrote that because of the work Britain had undertaken in making slavery illegal, "[w]ith all her faults, looked at from God's point of view, England is the best, and the least guilty of the nations". During the Second Boer War (1899–1902), Butler published Native Races and the War (1900), in which she supported British action and its imperialist policy. In the book she took a strong line against the casual racism inherent in her countrymen's dealings with foreigners, writing:

Great Britain will in future be judged, condemned or justified, according to her treatment of those innumerable, coloured races, heathen or partly Christianized, over whom her rule extends ... Race prejudice is a poison which will have to be cast out if the world is ever to be Christianized, and if Great Britain is to maintain the high and responsible place among the nations which has been given to her.

From 1901 Butler began to withdraw from public life, resigning her positions in the campaign organisations and spending more time with her family. In 1903 she moved to Wooler in Northumberland, to live near her eldest son. On 30 December 1906 she died at home and was buried in the nearby village of Kirknewton.

== Approach, analysis and legacy ==
Two memorials to Butler

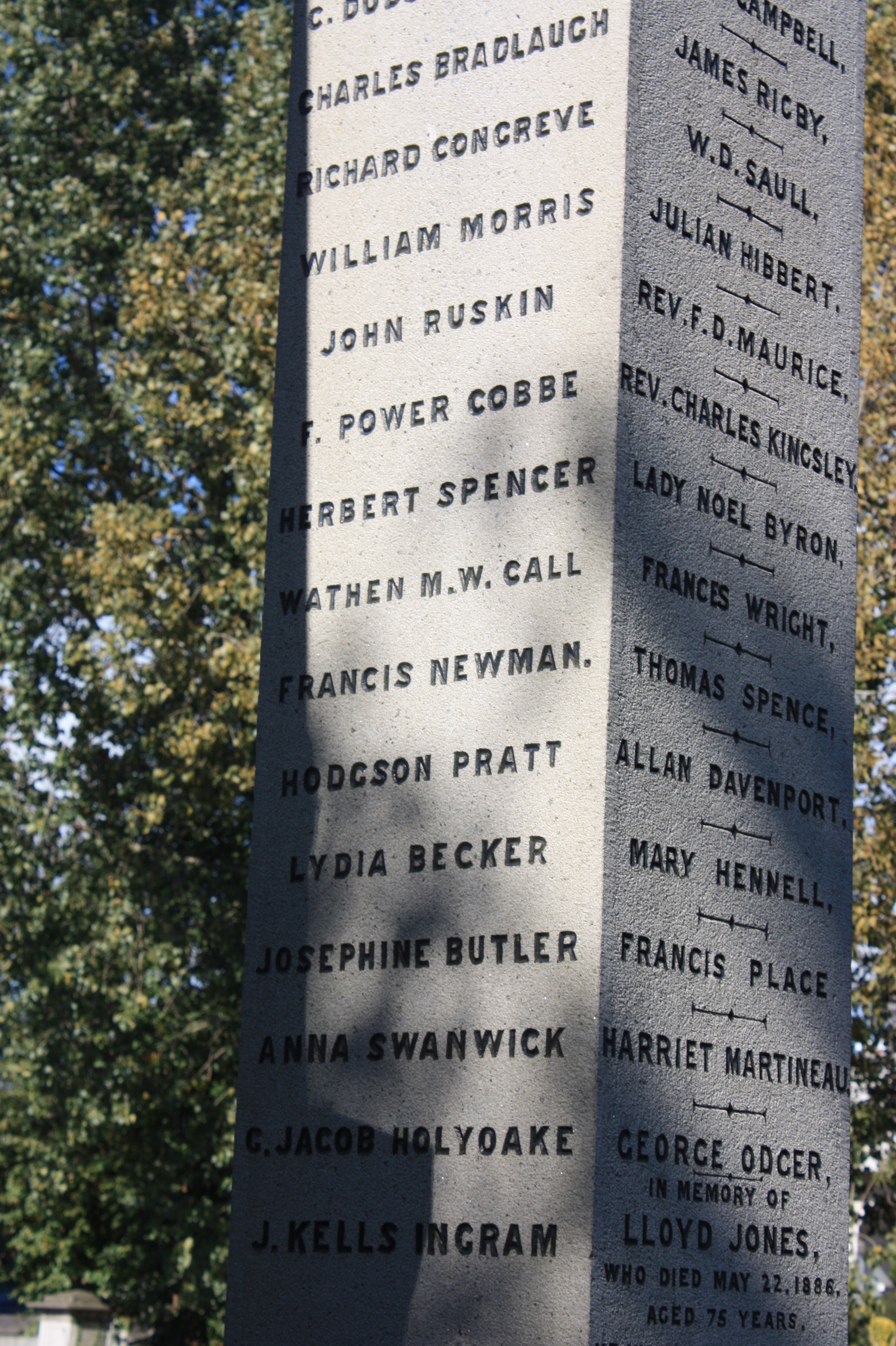
Butler's name on the lower section of the Reformers memorial, Kensal Green Cemetery

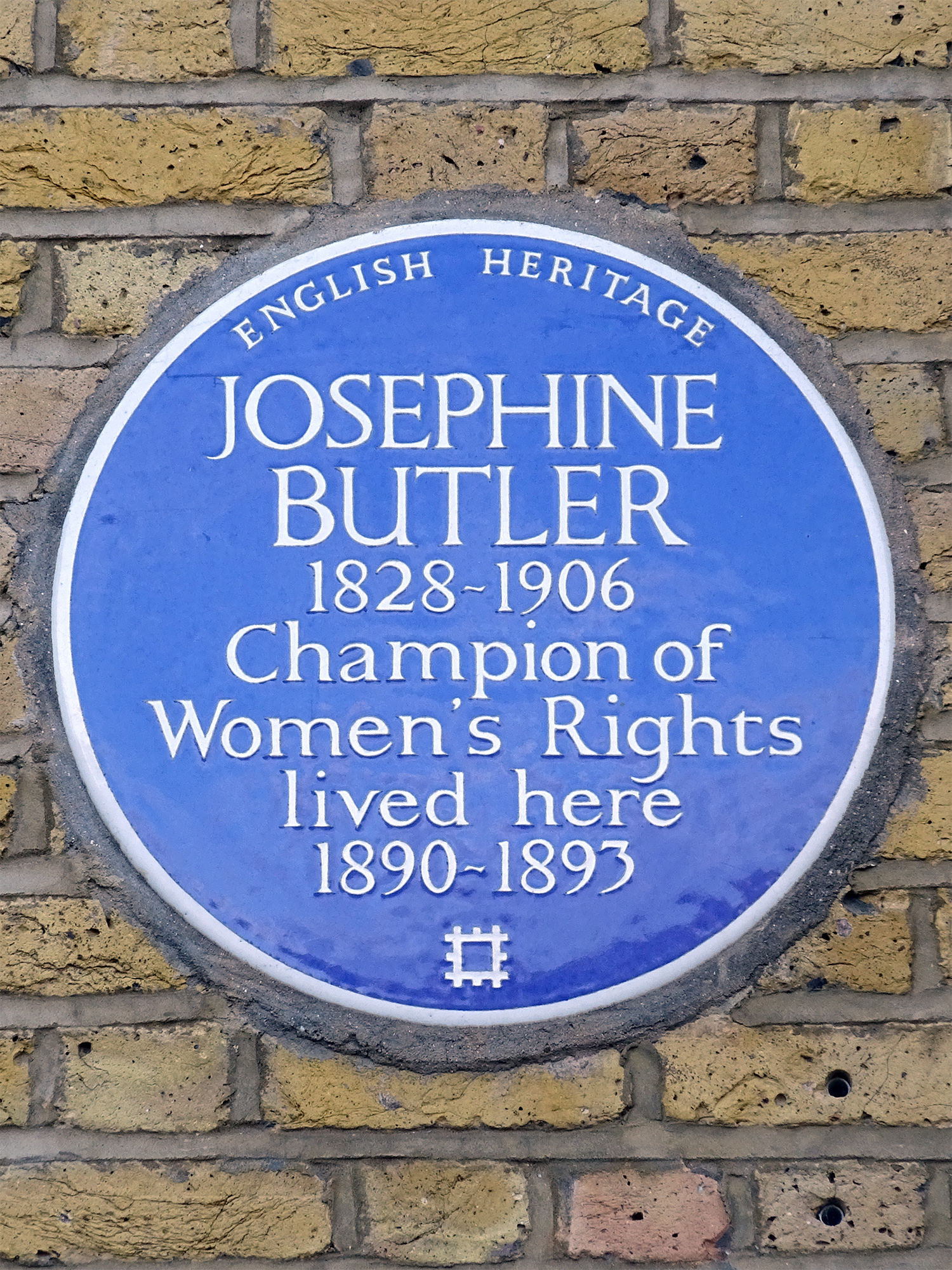
The blue plaque erected in 2001 by English Heritage at Butler's former residence in Wimbledon

In 1907 Josephine Butler's name was added to the south side of the Reformers' Memorial in Kensal Green Cemetery, London. The memorial was erected for those "who had defied custom and interest for the sake of conscience and public good". She is celebrated in the Church of England with a Lesser Festival on 30 May, and represented in a stained glass window in Liverpool's Anglican Cathedral, All Saints' Church, Cambridge and St Olave's Church in the City of London.

Her connections to Liverpool were memorialised in a more secular fashion. A building in the Faculty of Business and Law at Liverpool John Moores University was named "Josephine Butler House". The building, originally the first Radium Institute in the UK, in the Cultural Quarter in Hope Street, was built in 1867 and demolished in 2013 when the site became a car park and subsequently student housing which opened in 2015.

In 1915 the LNA merged with the International Abolitionist Federation to form the Association of Moral and Social Hygiene, which changed its name to the Josephine Butler Society in 1953. As at 2017 the society still operates; it campaigns for the protection of prostitutes and provides "protection for women and children who are criminally detained, violently abused or exploited by others who profit from their prostitution".

In 2005 Durham University named Josephine Butler College after her, reflecting her and George's connection to the area and the university. The Women's Library, at the London School of Economics, holds a number of collections related to Butler. They include papers from the Ladies' National Association; more than 2,500 letters in the Josephine Butler Letter Collection; and the Josephine Butler Society Library consisting of books and pamphlets collected by the society. In 2001 English Heritage placed a blue plaque on her former residence in Wimbledon; her former house in Cheltenham was demolished in the 1970s, but in 2002 the Cheltenham Civic Society placed a plaque on the building which now occupies the site.

Butler was not only a staunch feminist but a passionate Christian, whose favourite phrase was "God and one woman make a majority". Although staunchly liberal, she felt constant tensions between her liberal and feminist philosophies. According to the feminist historian Barbara Caine, "Liberalism provided the framework for Butler's whole social and political approach. It was an integral part of her feminism", although it was in conflict with the liberal approach to sexuality and desire. Butler resolved the conflict through her religion.

According to Walkowitz, Butler "pushed liberal feminism in new directions, developing theories and methods of political agitation that directly affected future campaigns for the emancipation of women". She developed new approaches to campaigning and moved the debate beyond discussions in middle-class houses to the public forum, bringing into the political debate women who had never been involved before. Butler's campaigning, says Walkowitz, "not only reshaped gender, class, and sexual subjectivities in late Victorian Britain but also informed national political history and state-building".

Numerous historians consider the success of the campaign to repeal the Contagious Diseases Acts to be a milestone in the history of female emancipation. According to the political historian Margaret Hamilton, the campaign showed that "attitudes toward women were changing". The feminist scholar Sheila Jeffreys says that Butler is "one of the bravest and most imaginative feminists in history", while Fawcett wrote that she was "convinced that ... [Butler] should take the rank of the most distinguished Englishwoman of the nineteenth century". Her unnamed obituarist in The Daily News considered that Butler's name

will always rank amongst the noblest of the social reformers, the fruit of whose labours is the highest inheritance that we have. She fought with enormous courage and self-sacrifice in a battlefield where she was subjected to the fiercest antagonism ... She never faltered in her task, and it is to her in supreme that the English statute book owes the removal of one of the greatest blots that ever defaced it. Her victory marked one of the great stages of progress of woman to that equality of treatment which is the final test of a nation's civilization.

== See also ==
- History of feminism
- List of suffragists and suffragettes

== Notes and references ==
=== Sources ===
- Beeson, Trevor (2011). The Church's Other Half: Women's Ministry. London: SCM Press. ISBN 978-0-334-04382-9.
- Boyd, Nancy (1982). Three Victorian Women Who Changed Their World: Josephine Butler, Octavia Hill, Florence Nightingale. Oxford: Oxford University Press. ISBN 978-0-333-30057-2.
- Butler, Arthur (1954). Portrait of Josephine Butler. London: Faber & Faber. OCLC 4025069.
- Butler, Josephine (1887). Our Christianity Tested by the Irish Question. London: T Fisher Unwin. JSTOR 60214285. OCLC 908833972.
- Butler, Josephine (1892). Recollections of George Butler. Bristol: J W Arrowsmith. OCLC 315370873.
- Butler, Josephine (1900). Native Races and the War. London: Gay & Bird. OCLC 10402401.
- Butler, Josephine (1909). Johnson, George William; Johnson, Lucy A. Nutter (eds.). Josephine E. Butler: an autobiographical memoir. Bristol: J W Arrowsmith. OCLC 15558901.
- Butler, Josephine (1910) [1896]. Personal Reminiscences of a Great Crusade. London: H Marshall & Son. OCLC 26954275.
- Butler, Josephine (2003). Jordan, Jane; Sharp, Ingrid (eds.). Josephine Butler and the Prostitution Campaigns: Child prostitution and the age of consent. London: Routledge. ISBN 978-0-415-22688-2.
- Caine, Barbara (1993). Victorian Feminists. Oxford: Oxford University Press. doi:10.1093/acprof:oso/9780198204336.001.0001. ISBN 978-0-19-820433-6.
- Cashman, Hilary (January 1990). "Singular Iniquities: Josephine Butler and Marietta Higgs". New Blackfriars. 71 (834): 26–32. doi:10.1111/j.1741-2005.1990.tb01380.x. JSTOR 43248476.
- Crawford, Elizabeth (2003). The Women's Suffrage Movement: A Reference Guide 1866–1928. London: Routledge. ISBN 1-135-43402-6.
- Daggers, Jenny; Neal, Diana, eds. (2006). "Introduction". Sex, Gender, and Religion: Josephine Butler Revisited. New York: Peter Lang. ISBN 978-0-8204-8117-3.
- D'Itri, Patricia Ward (1999). Cross Currents in the International Women's Movement, 1848–1948. Bowling Green, OH: Bowling Green State University Popular Press. ISBN 978-0-87972-782-6.
- Farmer, Lindsay (2016). Making the Modern Criminal Law: Criminalization and Civil Order. Oxford: Oxford University Press. ISBN 978-0-19-105859-2.
- Fawcett, Millicent; Turner, E M (1927). Josephine Butler: Her Work and Principles, and Their Meaning for the Twentieth Century. London: Association for Moral & Social Hygiene. OCLC 1252742.
- Garner, Rod (2009). Josephine Butler. London: Darton Longman & Todd. ISBN 978-0-232-52747-6.
- Gordon, Peter; Doughan, David (2014). Dictionary of British Women's Organisations, 1825–1960. London: Routledge. ISBN 978-0-7130-4045-6.
- Hamilton, Margaret (Spring 1978). "Opposition to the Contagious Diseases Acts, 1864–1886". Albion. 10 (1): 14–27. doi:10.2307/4048453. JSTOR 4048453.
- Harrington, Carol (2013). Politicization of Sexual Violence: From Abolitionism to Peacekeeping. Farnham, Surrey: Ashgate Publishing. ISBN 978-1-4094-9963-3.
- Jordan, Jane (2001). Josephine Butler. London: Hambledon Continuum. ISBN 978-1-84725-045-2.
- Le Feuvre, Cathy (2015). The Armstrong Girl: A child for sale: the battle against the Victorian sex trade (Kindle ed.). Oxford: Lion Books. ISBN 978-0-7459-6821-6.
- Limoncelli, Stephanie (2010). The Politics of Trafficking: The First International Movement to Combat the Sexual Exploitation of Women. Stanford, CA: Stanford University Press. ISBN 978-0-8047-6294-6.
- Mathers, Helen (2014). Patron Saint of Prostitutes: Josephine Butler and the Victorian Sex Scandal. Stroud, Gloucestershire: The History Press. ISBN 978-0-7524-9209-4.
- Matthew, H C G (2004). "Butler, George". Oxford Dictionary of National Biography (online ed.). Oxford University Press. doi:10.1093/ref:odnb/4184. (Subscription, Wikipedia Library access or UK public library membership required.)
- Petrie, Glen (1971). Singular Iniquity: Campaigns of Josephine Butler. London: Macmillan. ISBN 978-0-333-11662-3.
- Report of Royal Commission upon the Administration and Operation of the Contagious Diseases Acts. London: Her Majesty's Stationery Office. 1871. OCLC 23264353.
- Selfe, David W; Burke, Vincent (2012). Perspectives on Sex Crime & Society. Oxford: Routledge. ISBN 978-1-135-34063-6.
- Snell, K D M (1987). Annals of the Labouring Poor: Social Change and Agrarian England, 1660–1900. Cambridge: Cambridge University Press. ISBN 978-0-521-33558-4.
- Strachey, Ray (March 1928). "The Centenary of Josephine Butler: An Interview with Dame Millicent Garrett Fawcett". Social Service Review. 2 (1): 1–9. doi:10.1086/630351. JSTOR 30009144. S2CID 143555932.
- Summers, Anne (Autumn 1999). "'The Constitution Violated': The Female Body and the Female Subject in the Campaigns of Josephine Butler". History Workshop Journal. 48 (48): 1–15. doi:10.1093/hwj/1999.48.1. JSTOR 4289632. PMID 21351675.
- Summers, Anne (Autumn 2006). "Which Women? What Europe? Josephine Butler and the International Abolitionist Federation". History Workshop Journal. 62 (62): 214–31. doi:10.1093/hwj/dbl005. JSTOR 25472881. S2CID 153801026.
- Thompson, F M L (2004). "Grey, John". Oxford Dictionary of National Biography (online ed.). Oxford University Press. doi:10.1093/ref:odnb/11550. (Subscription, Wikipedia Library access or UK public library membership required.)
- Walkowitz, Judith R (1982a). Prostitution and Victorian Society: Women, Class, and the State. Cambridge: Cambridge University Press. ISBN 978-0-521-27064-9.
- Walkowitz, Judith R (Spring 1982). "Male Vice and Feminist Virtue: Feminism and the Politics of Prostitution in Nineteenth-Century Britain". History Workshop. 13 (13): 79–93. doi:10.1093/hwj/13.1.79. JSTOR 4288404.
- Walkowitz, Judith R (2004). "Butler [née Grey], Josephine Elizabeth". Oxford Dictionary of National Biography (online ed.). Oxford University Press. doi:10.1093/ref:odnb/32214. (Subscription, Wikipedia Library access or UK public library membership required.)
- Williams, Chris (2006). A Companion to 19th-Century Britain. Oxford: Blackwell Publishing. ISBN 978-1-4051-5679-0.
- Williamson, Joseph (1977). Josephine Butler: The Forgotten Saint. Leighton Buzzard: Faith Press. ISBN 978-0-7164-0485-9.
