= Georgina Schuyler =

American composer and writer (1841–1923)

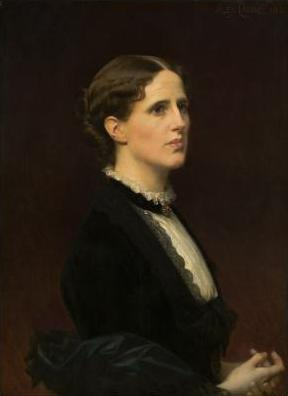
- Oil on canvas painting by Alexandre Cabanel
- Born: 1841; New York City, US
- Died: December 25, 1923 (aged 81–82)
- Occupations: Composer and writer
- Relatives: Louisa Lee Schuyler (sister)

Georgina Schuyler (1841 – December 25, 1923) was an American composer and article writer and great granddaughter of founding father Alexander Hamilton and Elizabeth Schuyler Hamilton. She was a member of multiple societies. From 1901 to 1903, Schuyler led the campaign to have Emma Lazarus's poem "The New Colossus" placed in the pedestal of the Statue of Liberty. The plaque was placed inside the statue's pedestal in 1903.

== Career ==
Schuyler was a part of the soldiers' aid societies within Westchester County, New York during the Civil War. She was also a part of the Hospital Book and Newspaper Society within the United States Sanitary Commission. A 14-song collection of her compositions was published in 1886.

Schuyler was a friend of Emma Lazarus and after Lazarus died in 1887, Schuyler found Lazarus's poem "The New Colossus" in 1901. She led the campaign to have "The New Colossus" placed in the pedestal of the Statue of Liberty. It took until 1903 for the poem to be placed in the pedestal on a wall, later being placed inside an exhibit within the pedestal in 1986.

The governor of New York chose her to be a trustee of the Schuyler Mansion in 1911 and she was the author of The Schuyler Mansion at Albany. The Century: 1897, Volume 55 stated that Schuyler's music is true art. Schuyler also wrote articles about history and genealogy. She was in the Society of the Colonial Dames of America. Schuyler was also a philanthropist, art patron, and a supporter of the social reform programs that were started by her sister Louisa.

== Personal life ==
Schuyler was born on 1841 in New York City to George Lee Schuyler and Eliza (née Hamilton). She is a descendant of Alexander Hamilton and Elizabeth Schuyler Hamilton. She attended private schools, including Elizabeth Cabot Agassiz's School for Girls in 1858 in Cambridge, Massachusetts.

Schuyler, who never married, died at her home, 570 Park Avenue in New York City where she lived with her sister, Louisa, on December 25, 1923.
