= George Butler (1819–1890) =

English divine and schoolmaster

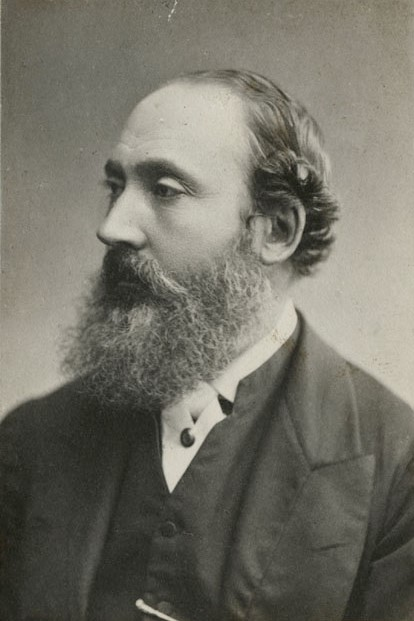
Butler, date unknown

The Reverend Canon George Butler (11 June 1819 – 14 March 1890) was an English Anglican priest and schoolmaster who was Principal of Liverpool College and later canon of Winchester Cathedral.

== Background ==
Born in Harrow in 1819, Butler was from a family that had great educational influence in the 19th century, more than that of Arnold of Rugby. His father the Very Rev. George Butler Senior had left Cambridge as a senior wrangler and later became headmaster of Harrow School and Dean of Peterborough. His brother the Very Reverend Henry Montagu Butler followed his father's footsteps and also became headmaster of Harrow School, later becoming Dean of Gloucester and Master of Trinity College, Cambridge. Another brother, the Rev. Arthur Gray Butler, became headmaster of Haileybury on its re-opening as a public school in 1862.

Butler was educated at Harrow School, and entered Trinity College, Cambridge in 1838. He transferred to Exeter College, Oxford in 1840, where he was Hertford Scholar in 1841, and graduated with a first-class degree in classics, B.A. 1845, M.A. 1846.

== Career ==
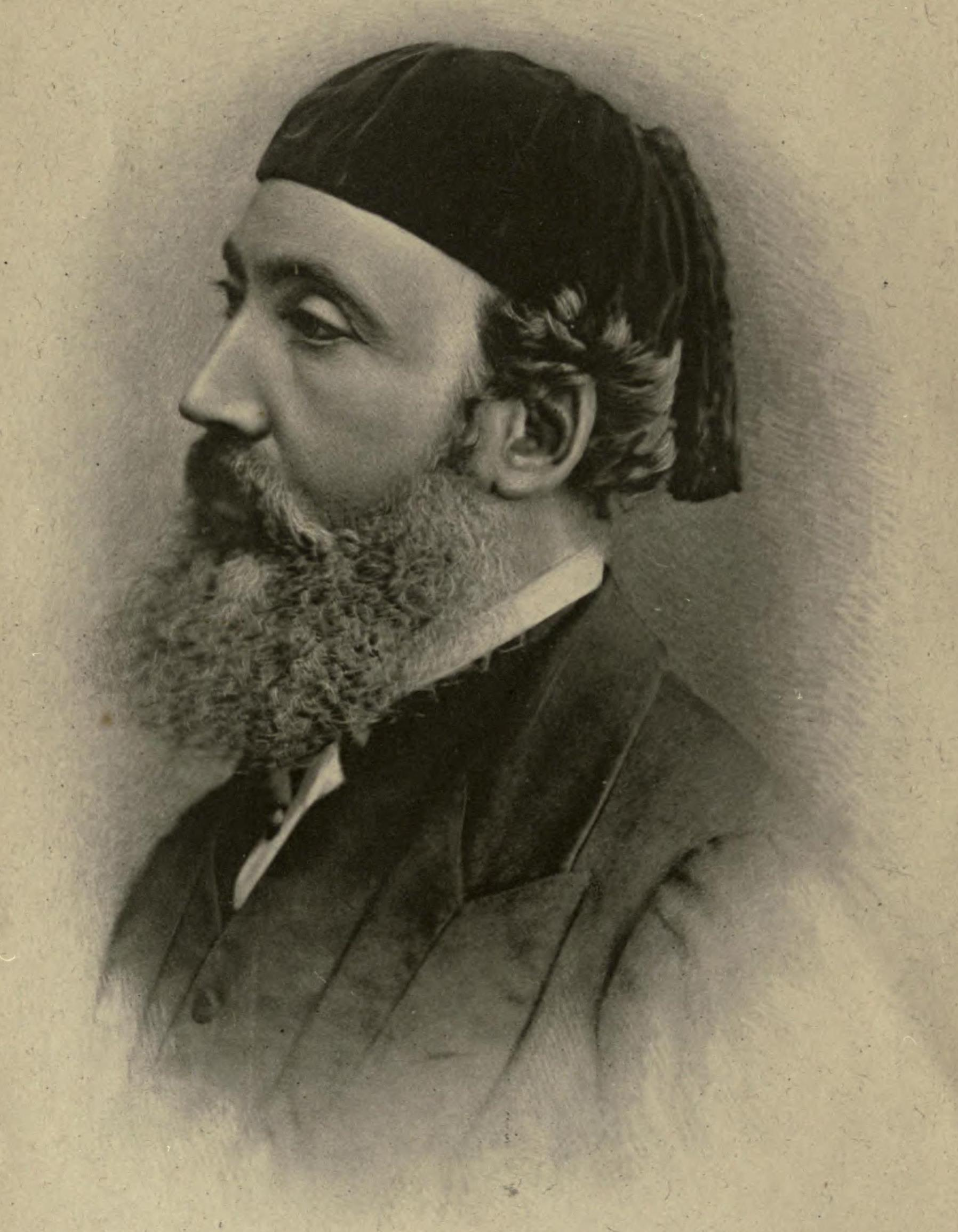
Butler, date unknown

In 1842 Butler became a Fellow of Exeter College, Oxford. He was appointed a professor at Durham University in 1848, returning to Oxford as a lecturer in 1850. He was Master of Butler's Hall, a private hall of the University of Oxford from 1855 to 1858. Later he was a housemaster at Cheltenham College, and he became Principal of Liverpool College in 1865. Liverpool College's academic performance improved, with six open scholarships to Oxford and Cambridge by 1869. On 28 January 1870 it was announced that "a Liverpool boy had for the first time won the most coveted award at Cambridge or any other University" – this was Richard Pendlebury, Senior Wrangler in 1870.

In 1882, Butler retired from Liverpool College, when appointed a canon of Winchester Cathedral. Butler died in London on 14 March 1890, and was buried in the cemetery at Winchester.

== Personal life ==
He was married to Josephine Butler, the social reformer. She outlived him, and published in 1892 Recollections of George Butler.

They had four children:

- George Grey Butler (1852–1935), barrister and civil service examiner
- Arthur Stanley Butler (1854–1923), professor of natural philosophy at the University of St Andrews
- Charles Augustine Vaughan Butler (1857–1929), journalist and soldier
- Evangeline Mary (Eva) Butler (1859–1864), died after falling from a banister at the family home
