= Louisa Lee Schuyler =

American leader in charitable work

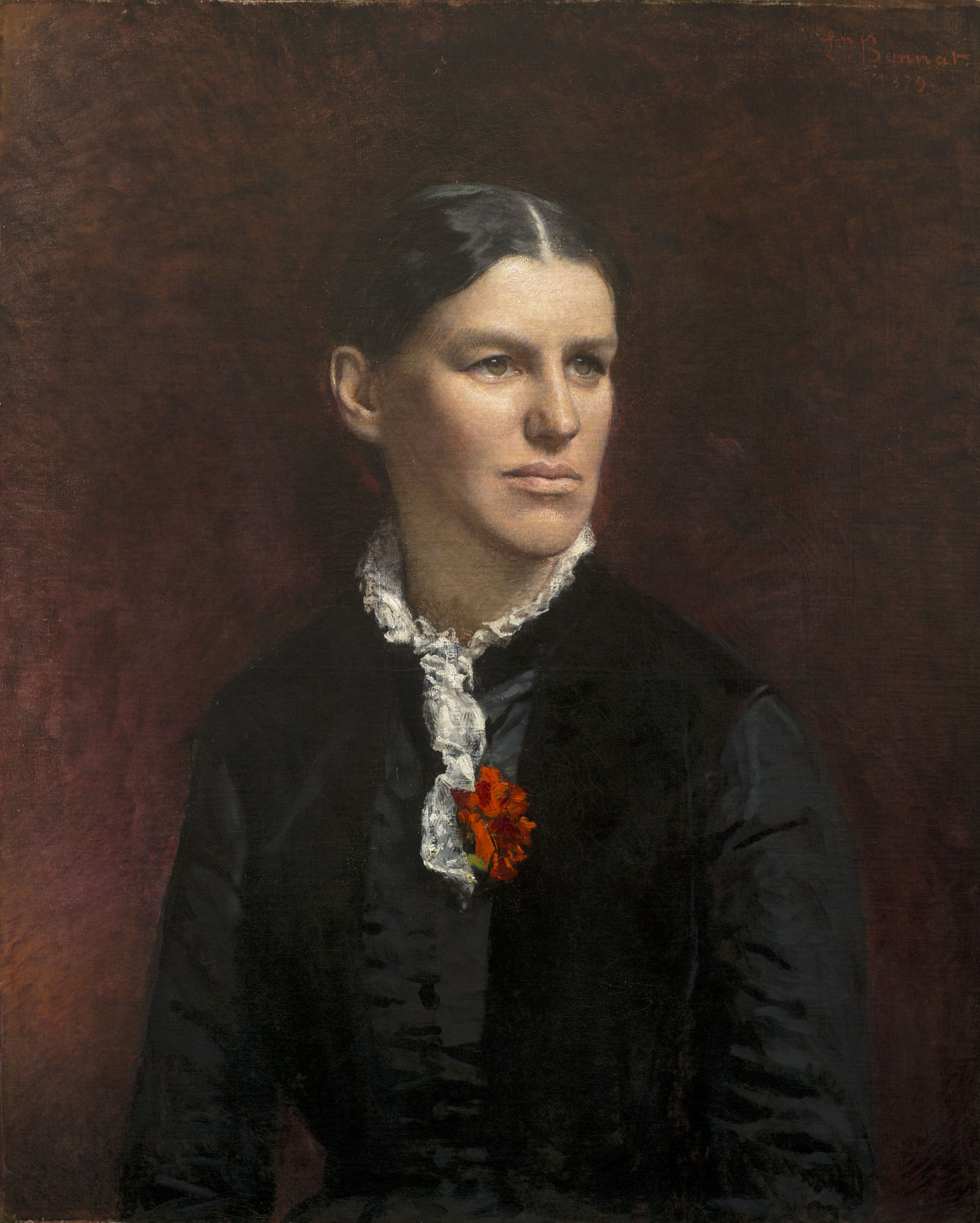
- Portrait by Léon Bonnat (1879)
- Born: October 26, 1837
- Died: October 10, 1926 (aged 88)
- Known for: Founding the first nursing school in the United States

Louisa Lee Schuyler (October 26, 1837 – October 10, 1926) was an early American leader in charitable work, particularly noted for founding the first nursing school in the United States.

== Charitable work ==
During the Civil War, at the relatively young age of 24, Schuyler was appointed as the corresponding secretary in the Woman's Central Association of Relief (WCAR) in New York City. The mission of WCAR was to coordinate the efforts of the volunteers on the home front, including distribution of millions of dollars of supplies, and providing training materials.

In 1872, she organized the New York State Charities Aid Association. Frederick Law Olmsted suggested the organization's name. Schuyler served as one of its early presidents. Joseph Hodges Choate and George Folger Canfield were subsequent presidents.

In 1873, through the SCAA, she helped establish the first training school for nurses in the United States, Bellevue Training School of Nursing, in connection with Bellevue Hospital. She also worked on projects to address tuberculosis and blindness. In 1907 she was appointed one of the original trustees of the Russell Sage Foundation, founded by Margaret Olivia Slocum Sage.

== Recognition ==
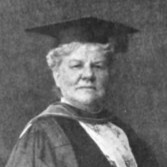
Schuyler receiving honorary LLB at Columbia University

In recognition of her 40 years of activity in charitable work, she received in 1915 the honorary degree of Doctor of Laws from Columbia University, where former SCAA president Canfield was a professor of law. In 2000, the State Charities Aid Association was renamed the Schuyler Center for Analysis and Advocacy in her honor.

== Family and personal life ==
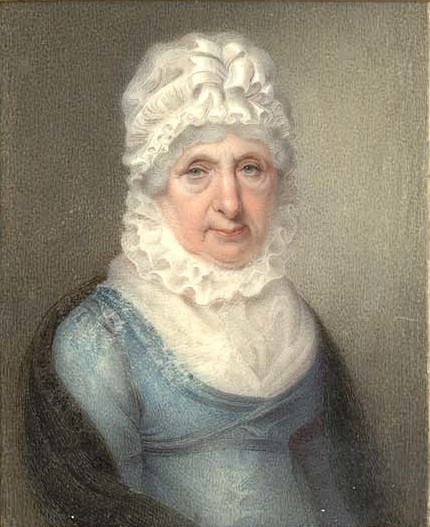
Catherine Van Rensselaer

Schuyler was the great-great-granddaughter of Gen. Philip Schuyler, a hero of the American Revolution, her mother, Eliza Hamilton Schuyler was the granddaughter of Alexander Hamilton, , the first U.S. Secretary of the Treasury, She was the granddaughter of James Alexander Hamilton. Louisa, along with her older brother and younger sister Georgina, grew up in Dobbs Ferry on the banks of the Hudson River. She was educated by private tutors. From the 1850s onwards, her parents were involved with the Children's Aid Society of New York; following their example, Louisa Lee Schuyler worked at an industrial school, teaching sewing to the children of immigrants.

Schuyler never married, living with her sister Georgina for most of her adult life. She died shortly before her 89th birthday.

== Related articles ==
- Josephine Shaw Lowell
- Octavia Hill
- Josephine Butler
- Florence Nightingale
- Eleanor Rathbone
