= Barbara Caine =

Australian feminist historian

- Born: 2 April 1948; South Africa
- Education: University of Sydney; Monash University
- Occupations: Historian, professor
- Employer: University of Sydney
- Known for: Women History

Barbara Caine AM is an Australian feminist historian.

== Biography ==
She was born in Johannesburg, South Africa, then her family settled in Australia in 1960. Since 2015 she has been the Head of the School of Philosophical and Historical Inquiry at the University of Sydney. She has written extensively on British and Australian women's history, and has written biographies of a number of historical figures, including the Strachey family and the Webb family.

Caine researches and writes in the fields of nineteenth-century studies, women's history and biography and life-writing. She is an elected Fellow of the Australian Academy of the Humanities, the Academy of the Social Sciences in Australia, and the British Royal Historical Society.

Caine established the first Women's Studies Centre in Australia at the University of Sydney, and oversaw its development into a Department of Women's Studies.

== Awards and honours ==
In 2014, Caine became a member of the Order of Australia "for significant service to tertiary education, particularly gender studies, and as a role model and mentor".

== Bibliography ==
=== Books ===
- Victorian Feminists, 1992, Oxford University Press
- Destined to be wives: the sisters of Beatrice Webb, 1996, Clarendon Press
- English Feminism 1780-1980, 1997, Oxford University Press
- Gendering European History: 1780-1920 (with Glenda Sluga), 2000, Leicester University Press
- Bombay to Bloomsbury: a Biography of the Strachey family, 2005, Oxford University Press
- Biography and History, 2010, Palgrave Macmillan UK

=== Edited books ===
- Crossing Boundaries: Feminism and the Critique of Knowledges (with Marie de Lepervanche), 1988, Allen and Unwin
- Transitions: new Australian feminisms (with Rosemary Pringle), 1995, Allen and Unwin
- Australian Feminism: a Companion (with Moira Gatens, Emma Grahame, Jan Larbalestier, Sophie Watson, Elizabeth Webby), 1999, Oxford University Press
- Companion to Women's Historical Writing (with Mary Spongberg and Ann Curthoys), 2005, Palgrave Macmillan
- Friendship: A History, 2009, Equinox Publishing Ltd
