= Schuyler Center for Analysis and Advocacy =

New York charitable and advocacy organization

The Schuyler Center for Analysis and Advocacy (originally the State Charities Aid Association) is a New York nonprofit organization.

The organization was founded in 1872 by Louisa Lee Schuyler. Its mission was to encourage philanthropists to assist charities in the state of New York. It was a private charity that worked with the New York's State Board of Charities and the Charity Organization Society of the City of New York. The Association aimed to improve care of the poor in New York and to address related abuses. In 1881, the association was given the right to inspect state facilities. It campaigned for law reform, to stop the spread of tuberculosis, and for building new hospitals.

In December 2000, the organization changed its name to the Schuyler Center for Analysis and Advocacy. It continues to advocate for government policies in relation to health, welfare, and human services in New York.

Since 2018, Schuyler Center has published the annual State of New York's Children Data Book, which shares state and county-level data in the areas of child care, child poverty, food insecurity, child health, oral health, and child welfare.

Schuyler Center advocates for policy addressing child poverty and its related hardships. It spearheaded the New York State Child Poverty Reduction Act in 2021 and its implementation. It supports a state child tax credit, universal child care in the state budget, a family-centered child welfare system, and state investments that support child and family wellbeing.

Schuyler Center's policy experts have served on several state advisory boards, including the Child Poverty Reduction Advisory Council, the Child Care Availability Task Force, and the Medicaid Evidence Based Benefit Review Advisory Committee.

== History ==
Louisa Lee Schuyler began her organizing work when she was 23. As the Civil War began in April 1861, her father, George Lee Schuyler, co-organized the Union Defense Committee to provide emergency funds for the war effort. Two thousand women volunteered for the new Women's Central Association of Relief to coordinate relief efforts; as a result, in June 1861 President Lincoln approved the civilian U.S. Sanitary Commission to provide some oversight (its leadership included Frederick Law Olmsted as executive secretary), while WCAR continued as an independent auxiliary. Louisa Lee Schuyler became WCAR's leader, chairing publicity and reaching out to volunteers in multiple cities. Other WCAR leaders were Julia Kean (wife of Hamilton Fish), Gertrude Stevens (daughter of banker John Austin Stevens, a president of the National Bank of Commerce in New York, a predecessor of J.P. Morgan & Co.), and Mary Morris Hamilton (Schuyler's aunt).

Schuyler founded the State Charities Aid Association on 11 May 1872. The name, suggested by Frederick Law Olmsted at the first organizational meeting in Schuyler's family home in Manhattan, reflected the mission of encouraging philanthropists to assist charities in the state of New York. As a private charity, the Association was distinct from New York's State Board of Charities, which founded the Charity Organization Society of the City of New York. Nonetheless, these organizations did work together.

Three years after the founding, Gertrude Stevens Rice (now also known as Mrs. William Bordman Rice) joined the organization and remained involved for 51 years until her death.

By 1887, there were branches of the Association in most New York counties, with headquarters in New York City. The organization inspected state facilities, sometimes upsetting the heads of the facilities when they uncovered issues. Reflecting on two decades of advocacy, Schuyler wrote in 1893 that "what has been accomplished is equally due to the co-operation of the local authorities. ... the co-operation of the State Board of Charities and the State Commission in Lunacy have been invaluable. At times the association has been obliged to carry its reforms single-handed, but these instances are fortunately rare."

In the late 1800s and early 1900s, the Association was known for its work in relation to tuberculosis. It educated the public about tuberculosis at county fairs and public meetings. In 1911, it wrote to 500 wealthy citizens and anti-tuberculosis committees to raise awareness of its activities. In 1916, it collaborated with the Red Cross and the National Association for the Study and Prevention of Tuberculosis in a Red Cross Seal campaign. During the campaign more than 11 million Red Cross seals and the regional cities were challenge the city of Troy, the perennial winner, however, the city's resident were spurred on by the challenge to by even more seals.

In May 1922, the Association celebrated its 50-year anniversary.

In 2022, the organization celebrated its 150th anniversary.

== Leadership ==
Nineteenth-century presidents of the board included Schuyler and Joseph Hodges Choate. George Folger Canfield became president of the board in 1899.

Future U.S. president Theodore Roosevelt was an early board member, as were Theodore William Dwight, Frederick Law Olmsted, Charles Loring Brace, William Cullen Bryant, Grace Dodge, Joseph Hodges Choate, Josephine Shaw Lowell, Gertrude Stevens Rice, and Julia Kean (wife of Hamilton Fish).

In 1915, recognizing Schuyler's 40 years of charitable work, Columbia University bestowed upon her an honorary Doctor of Laws degree. The SCAA had multiple connections to Columbia Law, as Canfield was at the time a law professor there; Roosevelt had attended the law school without graduating and had similarly been given an honorary LL.D. in 1899; and Dwight, who had died in 1892, had founded the law school in 1858.

Kate Breslin has served as Schuyler Center's President and CEO since August 2010.

== Early Work ==
Early on, the Association sought to end one New York county's "remnant of the barbarous system of farming out the care of the poor to the lowest bidder," as Schuyler wrote. "The abuses connected with this practice can well be imagined. Through the exertions of our visiting committee, this system was speedily and completely abolished." The change was made in 1875. That same year, the state legislature passed the Children's Law, which protected children from being institutionalized in state-run poorhouses.

In 1881, the Right of Entrance Law gave SCAA the right to inspect state facilities. In 1890, New York's State Care Act assigned responsibility to the state for caring for poor people with mental illness; the SCAA had encouraged this. In 1909, the Insanity Law was consolidated in chapter 27 of the Consolidated Laws of New York. In 1907, the Association began campaigning to stop the spread of tuberculosis. In 1908, the Association wrote recommendations for building new hospitals.

== Current ==
In the 1990s, the Association lobbied the state for an earned income tax credit, lowering taxes for the working poor. The Association also tried to lobby the state to increase the minimum wage, with less success.

In December 2000, the organization changed its name to the Schuyler Center for Analysis and Advocacy. In 2025, the funders listed on its website included Mother Cabrini Health Foundation, Robin Hood Foundation, and The New York Community Trust.

Schuyler Center is a trusted leader in advocating for policy solutions that address child poverty and its related hardships, including spearheading the New York State Child Poverty Reduction Act and its implementation, advocating for a robust state child tax credit, championing universal child care in the state budget, advocating for a family-centered child welfare system, and supporting state investments that support child and family wellbeing.

Since 2018, Schuyler Center has published the annual State of New York's Children Data Book, which shares state and county-level data in the areas of child care, child poverty, food insecurity, child health, oral health, and child welfare.

Schuyler Center's policy experts are frequently interviewed by state, local, and national media outlets for insights on policy related to child wellbeing.

Schuyler Center houses and leads several campaigns, including Medicaid Matters New York, the Empire State Campaign for Child Care, New York Can End Child Poverty, and the Child and Family Wellbeing Action Network.
