= Ruthwell railway station =

Former railway station in Scotland

Coordinates: 55.0124°N 3.4242°W

Ruthwell
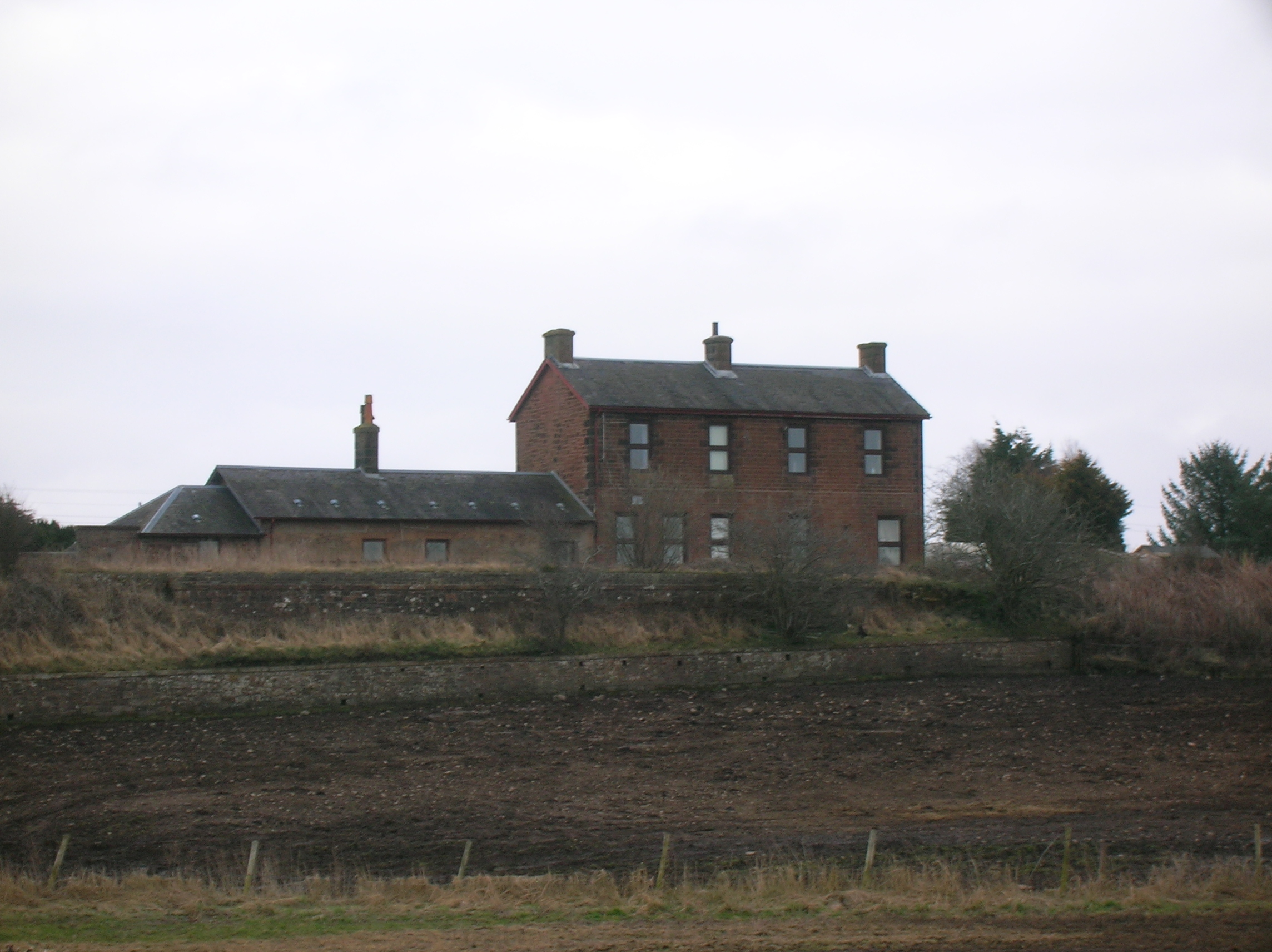
- Ruthwell station from the Clarencefield Road in 2010

General information
- Location: Ruthwell, Dumfries and Galloway; Scotland
- Platforms: 2

Other information
- Status: Disused

History
- Original company: Glasgow, Dumfries and Carlisle Railway
- Pre-grouping: Glasgow and South Western Railway
- Post-grouping: LMS

Key dates
- 23 August 1848: Opened
- 6 December 1965: Closed
- 6 April 1964: Closed to goods traffic
Location

Ruthwell railway station was a railway station in Dumfries and Galloway south of Dumfries, serving the village of Ruthwell with its famous 8th century carved cross; a rural community within the Parish of Ruthwell, lying a half-mile (1 km) north of Clarencefield and 1 1/4 miles (2.0 km) south southwest of Carrutherstown.

== History ==
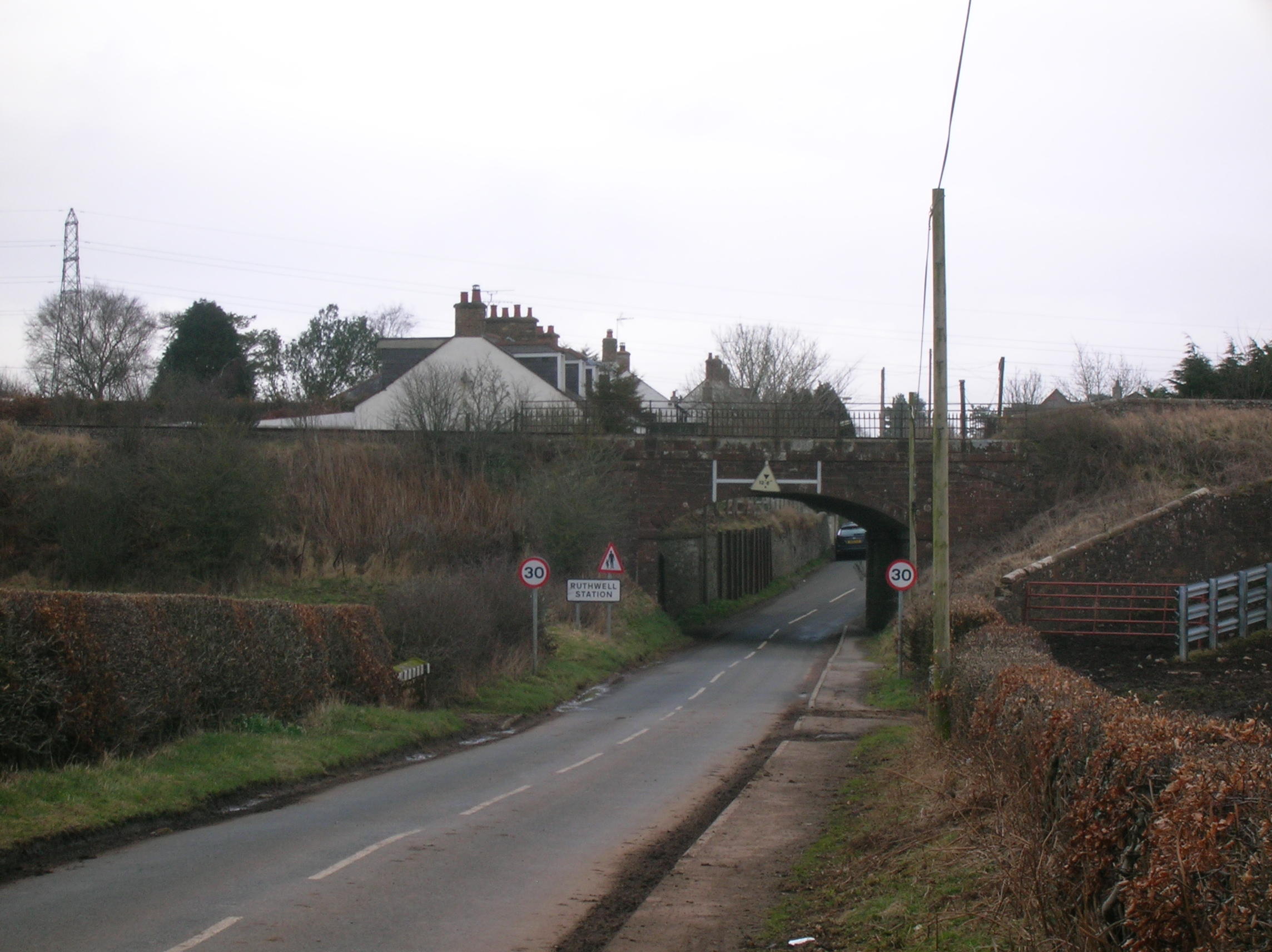
Ruthwell Station village and railway.

The station opened in 1848. The station is now closed, although the line running through the station remains open. The station building has been converted into a private dwelling.

Ruthwell was opened by the Glasgow, Dumfries and Carlisle Railway, which then became part of the Glasgow and South Western Railway; in 1923 it became part of the London Midland and Scottish Railway at the Grouping, passing on to the Scottish Region of British Railways following the 1948 nationalisation of the railways. It was closed by the British Railways Board. The station lay 90.9 miles south of Glasgow St Enoch.

George MacDonald was station master at Ruthwell before moving to Moniaive station in the mid-1900s.

The National Archives of Scotland hold a full collection of plans for the station of various dates.

A hamlet called 'Ruthwell Station' grew' up around the former station, previously known as Plans.

== Services ==
Preceding station	Historical railways	Following station
Racks; Line open; station closed	Glasgow and South Western Railway; Glasgow, Dumfries and Carlisle Railway	Cummertrees; Line open; station closed
