= Murray of Cockpool =

Minor branch of noble Scottish family

- Cadet branch
- Parent family: Clan Murray
- Country: Scotland
- Current region: Dumfries and Galloway
- Connected families: Earl of Annandale (1625 creation)
- Estates: Cockpool; Comlongon; Ruthwell

The Murrays of Cockpool were a minor noble Scottish family who were seated originally at Cockpool Castle, Dumfries and Galloway, Scotland. They moved to Comlongon Castle in the 15th century.

== History ==
The family descend from a William Murray in the reign of king Alexander III of Scotland. The lands of Cockpool, Comlongon, and Ruthwell were granted by their uncle Thomas Randolph, 1st Earl of Moray.

The sixth surviving son of Sir Charles Murray (d.1605) of Cockpool, James, rose to be Earl of Annandale in 1625. Cadets of the Cockpool family are the Murrays of Broughton in Kirkcudbright, Murrays of Drumcreiff and Murrays of Murraythwaite in Dumfries and Galloway.
