= Comlongon Castle =

Tower house in Scotland

Coordinates: 55°0′24.95″N 3°26′26.89″W

- Near Clarencefield, Dumfries and Galloway in Scotland
- The castle in 2016

Site information
- Type: Tower house, with baronial style mansion (c. 1900)

Location
- Height: 18 metres (59 ft) to the parapet

Site history
- Built: Later 15th or early 16th century
- Built by: Murrays of Cockpool
- Materials: Red sandstone

Comlongon Castle is a tower house dating from the later 15th century or early 16th century. It is located 1 kilometre (0.6 mi) west of the village of Clarencefield, and 10 kilometres (6.2 mi) south-east of Dumfries, in south west Scotland. The original tower has been extended by the addition of a baronial style mansion, completed around 1900.

Originally built by the Murrays of Cockpool, the castle remained in the Murray family until 1984. It was subsequently restored, having been vacant for some time, and the castle and mansion are now a hotel. In April 2019, the business side of Comlongon Castle went into administration, so all weddings and accommodation booked for after that date were cancelled, and the future of the castle was left uncertain.

== History ==
Thomas Randolph, 1st Earl of Moray, granted the lands of Comlongon, in the early 14th century, to his nephew William de Moravia, ancestor of the Murrays of Cockpool. Comlongon was built to replace the Murrays' earlier castle of Cockpool, of which only earthworks remain at Cockpool Farm, to the south-west of Comlongon.

The construction of Comlongon has been attributed to Cuthbert of Cockpool (died 1493) in the later part of the 15th century. However a licence to build was granted to his son John Murray (died c.1527) in around 1500, leading Alastair Maxwell-Irving to suggest it was built in the first decade of the 16th century. It was certainly present in 1508, when it is mentioned in documents creating the Barony of Cockpool for John Murray. Descendants of the Murrays were later created Viscounts Stormont in 1621, and Earls of Mansfield in 1776, and Comlongon was part of the Earl's estate until 1984.

An adjacent mansion was built in the 18th century, and was replaced with the present Baronial style house in 1900, designed by local architects John M. Bowie and James Barbour. From 1939 until 1952, the house served as a children's home operated by Barnardo's. After a spell of occasional use, it was sold by the Earl to Tony Ptolomey, who set about refurbishing both tower house and mansion as a hotel.

The hotel, operated by a partnership, was a popular wedding venue until April 2019, when the business entered administration after being assessed a payment of almost £40,000 the previous year to a former employee who was ruled to have been unfairly dismissed.

== The castle ==
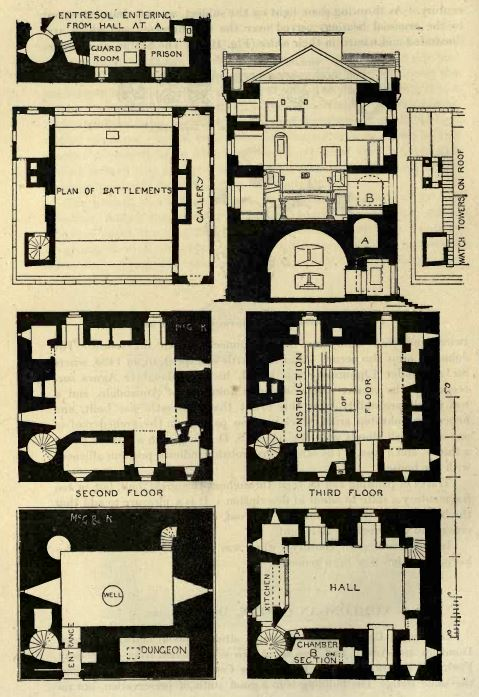
Floor plans and a section of Comlongon Castle, drawn by MacGibbon and Ross, 1887

The red sandstone tower is described as "exceptionally complete". It is approximately 15 by 13 metres (49 by 43 ft), and 18 metres (59 ft) high to the corbelled parapet. It was built on a stone plinth, to support the structure on what was a marshy site. The entrance to the tower still retains the original yett, an iron lattice gate, in front of the door. That leads through walls up to 4.1 metres (13 ft) thick into a vaulted cellar with a well, and two spiral stairs leading up. The main stair at the north-east corner leads up to a cap-house at parapet level, while the second serves the high-table end of the first floor hall.

The hall is dominated by a large fireplace, with the Royal Arms of Scotland carved above it. Next to the fireplace is an elaborately decorated aumbry (a ceremonial recess), with a carved cinquefoil surround that attests to the relative wealth of the Murrays. A separate fireplace at the opposite end of the hall would have served the narrow kitchen, and would have been separated from the hall by a timber screen where a wall now stands. Heraldic emblems are carved onto several projecting corbels.

Similarities in the design and layout of Comlongon's hall with that of Elphinstone Tower in Lothian, have led to suggestions that two further storeys lie above the hall, with parapet walks at roof level. The western parapet was roofed over before 1624, when a surviving inventory was taken, creating a gallery with crow-stepped gables. A similar structure was built over the south-east corner, giving the south facade a symmetrical appearance. The upper storeys were also subdivided before this time.

The thick walls are riddled with 12 mural chambers including bed recesses, as well as a guardroom with a cell beyond, and a trapdoor which gives access to a grim unlit dungeon below. The presence of those rooms within the walls reduces the overall strength of the tower, which has had to be reinforced to support the weight of its roof.

A walled courtyard and ditch, possibly a moat, once surrounded the tower, although it was removed in the early 18th century when the mansion house was added to the east side of the tower. The Scottish Baronial mansion reflects the style of the earlier tower, with many crowsteps and corbels, and incorporates 18th-century interior features. Comlongon Castle and the tower house are category A listed buildings.
