= Ruthwell =

Coordinates: 54.9934°N 3.4076°W

Ruthwell: Scottish Gaelic: Ruadhail; Scots: Rival
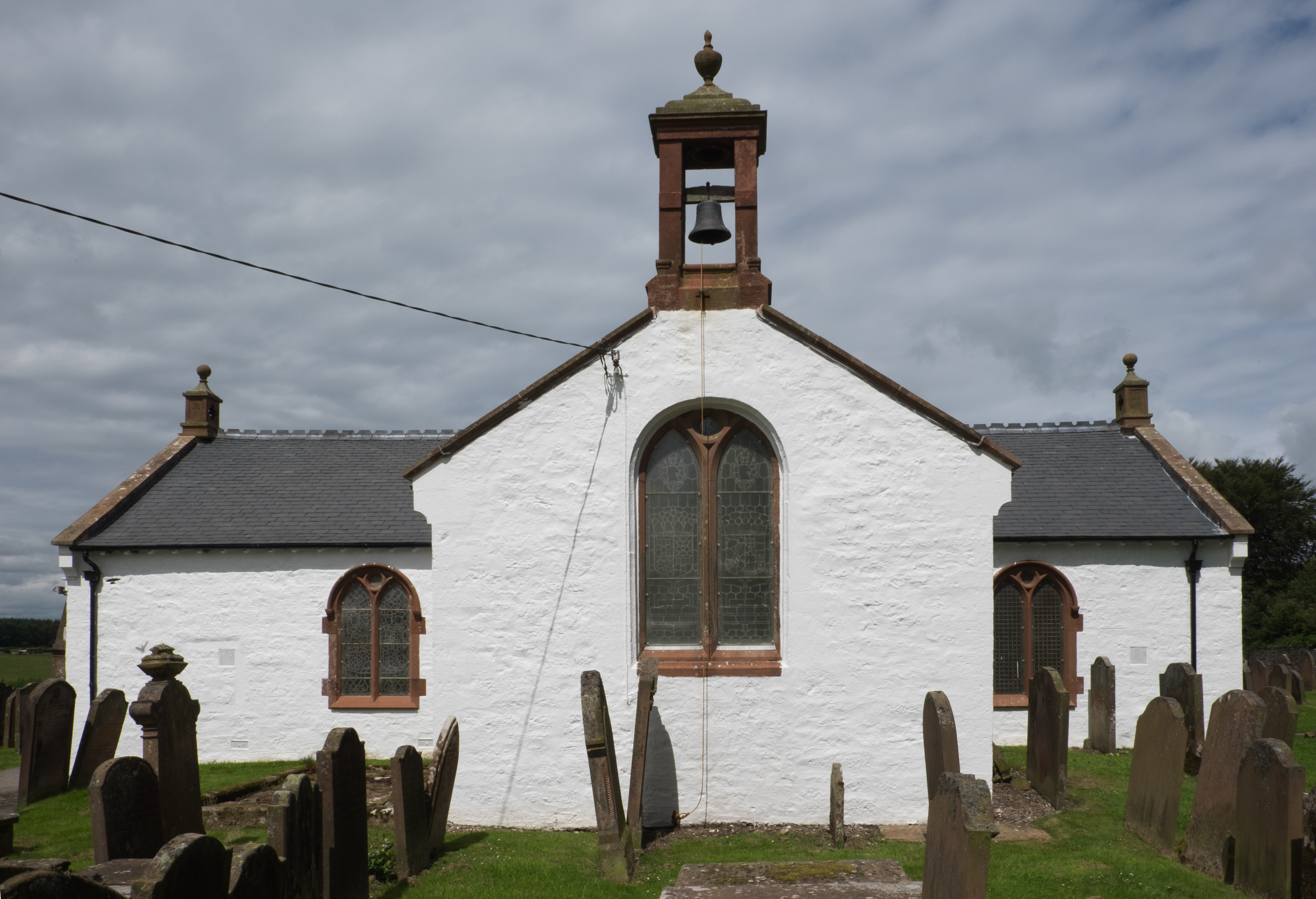
- Ruthwell Church

- Location within Dumfries and Galloway
- OS grid reference: NY099674
- Council area: Dumfries and Galloway
- Lieutenancy area: Dumfries
- Country: Scotland
- Sovereign state: United Kingdom
- Post town: DUMFRIES
- Postcode district: DG1
- Dialling code: 01387
- Police: Scotland
- Fire: Scottish
- Ambulance: Scottish
- UK Parliament: Dumfriesshire, Clydesdale and Tweeddale
- Scottish Parliament: Dumfriesshire

Ruthwell is a village and parish on the Solway Firth between Dumfries and Annan in Dumfries and Galloway, Scotland. In 2022 the combined population of Ruthwell and nearby Clarencefield was 400.

Thomas Randolph, Earl of Moray, gave Ruthwell to his nephew, Sir William Murray, confirmed to Sir John Murray, of Cockpool, in 1509 by King James VI. He was later given the title Earl of Annandale: their landownings in Ruthwell passed by inheritance to Lord Stormont in 1658, and after 1792 to the Earls of Mansfield.

Ruthwell's most famous inhabitant was the Rev. Henry Duncan. He was a minister, author, antiquarian, geologist, publisher, philanthropist, artist and businessman. In 1810 Dr Duncan opened the world's first commercial savings bank, Ruthwell Savings Bank, paying interest on its investors' modest savings. The Henry Duncan Savings Bank Museum tells the story of early home savings in Britain. The museum is on the site of the Ruthwell Savings Bank.

In 1818, Duncan restored the Ruthwell Cross, one of the finest Anglo-Saxon crosses in the United Kingdom, now in Ruthwell church, which had been broken up in the Scottish Reformation. This cross is remarkable for its sculpture and inscriptions in Latin and Old English, some in Anglo-Saxon runes, which include excerpts from The Dream of the Rood, an Old English poem. After the Disruption of 1843 in the Church of Scotland, Dr. Duncan became one of the founding ministers of the Free Church of Scotland.

During his youth, Robert Murray M'Cheyne spent summer holidays at Clarence Cottage in the hamlet of Clarencefield near Ruthwell, the home of his maternal aunt. During these visits he would often call to see "Uncle" Henry Duncan at the manse. M'Cheyne's parents were born in this part of Scotland.

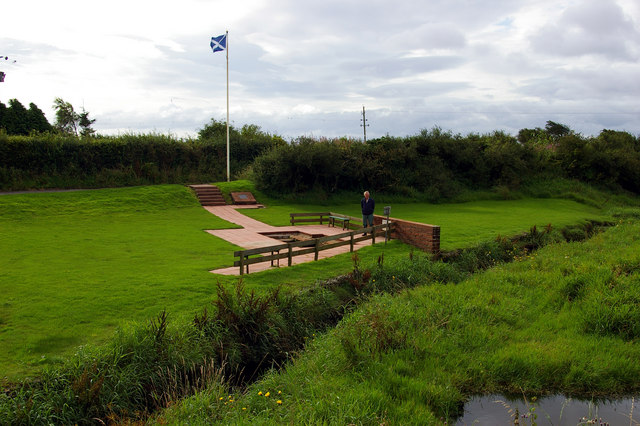
Brow Well

The Brow Well is situated 3 km west of the village of Ruthwell. This well, stained reddish by the high levels of iron salts in the water, is the place where Scottish poet Robert Burns hoped to cure his final illness by drinking the iron-rich water.

The village was once served by Ruthwell railway station.

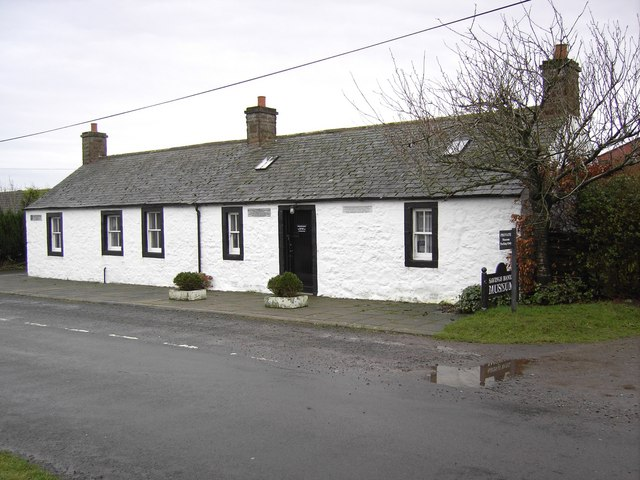
Henry Duncan Savings Bank Museum
