= Brow, Dumfries and Galloway =

Coordinates: 54.99376°N 3.43147°W

Brow: Scots: Brow
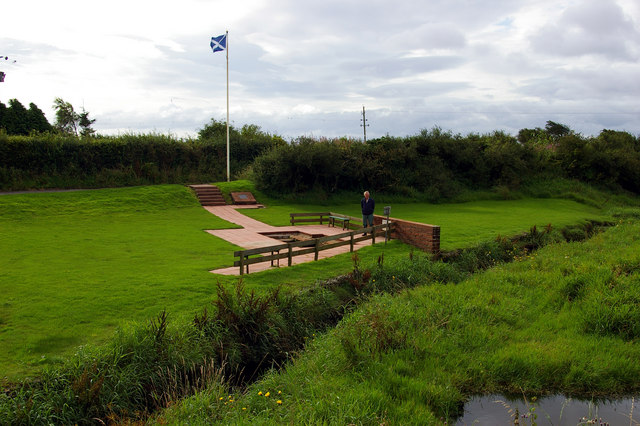
- The Brow Well

- Location within Dumfries and Galloway
- OS grid reference: NY085675
- Council area: Dumfries and Galloway
- Lieutenancy area: Dumfries
- Country: Scotland
- Sovereign state: United Kingdom
- Post town: DUMFRIES
- Postcode district: DG1
- Dialling code: 01387
- Police: Scotland
- Fire: Scottish
- Ambulance: Scottish
- UK Parliament: Dumfriesshire, Clydesdale and Tweeddale
- Scottish Parliament: Dumfriesshire

Brow is a hamlet on the B725 lying around 3 km from Ruthwell in the Parish of that name on the Solway Firth between Dumfries and Annan in Dumfries and Galloway, Scotland. The Raffles Burn runs through the site, marked on maps as the Brow Burn it flows into the Solway Firth at Lochar Bay.

== History ==
The name may refer to the situation of the site that 'faces or confronts' the Lochar Water and the Solway Firth. The hamlet in 1747 consisted of four or more buildings on a minor road between Ruthwell and Caerlaverock. A ford in the 1800s ran across the sands and the Lochar Water from near Brow to Blackshaw Point. The Raffles or Brow Burn runs through the site after passing near to Clarencefield where it once powered a saw mill and then through the Brow Plantation to run through the sand banks at Lochar Bay where at low tide it joins the Lochar Water.

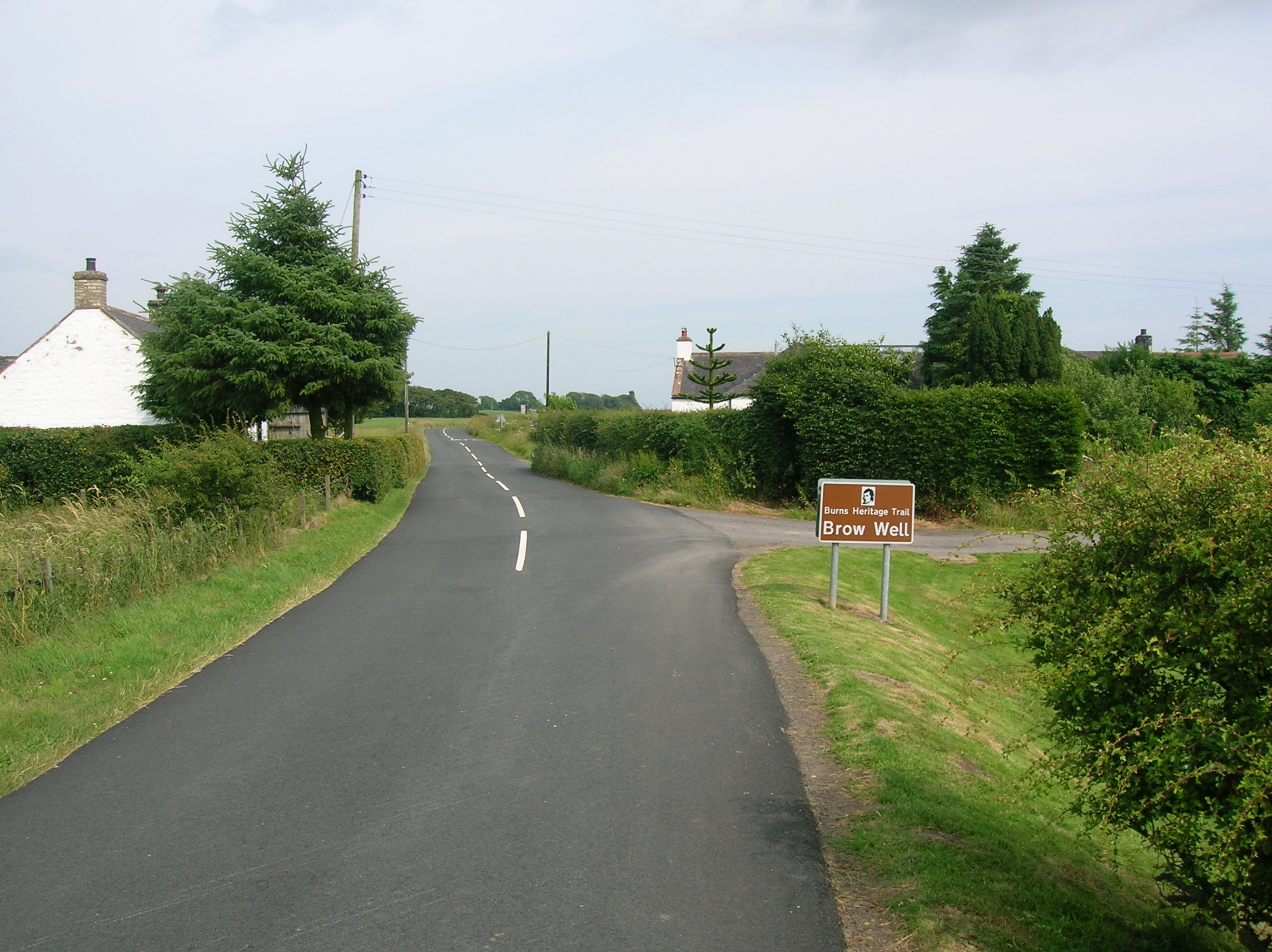
The Brow hamlet.

Used as a staging post by drovers taking their cattle to England for sale, the hamlet had at Burns' time around a dozen houses. One of which was small inn that although run by the Davidsons, husband and wife, was owned by James Morpeth and survived until 1863 when it was demolished. Brow had a minor reputation as a poor mans spa with its Chalybeate well and sea bathing in the Solway Firth a hundred metres or so away down a narrow lane. The farm of Stanhope is located on the other side of the burn with a ford existing in the 19th century.

Herman Molls map circa 1745 does not mark 'Brow' in this position, but locates a 'Brow' on the other side of the Lochar Water on Blackshaw Point as does Blaeu's map, based on Timothy Ponts map of circa 1600.

John Thomson's map of 1832 indicates a group of three buildings and a mineral well. In 1856 a group of buildings existed with a small building close to the well and a path leading down to a ford across the Brow Burn that led to Stanhope Farm.

The hamlet had a small cottage that acted as an inn of sorts, mainly used by drovers and those visiting the well seeking a cure. The inn, situated between two other cottages, lay on the eastern side of the Raffles or Brow Burn and was demolished in 1863 when the road was widened. Robert Burns stayed at this hostelry whilst taking the waters from Brow Well and immersing himself up to the armpits in the waters of the Solway Firth.

A local legend records that the Roman Legions of the Emperor Agricola landed at Brow. It is also said that the first Scottish pigs were introduced and raised at Brow, their appearance causing great concern amongst those who saw them.

On a knoll close to the cottage in which Robert Burns lodged David Lord Stormont of Comlongon Castle bade farewell to his younger son William Murray, informing him that he should not return until he achieved the position of Chief Justice of the King's Bench. In due course William did indeed reach this position in the justiciary.

The Brow Merse is a part of the Caerlaverock National Nature Reserve.

=== The Brow Well ===
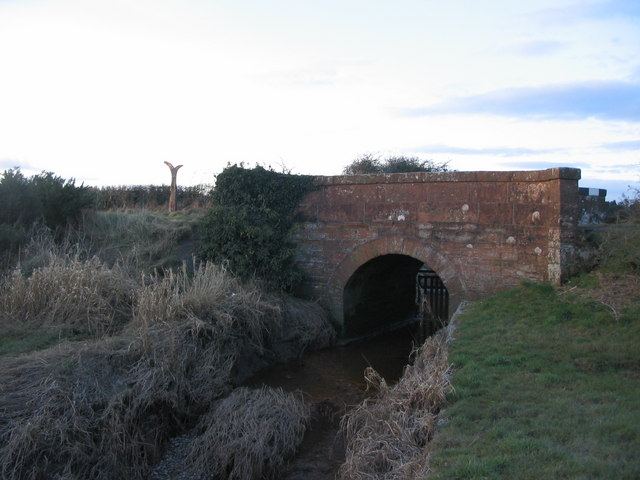
The Brow Bridge over the Raffles Burn.

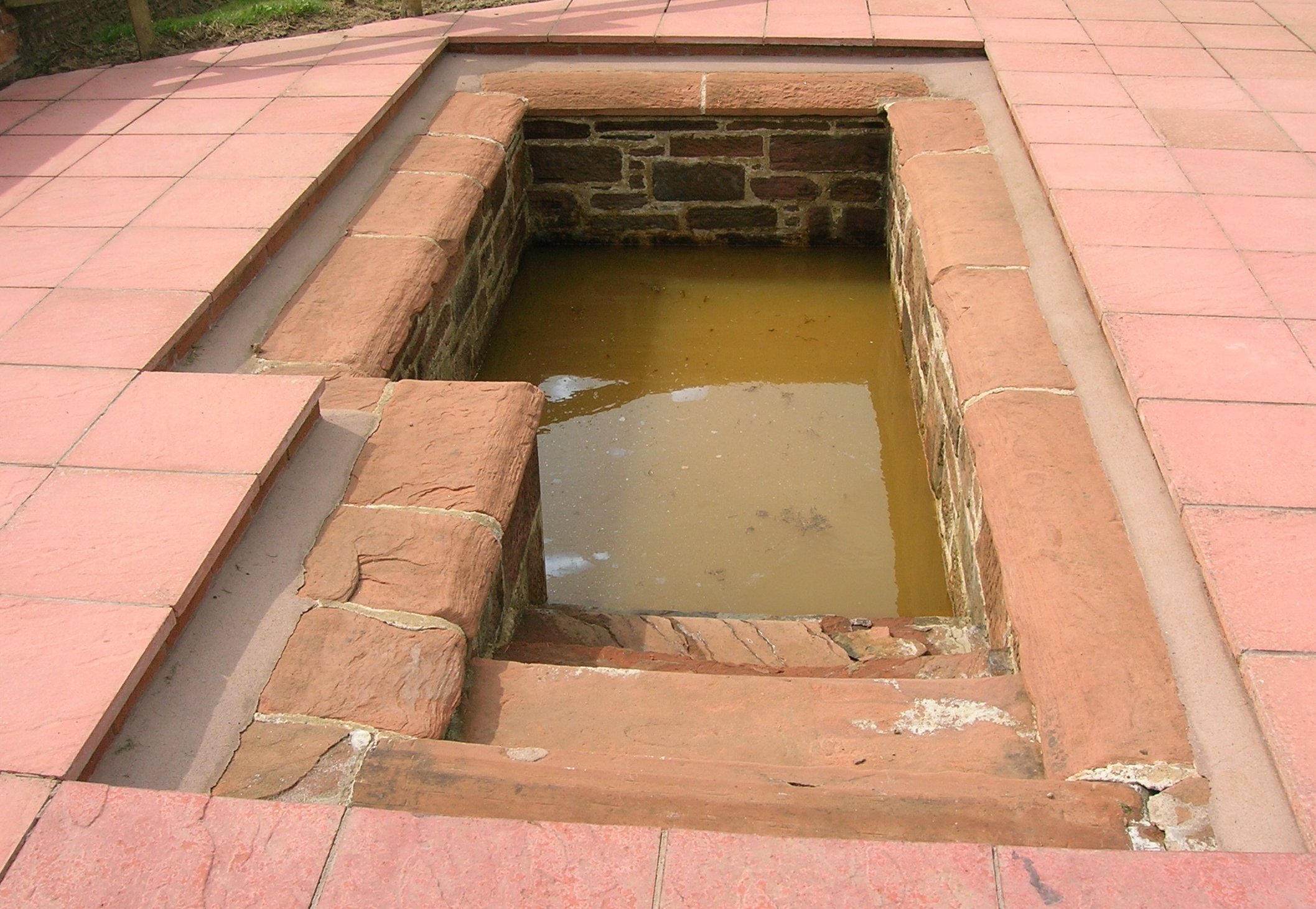
The Brow Well.

Constructed in its present form in the 20th century, the Grade C Listed well (NGR NY 308505, 567509) is a roughly L-shaped tank with ashlar red sandstone walls entered via stone steps. The iron-rich water was originally taken from a pipe using an iron cup attached to a chain. A drain takes the water to the nearby Raffles or Brow Burn.

This is a Chalybeate or ferruginous well that has become firmly established with a built environment surrounding it. The waters are rich in iron and other salts and were believed to have many properties beneficial to health. The map produced circa 1747 by William Roy appears to show three wells on the western side of the burn above the road and records 'Mineral Wells' plural at the site. John Ainslie's map of 1821 also shows the well located above the road and on the western side of the burn as does William Crawford's map of 1804.

An engraving of 1846 shows the thatched cottages of the hamlet and a rectangular well on the eastern side of the Raffles or Brow Burn. The 1856 OS map shows the well in its present and a small building nearby with a path leading to it. In 1898 the well is shown as rectangular and the small building nearby is not marked. The well is shown as draining into the burn.

The site of two other mineral springs are visible on the other side of the Raffles or Brow Burn at the Brow Well site however they have no built structures associated with them.

== Association with Robert Burns ==
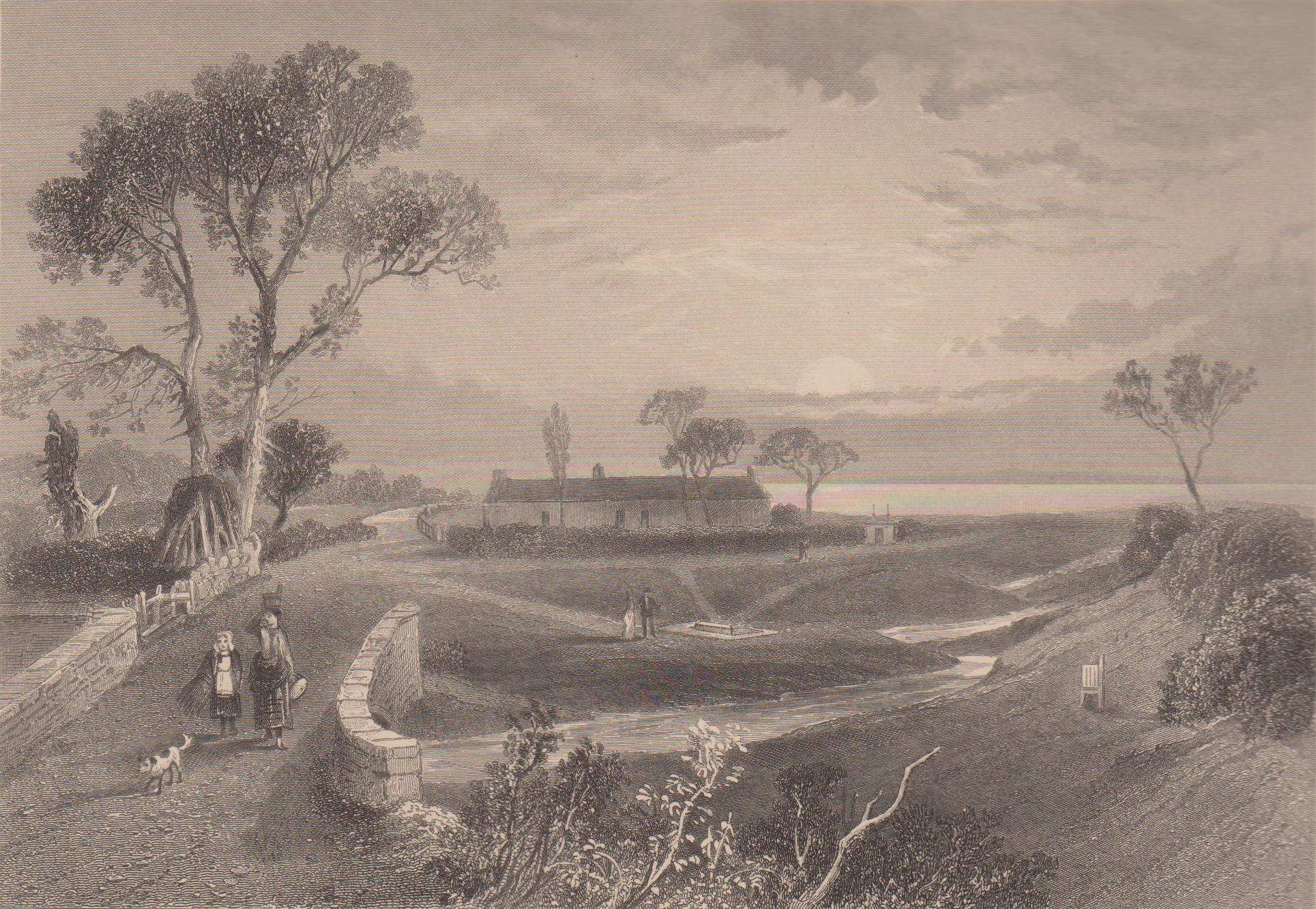
Brow and Brow Well circa 1800.

Probably suffering from subacute bacterial endocarditis (SBE), Robert Burns described his condition as 'Flying Gout' and his medical friends Dr William Maxwell and Dr Alexander Brown suggested that he should go to the Brow Well and try sea bathing, riding and the country air. It was suggested however by James Currie that the sea bathing treatment may have been Burns’ own idea, saying "About the latter end of June he was advised to go into the country, and impatient of medical advice, as well as of every species of control, he determined for himself to try the effects of bathing in the sea. For this purpose he took up his residence at Brow".

Arriving circa 3 July, he stayed for three weeks at the inn, lodging in the 'chamber end' of the inn. The inn did not serve port wine and as this had been prescribed as part of his treatment Burns was advised by Davidson to get some from his son-in-law who ran an inn at nearby Clarencefield. Locals used to point out the aged 'thorn' near the well under which he used to sit.

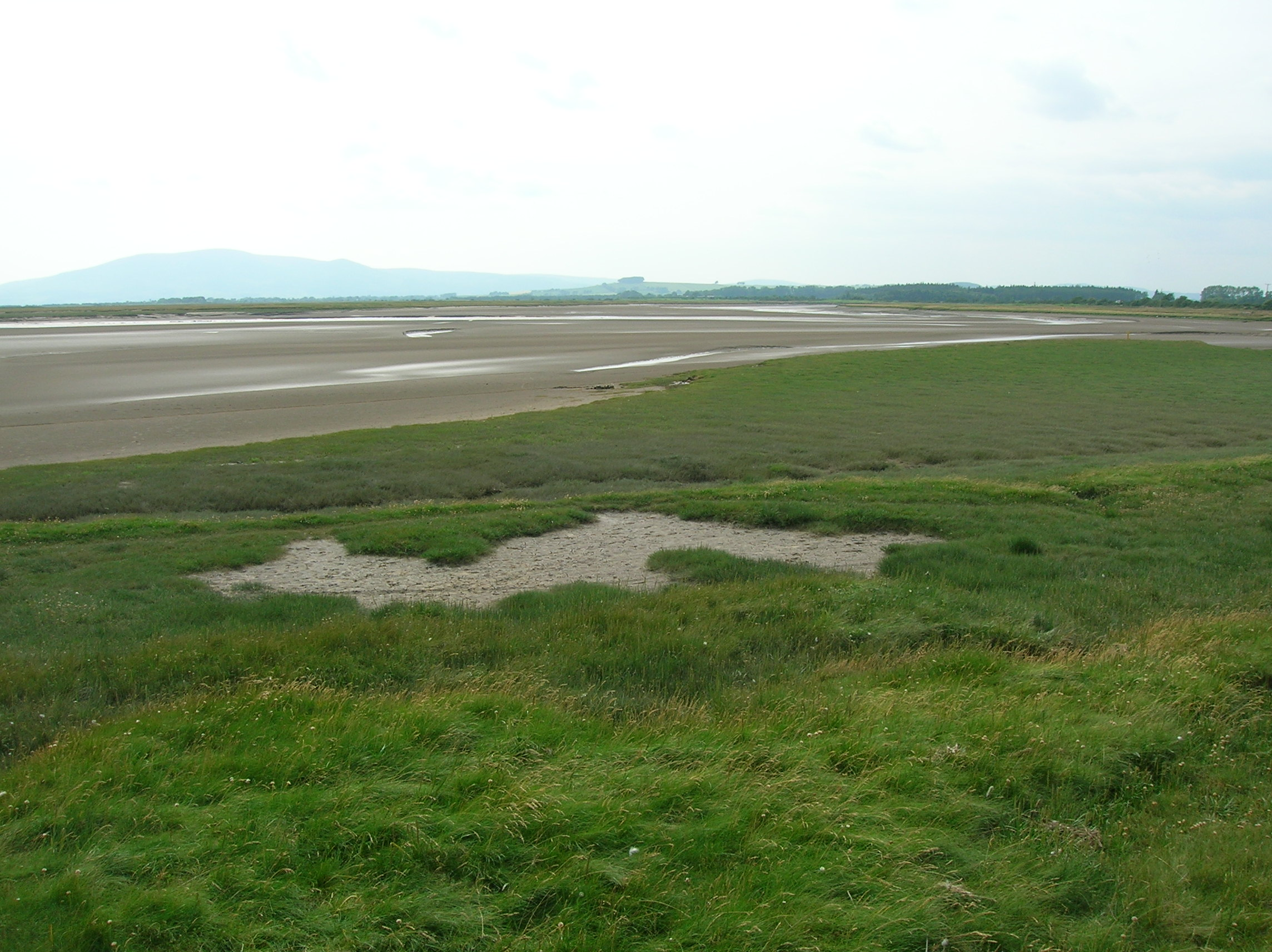
Lochar Bay where Robert Burns undertook sea bathing in the Solway.

Whilst at Brow he wrote several letters, including one on 12 July to George Thomson requesting £5 and one to James Burness in Montrose for £10. He also wrote on 7 July to Alexander Cunningham regarding his much reduced salary and to Frances Dunlop expressing his sorrow at her lack of forgiveness and saying farewell. He also wrote on 10 July two, his first and his last letters ever written by him to his father-in-law, seeking help for his wife in the final stages of her pregnancy from her mother Mrs Mary Armour. A letter to his wife was unsurprisingly positive given Jean's Armours advanced state of pregnancy. To his brother Gilbert he wrote hinting at money troubles and despairing of his health. Burns also stated that he intended to continue taking the treatment for the whole summer whilst "staying at a friend's house", presumably an offer made by Maria Riddell.

During this stay, on 5 July, Maria Riddell sent her carriage to collect him so that he could dine with her at Lochmaben. She recorded that he had the "stamp of death" on his face and was "touching the brink of eternity" and his greeting to her was "Well madam, have you any commands for the other world". Burns also visited Ruthwell Manse and had tea with the widow of the minister, Mrs. Craig. The lady's daughter, Agnes, later the wife of the famous Rev Henry Ducan, made to close a curtain to give some shade to Burns and his recorded response was "thank you, my dear, for your kind attention; but oh, let him shine! he will not shine long for me!".

Although he had a horse with him he was reluctant to face the rain and wrote to his friend John Clark at nearby Locharwoods Farm requesting the use of his spring-cart, a new innovation with a comfortable ride. Burns at first seemed invigorated, however by 18 July it was time for him to return to Dumfries as the sea bathing depended on the state of the tides and the spring tides had passed. He died at Dumfries on 21 July.

A twelve-year-old apprentice stonemason, Allan Cunningham, observed his return to his house and wrote that "The poet returned on the 18th July 1796 in a small spring-cart. The ascent to his house was steep, and the cart stopped at the foot of the Mill-hole Brae; when he alighted he shook much, and stood with difficulty; he seemed unable to stand upright. He stooped as if in pain, and walked tottering towards his door: his looks were hollow and ghastly, and those who saw him then expected never to see him again".

Every year the Southern Scottish Counties Burns Association organises a service at the Brow Well to commemorate the death of Robert Burns who died four days after his visit to the Brow Well on 21 July 1796.

== Archaeology ==
In 1969 a green-glazed globular jug dating from the 15th-16th century was discovered in a ditch that was being dug near the Brow Well. A number of years back a well made barbed and tanged flint arrow-head was discovered near the Brow Well and was later mounted as a brooch.

== See also ==
- Clarencefield
- Ruthwell
