= Nith Bridge cross =

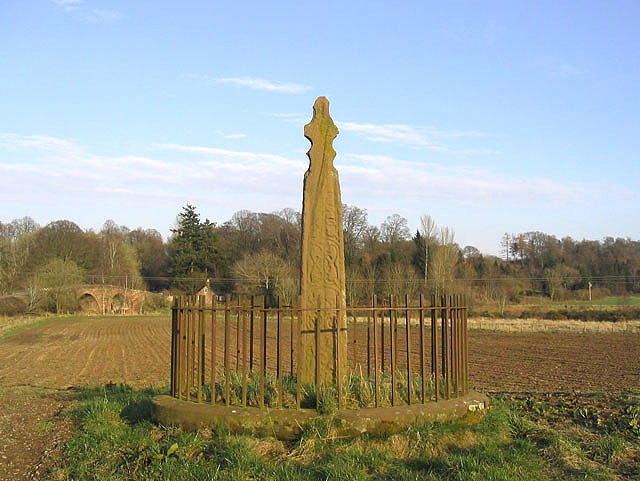

- Location within Dumfries and Galloway
- 55.240426°N 3.780457°W
- OS grid reference: NX 86890 95471

Scheduled monument
- Designated: 14/12/1936
- Reference no.: SM680

The Nith Bridge cross (also known as the Boatford cross) is a sculptured Anglo-Saxon cross, near the village of Thornhill, Dumfries and Galloway. It is the best preserved monument of its type in the region, after the Ruthwell Cross, although the arms are missing. It is a Scheduled monument. The cross is made of red sandstone and carved with animal and plant interlace designs in low relief. It is 6 feet 6 inches tall.
