= Cockpool Castle =

Former Scottish castle

Coordinates: 54.995456°N 3.455550°W

Cockpool Castle (Note: Also known as Cockpule Castle) was a castle, located at Cockpool farm, Dumfries and Galloway in Scotland.

Thomas Randolph, 1st Earl of Moray, granted the lands of Cockpool, in the early 14th century, to his brother-in-law William de Moravia, ancestor of the Murrays of Cockpool. The castle was abandoned in the mid 15th century after Comlongon Castle was built to replace the earlier castle of Cockpool. Only earthworks remain at Cockpool Farm, to the south west of Comlongon.
