= Clarencefield =

Village in Dumfries and Galloway, Scotland

Coordinates: 55.00311°N 3.42096°W

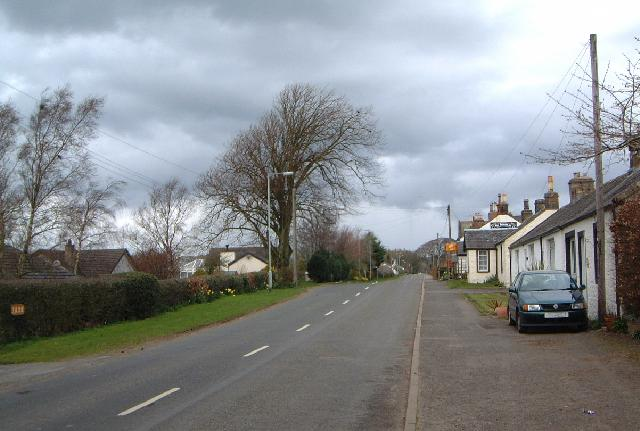
- Clarencefield mainstreet

- Location within Dumfries and Galloway
- OS grid reference: NY092685
- Council area: Dumfries and Galloway
- Lieutenancy area: Dumfries
- Country: Scotland
- Sovereign state: United Kingdom
- Post town: DUMFRIES
- Postcode district: DG1
- Dialling code: 01387
- Police: Scotland
- Fire: Scottish
- Ambulance: Scottish
- UK Parliament: Dumfriesshire, Clydesdale and Tweeddale
- Scottish Parliament: Dumfriesshire

Clarencefield is a small village in Ruthwell Parish between Dumfries and Annan in Dumfries and Galloway, Scotland. It was once served by Ruthwell railway station.

== History ==
This typical estate village was built to service nearby Comlongon Castle and to provide accommodation for its employees and their families. The castle was once held by the Earls of Mansfield and is now a hotel.

A saw mill was located nearby at Hope Cottages, powered via a mill pond using water from the Brow or Raffles Burn. The McFarlan Memorial Hall provides various facilities for the local community.

== Association with Robert Burns ==
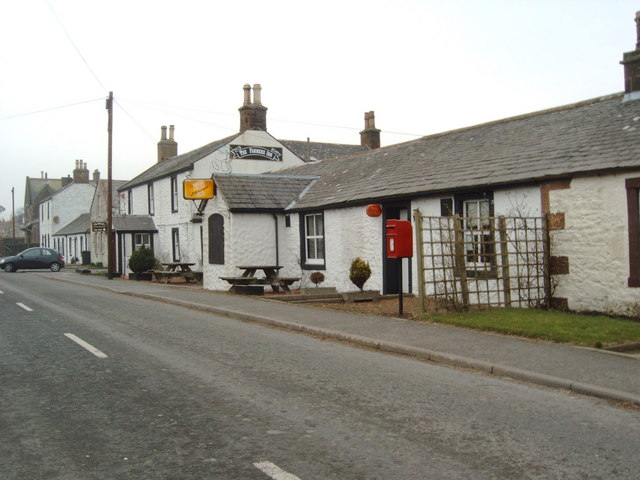
The Farmers Inn and the Post Office.

In July 1796, probably suffering from subacute bacterial endocarditis the poet Robert Burns's medical friends Dr William Maxwell and Dr Alexander Brown suggested that he should go to Brow where was prescribed drinking the water of the mineral well, sea bathing, riding and the country air. He stayed for three weeks, lodging in the inn. John Burney of the inn at Clarencefield was the son-in-law of the landlord at Brow and Burns was advised to make his way to the village to get some port wine that had been prescribed as part of his treatment.

Burns arrived, placed the empty bottle on the counter and ordered the port wine, however he had no money and made to give Burney his personal seal that carried his 'armorial device' that he was so proud of as security until he could pay with coin. He had informed the landlord that "the muckle deil had got into his pouch and was its only occupant". The landlady encouraged her husband to give Burns the medicinal wine without money or pledge. The inn is said to have been located in the farm on the route from Brow.

== See also ==
- Brow
- Ruthwell
- Ruthwell railway station
