= Racks railway station =

Former railway station in Scotland

Coordinates: 55.0540°N 03.5148°W

Racks
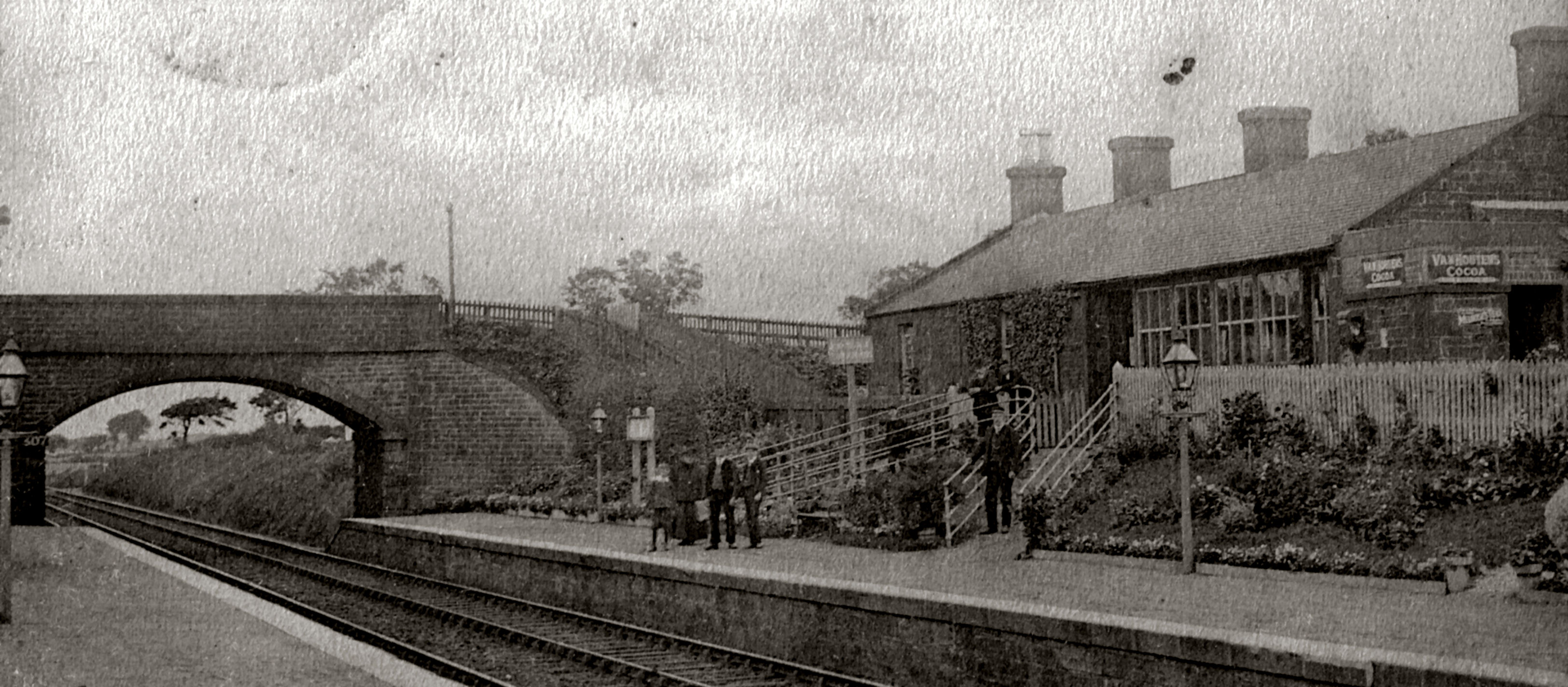
- Racks station in 1900

General information
- Location: Dumfries, Dumfries and Galloway; Scotland
- Platforms: 2

Other information
- Status: Disused

History
- Original company: Glasgow, Dumfries and Carlisle Railway
- Pre-grouping: Glasgow and South Western Railway
- Post-grouping: LMS

Key dates
- 23 August 1848: Opened
- 6 December 1965: Closed
- 6 May 1964: Closed to goods traffic
Location

Racks railway station was a railway station in Dumfries and Galloway, Scotland, south of Dumfries, OS NGR NY 033 743, serving and effectively creating the village of Racks near the Lochar Water, 4 miles ESE of Dumfries; a rural community within the Parish of Torthorwald.

== History ==
The station, 62.64 miles south of Glasgow Saint Enoch station, opened in July 1848. The station is now closed, although the line running through the station remains open. The station building has been converted into a private dwelling. The difference in height between the main building and platform level was overcome by the use of two fenced diagonal ramps built into the slope, with the remainder of the area occupied by a profusion of shrubbery and flower beds.

Racks station was opened by the Glasgow, Dumfries and Carlisle Railway, which then became part of the Glasgow and South Western Railway. In 1923, it became part of the London Midland and Scottish Railway at the Grouping, passing on to the Scottish Region of British Railways following the 1948 nationalisation of the railways. It had been a 'Wednesday Only' station since 1860 before becoming a fully open station on 2 January 1865. It was closed by the British Railways Board under the Beeching Axe in 1965.

== Services ==
| Preceding station | Historical railways | Following station |
|---|---|---|
| Dumfries; Line open; station open | Glasgow and South Western Railway; Glasgow, Dumfries and Carlisle Railway | Ruthwell; Line open; station closed |

== Views of Racks in 2010 ==
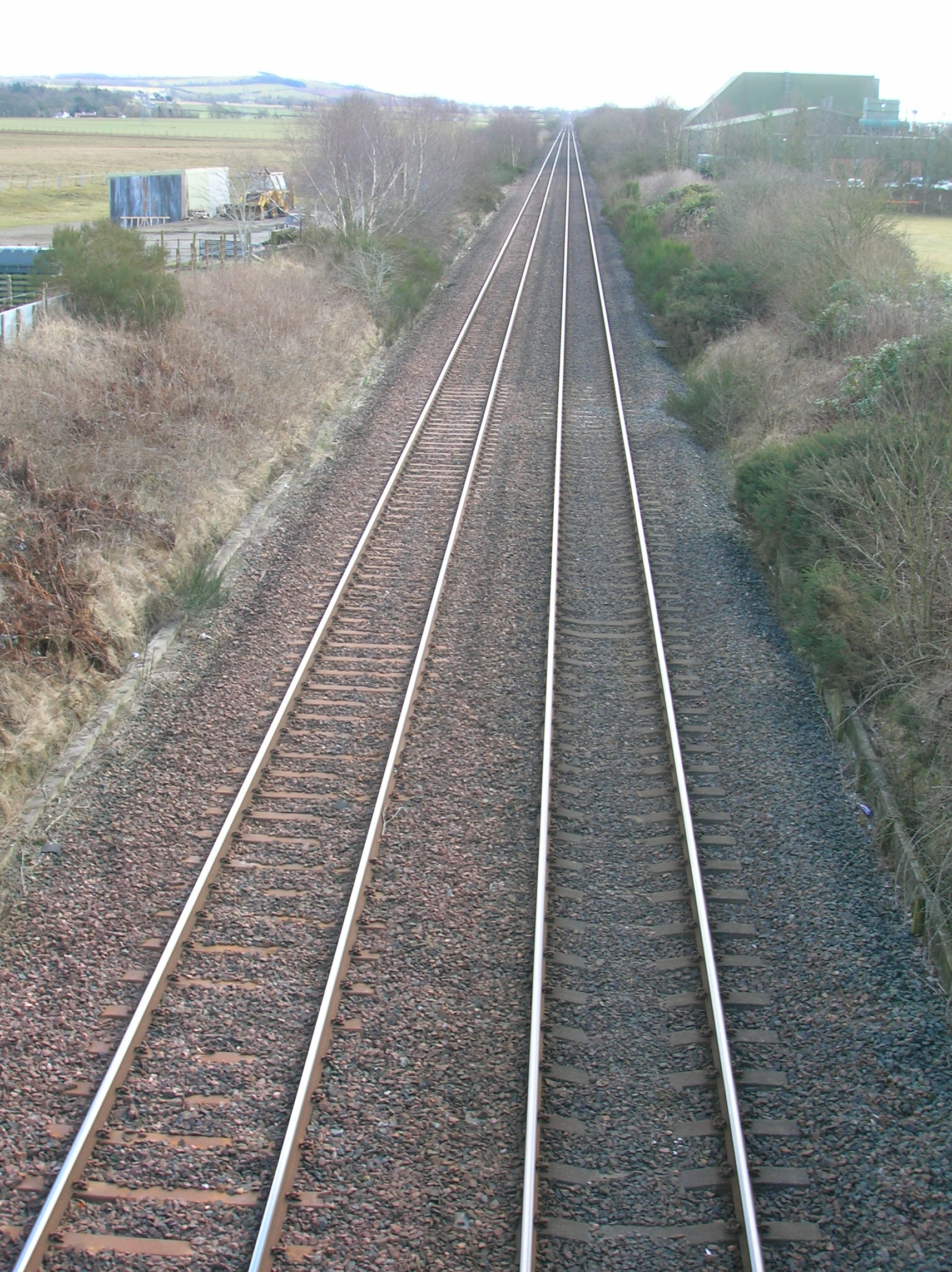
The site of the old station

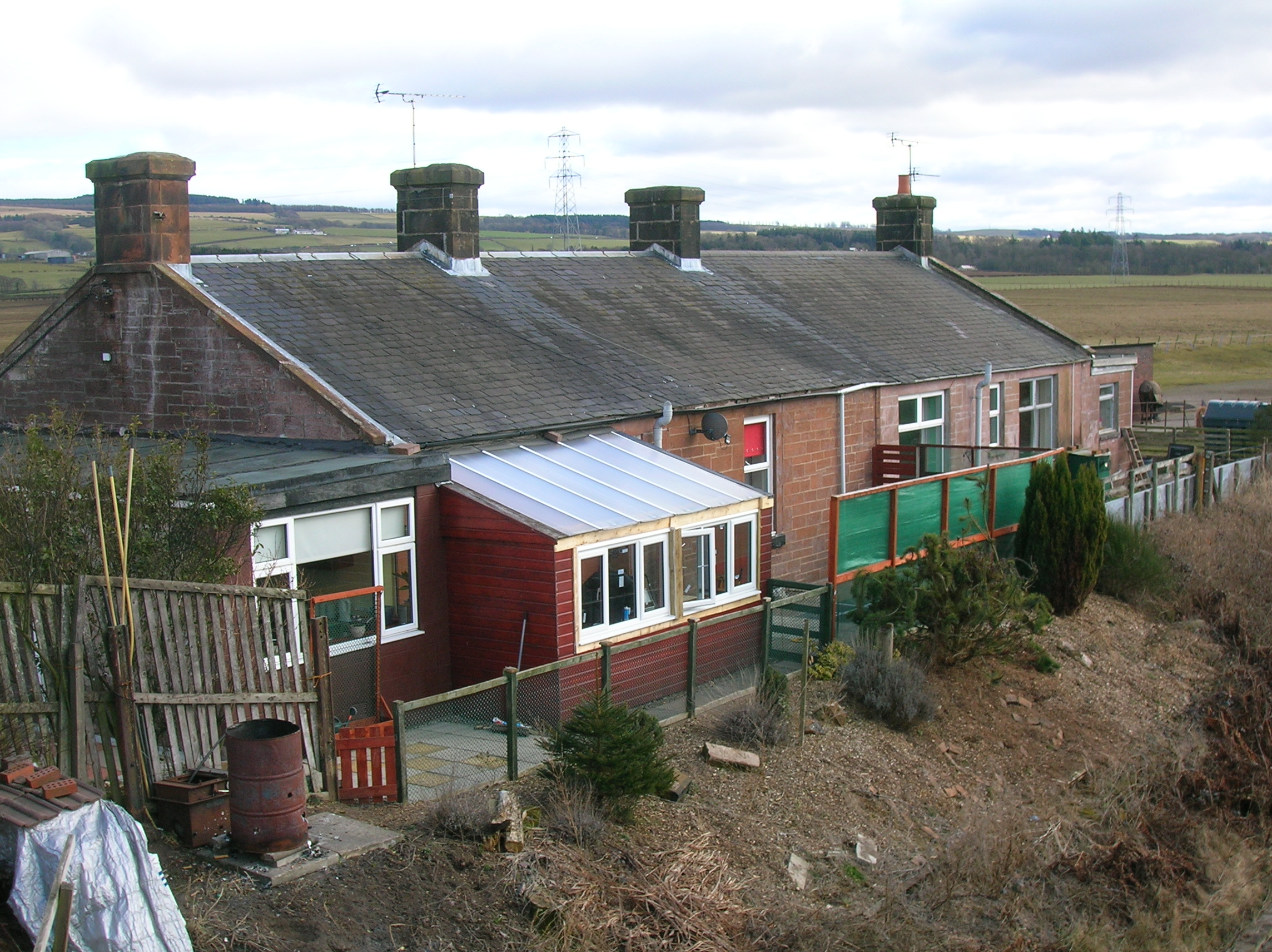
The old station buildings

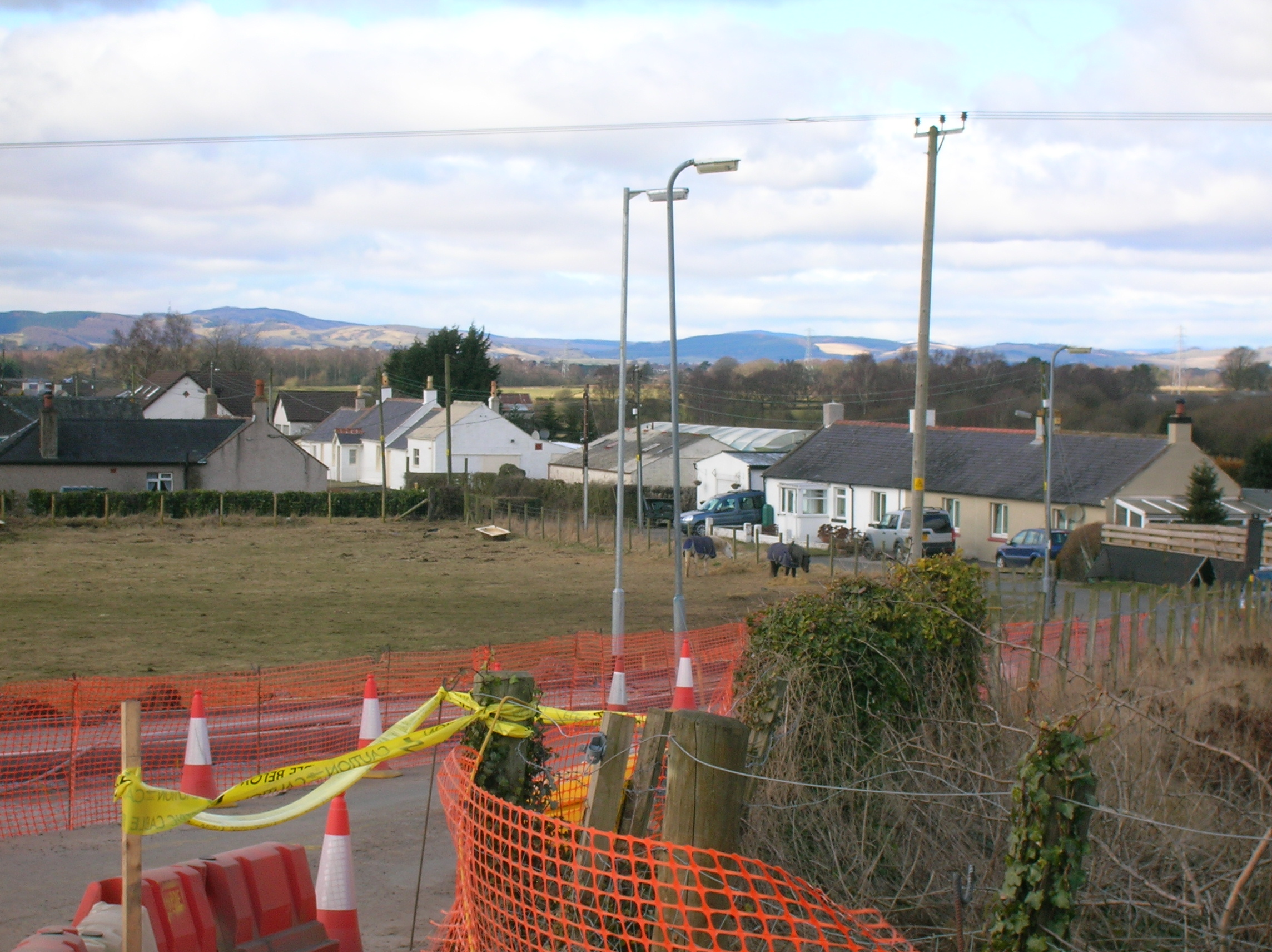
Racks village from the railway overbridge

== Sources ==
- Butt, R. V. J. (October 1995). The Directory of Railway Stations: details every public and private passenger station, halt, platform and stopping place, past and present (1st ed.). Sparkford: Patrick Stephens Ltd. ISBN 978-1-85260-508-7. OCLC 60251199. OL 11956311M.
