= Torthorwald =

Village in Dumfries and Galloway, Scotland

Coordinates: 55.089191°N 3.51447°W

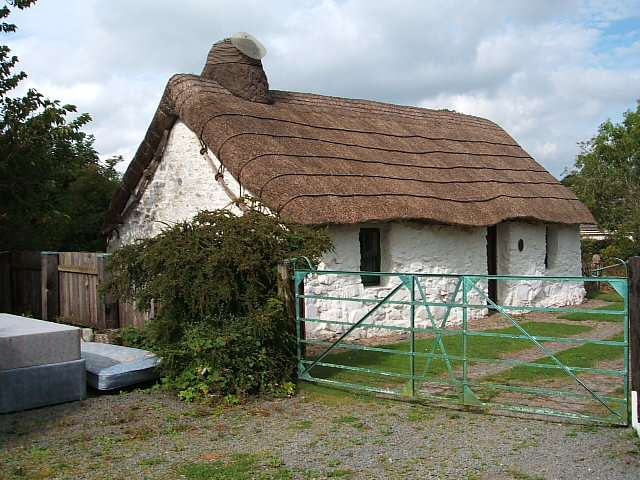
The Cruck Cottage at Torthorwald

Torthorwald is a village and civil parish in Dumfries and Galloway, south-west Scotland. It is located 6 kilometres (3.7 mi) east of Dumfries on the A709 road to Lochmaben. The area was the property of the de Torthorwald family until the end of the 13th century, when the estate passed by marriage to the Kirkpatricks. In 1418, William de Carleil married the Kirkpatrick heiress. He may have been the builder of Torthorwald Castle, which was erected around this time, possibly on top of an earlier a motte. Torthorwald was erected as a burgh of barony in 1473. Torthorwald Castle was occupied until 1715; only two of its walls still stand, to a height of around 18 metres (59 ft).

The pre-Reformation church at Torthorwald belonged to the Trinitarian Friars of Fail in Ayrshire. The present parish church was erected in 1782 on the site of this earlier foundation. Torthorwald is now within the united Parish of Kirkmichael, Tinwald and Torthorwald, which was created in 1981. The 19th-century missionary John Gibson Paton (1824–1907) grew up in Torthorwald. His evangelical work in the New Hebrides is commemorated in the church gate piers.

Another building of interest is a 19th-century cruck-framed and thatched cottage. Restored in the 1990s, the cottage is protected as a category A listed building, and is maintained by a local heritage association. The village has a hotel, a village hall, and formerly had a primary school which closed in 2010. An annual Scarecrow Fun Day involves villagers erecting scarecrows in their front gardens.

== Transport ==
There is a frequent bus service to Dumfries which takes about 15 minutes. The village was also previously served by the nearby Racks railway station which closed in 1965.
