= Ruthwell Cross =

Anglo-Saxon stone cross with famous carvings in Scotland

Coordinates: 55.000361°N 3.4075°W

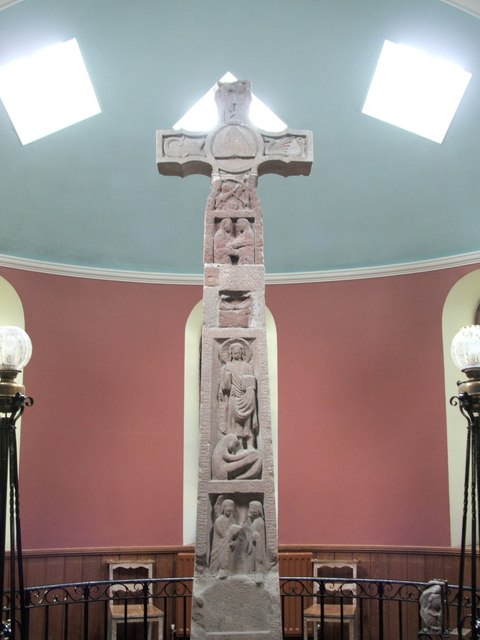
The Ruthwell Cross

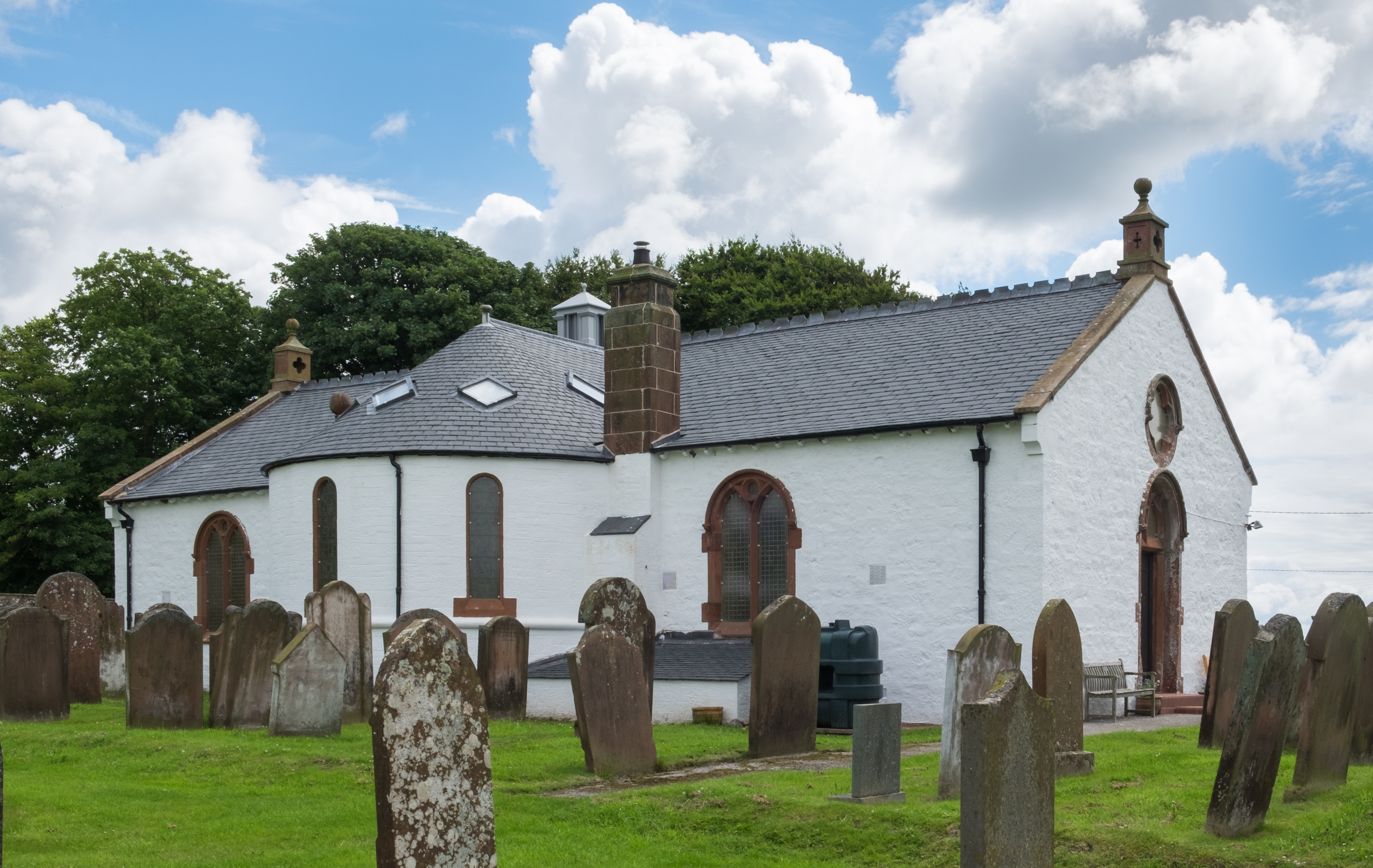
Ruthwell church showing annex that houses the cross

The Ruthwell Cross is a stone Anglo-Saxon cross probably dating from the 8th century, when the village of Ruthwell, now in Scotland, was part of the Anglo-Saxon Kingdom of Northumbria.

It is the most famous and elaborate Anglo-Saxon monumental sculpture, and possibly contains the oldest surviving text, predating any manuscripts containing Old English poetry. According to historian Nikolaus Pevsner, "The crosses of Bewcastle and Ruthwell ... are the greatest achievement of their date in the whole of Europe."

The cross was smashed by Presbyterian iconoclasts in 1642, and the pieces left in the churchyard until they were restored and re-erected in the manse garden in 1823 by Henry Duncan. In 1887 it was moved into its current location inside Ruthwell church, Dumfriesshire, Scotland, when the apse which holds it was specially built. It was designated a scheduled monument in 1921, but this was removed in 2018, due to it being in a controlled, safe environment and not needing protection.

== Description ==
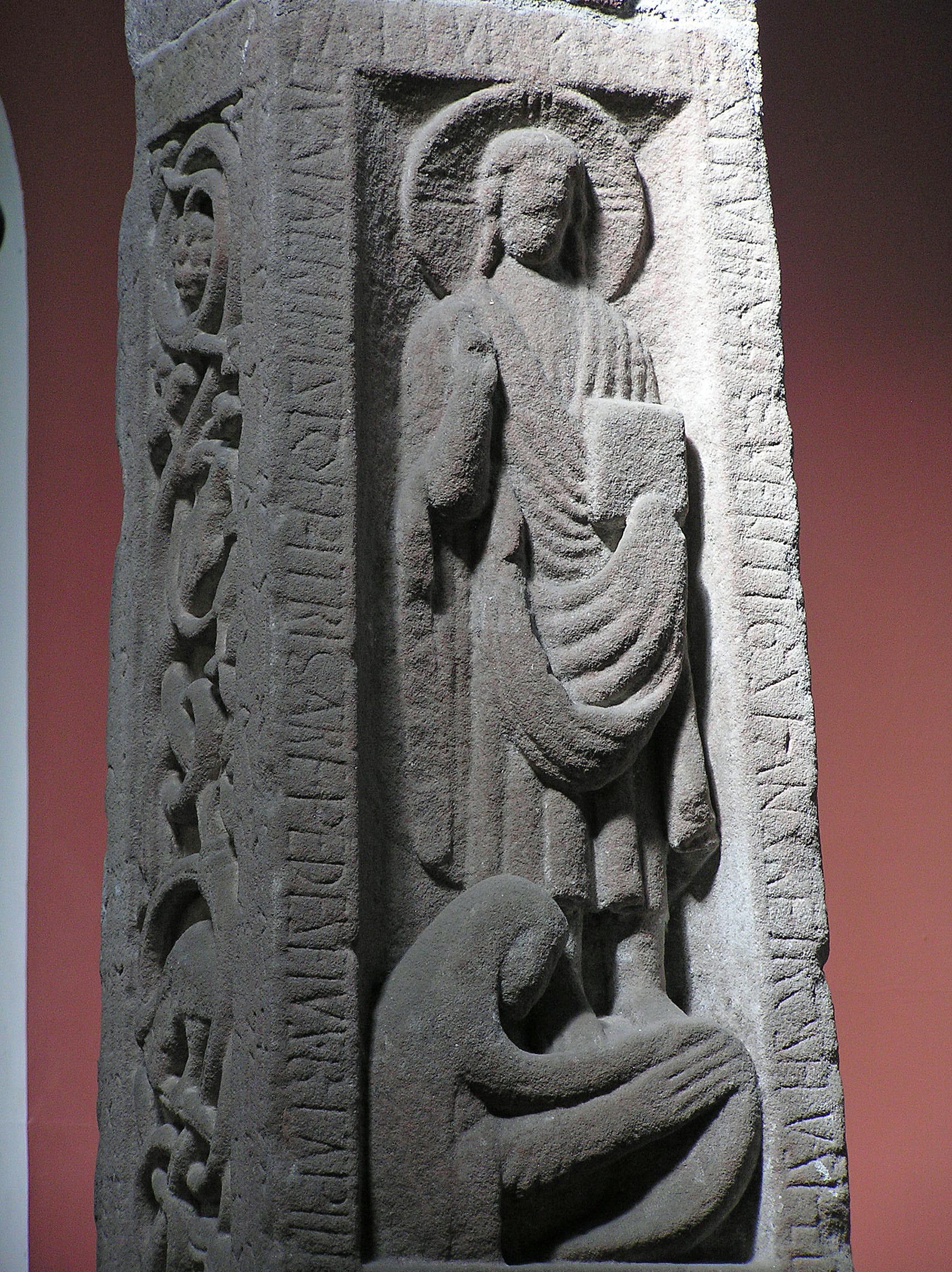
The washing of Christ's feet, south side.

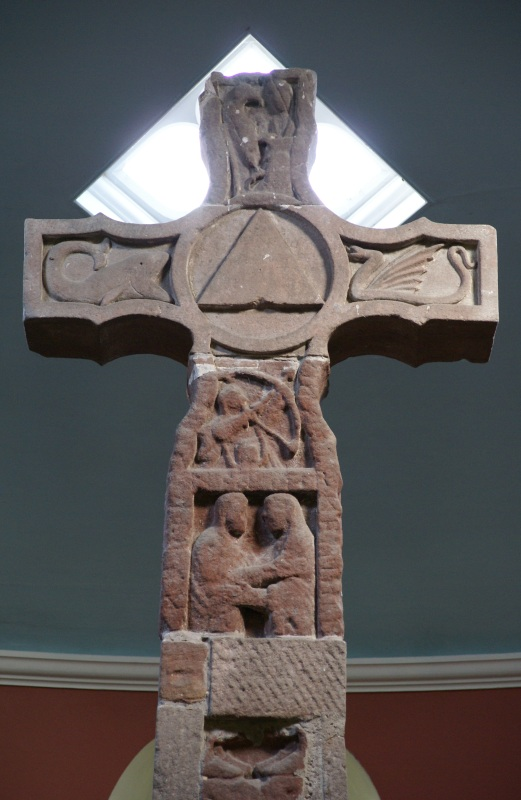
Top of the south face

Anglo-Saxon crosses are closely related to the contemporary Irish high crosses, and both are part of the Insular art tradition. The Ruthwell cross features the largest figurative reliefs found on any surviving Anglo-Saxon cross—which are among the largest surviving Anglo-Saxon reliefs of any sort—and has inscriptions in both Latin and, unusually for a Christian monument, the runic alphabet, the latter containing lines similar to lines 39–64 of Dream of the Rood, an Old English poem, which were possibly added at a later date. It is 18 feet (5.5 m) high.

The two main sides of the cross (north and south) feature figurative relief carvings, now considerably worn, that depict Christ and several other figures; their subjects and interpretation have been much discussed by art historians, and the cross continues to be "one of the most extensive and most studied of all surviving visual programs of the early Middle Ages." It is clear to most scholars that the images and texts each form part of a sophisticated and unified programme, "almost an academician's monument," though different schemes have been proposed.

The largest panel on the cross (north side) shows either Christ treading on the beasts, a subject especially popular with the Anglo-Saxons, or its rare pacific variant Christ as Judge recognised by the beasts in the desert, as suggested by the unique Latin inscription surrounding the panel: "IHS XPS iudex aequitatis; bestiae et dracones cognoverunt in deserto salvatorem mundi" – "Jesus Christ: the judge of righteousness: the beasts and dragons recognised in the desert the saviour of the world." Whatever the subject, it is clearly the same as the very similar relief that is the largest panel on the nearby Bewcastle Cross which was probably created by the same artists. Below this is Saints Paul and Antony breaking bread in the desert, another rare scene identified by an inscription ("Sanctus Paulus et Antonius duo eremitae fregerunt panem in deserto"), then either a Flight into Egypt or perhaps a Return from Egypt, and at the bottom a scene too worn to decipher, which may have been a Nativity of Christ.

On the south side is Mary Magdalene drying the feet of Christ, which is bordered by the longest Latin inscription on the cross: "Attulit alabastrum unguenti et stans retro secus pedes eius lacrimis coepit rigare pedes eius et capillis capitas sui tergebat" – see Luke 7:37–38 and John 12:3. Below this is the Healing of the man born blind from John 9:1, inscribed: "Et praeteriens vidit hominem caecum a natibitate et sanavit eum ab infirmitate," the Annunciation ("Et ingressus angelus ad eam dixit ave gratia plena dominus tecum benedicta tu in mulieribus" – “And an angel came to her saying, “Hail, full of grace, the Lord is with you. Blessed are you amongst women.””-- Luke 1:28) and the Crucifixion, which on stylistic grounds is considered to have been added at a considerably later period.

These scenes are on the main, lower, section of the shaft, which was broken above the largest scenes, and possibly the two sections were not restored the right way round. Above the large scene on the north side is either John the Baptist holding a lamb, or possibly God the Father holding the Lamb of God, who opens a book as in Revelation 5:1–10. Above this (and another break) are two remaining figures of the Four Evangelists with their symbols that were originally on the four arms of the cross-head: St. Matthew on the lowest arm, and St. John the Evangelist on the top arm. The side arms and centre roundel of the cross are replacements, of purely speculative (and most improbable) design.

On the south side, Martha and Mary (with inscription) are followed by an archer, the subject of almost as much debate as the judging Christ, on the lowest arm of the Cross, and an eagle on the top arm.

== Destruction and restoration ==
The cross escaped injury at the time of general destruction during the Reformation in the sixteenth century, but in 1640 the General Assembly of the Church of Scotland ordered the "many idolatrous monuments erected and made for religious worship" to be "taken down, demolished, and destroyed." Two years later the cross was taken down when an Act was passed "anent the Idolatrous Monuments in Ruthwell." The usual account is that the cross was taken down in the church or churchyard soon after the 1642 order and broken up. One piece, it appears, was used as a bench to sit upon. The pieces were later removed from the church and left out in the churchyard. By 1823, Henry Duncan had collected all the pieces he could find, and put them together, commissioning a new crossbeam (the original was lost), and having gaps filled in with small pieces of stone. He then erected it in the manse garden.

== Cross or pillar ==
It has been suggested that the work was not originally a cross. In a 2008 journal article, Patrick W. Conner wrote that he would not call the structure a cross: "Fred Orton has argued persuasively that the lower stone on which the runic poem is found may, indeed, never have belonged to a standing cross, or if it did, that cannot be asserted with confidence now. For that reason, I shall refer throughout to the Ruthwell Monument in preference to the Ruthwell Cross."

In his 1998 essay, "Rethinking the Ruthwell Monument: Fragments and Critique; Tradition and History; Tongues and Sockets," Orton discusses a note Reginald Bainbrigg wrote to William Camden in 1600 for possible publication in any new edition of his 1586 Britannia: "Bainbrigg saw a 'column' which he referred to as a 'cross,'" Orton said of the note. Orton is also convinced the piece is made of two different types of stone: "... it seems to make more sense to see the Ruthwell monument as originally a column ... amended with the addition of a Crucifixion scene, and then ... further amended with the addition of a cross made of a different kind of stone."

== Runic inscription ==
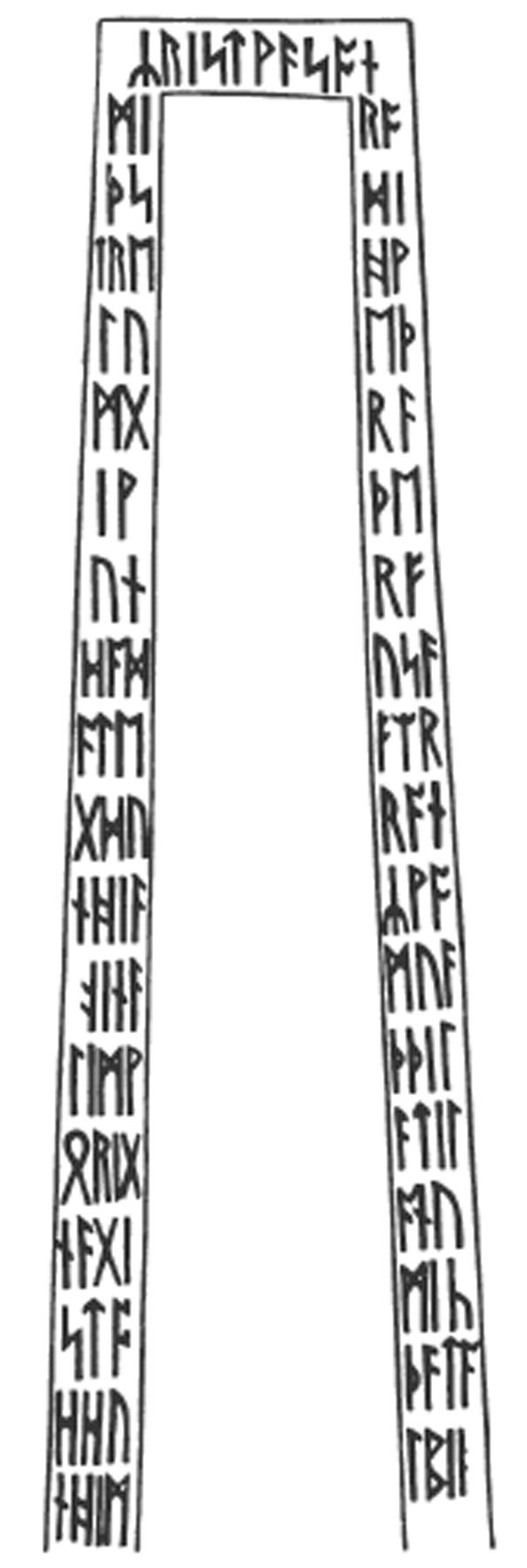
Drawing of the runic inscription (Dream of the Rood interpretation)

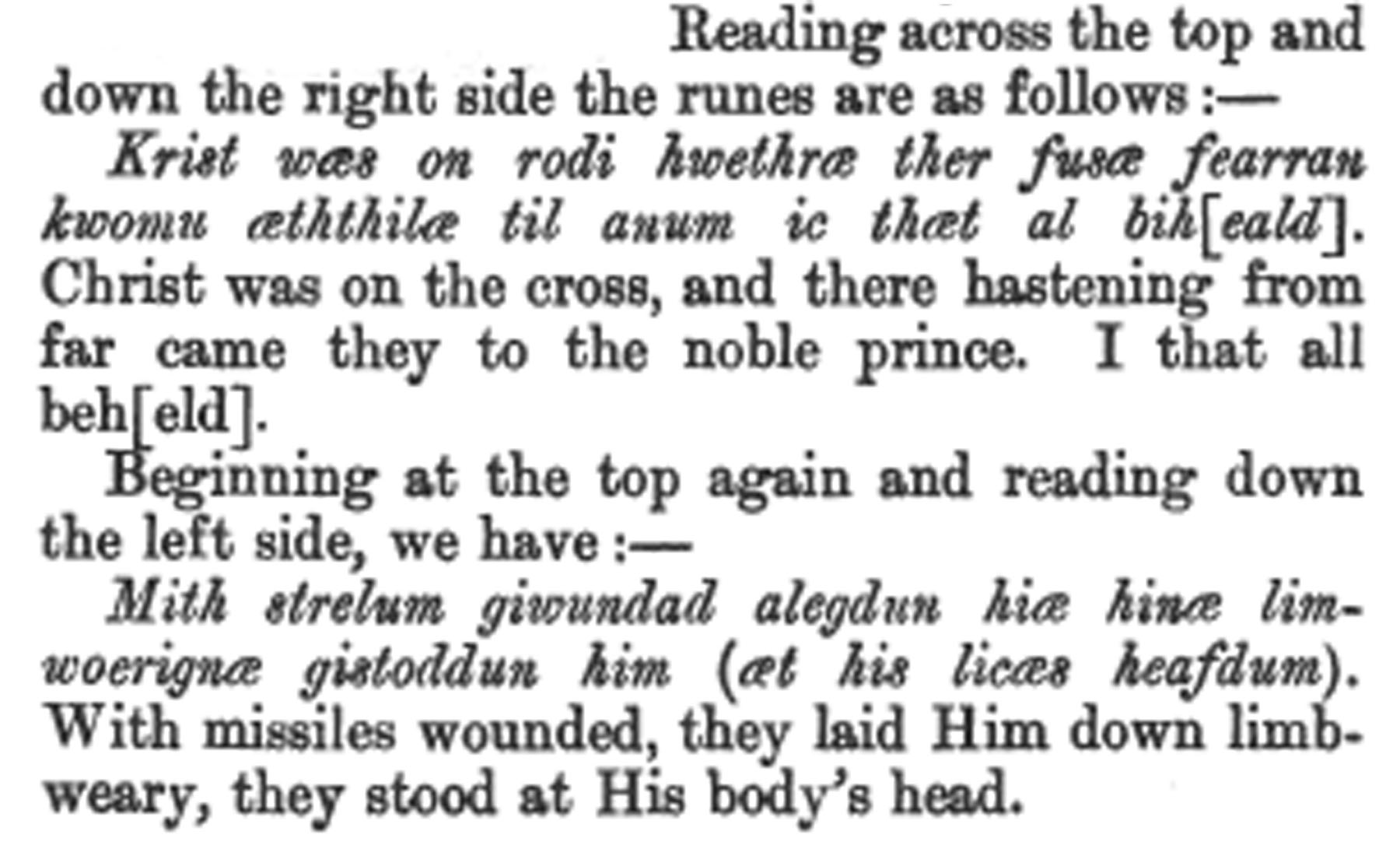
Translation of Ruthwell Cross Inscription

At each side of the vine-tracery runic inscriptions are carved. The runes were first described around 1600, and Reginald Bainbrigg of Appleby recorded the inscription for the Britannia of William Camden. Around 1832, the runes were recognised as different from the Scandinavian futhark (categorized as Anglo-Saxon runes) by Thorleif Repp, by reference to the Exeter Book. His rendition referred to a place called the vale of Ashlafr, compensation for injury, a font and a monastery of Therfuse. John Mitchell Kemble in 1840 advanced a reading referring to Mary Magdalene.

The better known Dream of the Rood interpretation is due to a revised reading of Kemble's in an 1842 article. The inscription along the top and left side is read as:

ᛣᚱᛁᛋᛏ ᚹᚫᛋ ᚩᚾ ᚱᚩᛞᛁ ᚻᚹᛖᚦᚱᚨ / ᚦᛖᚱ ᚠᚢᛋᚨ ᚠᛠᚱᚱᚪᚾ ᛣᚹᚩᛗᚢ / ᚨᚦᚦᛁᛚᚨ ᛏᛁᛚ ᚪᚾᚢᛗ / ᛁᚳ ᚦᚨᛏ ᚪᛚ ᛒᛁᚻ
Krist wæs on rodi. Hweþræ / þer fusæ fearran kwomu / æþþilæ til anum / ic þæt al bih[eald].
"Christ was on the cross. And there hastening from far came they to the noble prince. I beheld all that."

Kemble's revised reading is based on the poem of the Vercelli Book, to the extent that missing words in each are supplied from the other. Kemble notes how the inscription may be "corrected" with the help of the Vercelli Book. The inscription on the left side is read:

Mith strelum giwundad alegdun hiæ hinæ limwoerignæ gistoddun him
"With missiles wounded, they laid him down limb-weary, they stood by him"

The manuscript text reads:

Crīst wæs on rōde. Hwæðere þǣr fūse feorran cwōman tō þām Æðelinge; ic þæt eall behēold. [...] mid strǣlum forwundod. Ālēdon hīe ðǣr limwērigne, gestōdon him æt his līces hēafdum

The interpretation is disputed and may be a conjecture inserted by Kemble: O'Neill (2005) notes Kemble's "almost pathological dislike of Scandinavian interference in what he sees as the English domain."

Whether this is the oldest example of Old English poetry depends on the date allocated to the cross itself, and also the runic inscriptions, which may be later. The earliest English manuscripts containing poetry are two versions of Bede that contain Cædmon's Hymn, and are dated to the 8th century: the Moore Bede and Saint Petersburg Bede. The Franks Casket, usually ascribed to the early 8th century, may be similar in age to the Ruthwell Cross.

Many believe that the runes, as opposed to the Latin inscriptions, were added later, possibly as late as the 10th century. Conner agrees with Paul Meyvaert's conclusion that the runic poem dates from after the period in which the monument was created. He says Meyvaert has "satisfactorily explained" that the layout of the runes suggests "that the stone was already standing when the decision to add the runic poem was made." The runic inscription on the monument is not a "formulaic" memorial text of the kind usually carved in Old English on stone. Rather, Conner sees the content of the runic addition to the monument as related to prayers used in the adoration of the cross first composed in the tenth century, well after the creation of the monument.

== Scan ==
The "Visionary Cross project", led by Catherine Karkov, Daniel Paul O'Donnell, and Roberto Rosselli Del Turco, studies crosses such as the Ruthwell Cross, the Bewcastle Cross, and the Brussels Cross, and in 2012 performed 3D-scans at Ruthwell.

=== Gallery ===
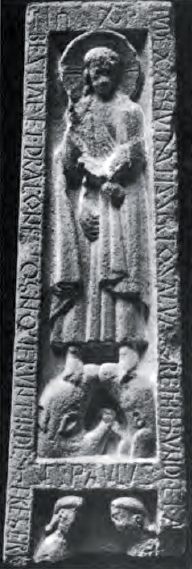
Christ as judge, with two animals, north side

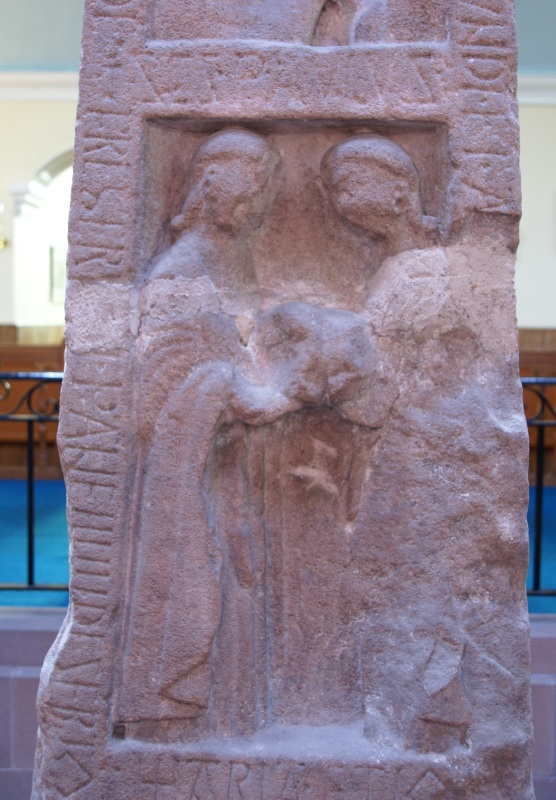
Paul and Anthony sharing food in the desert, north side

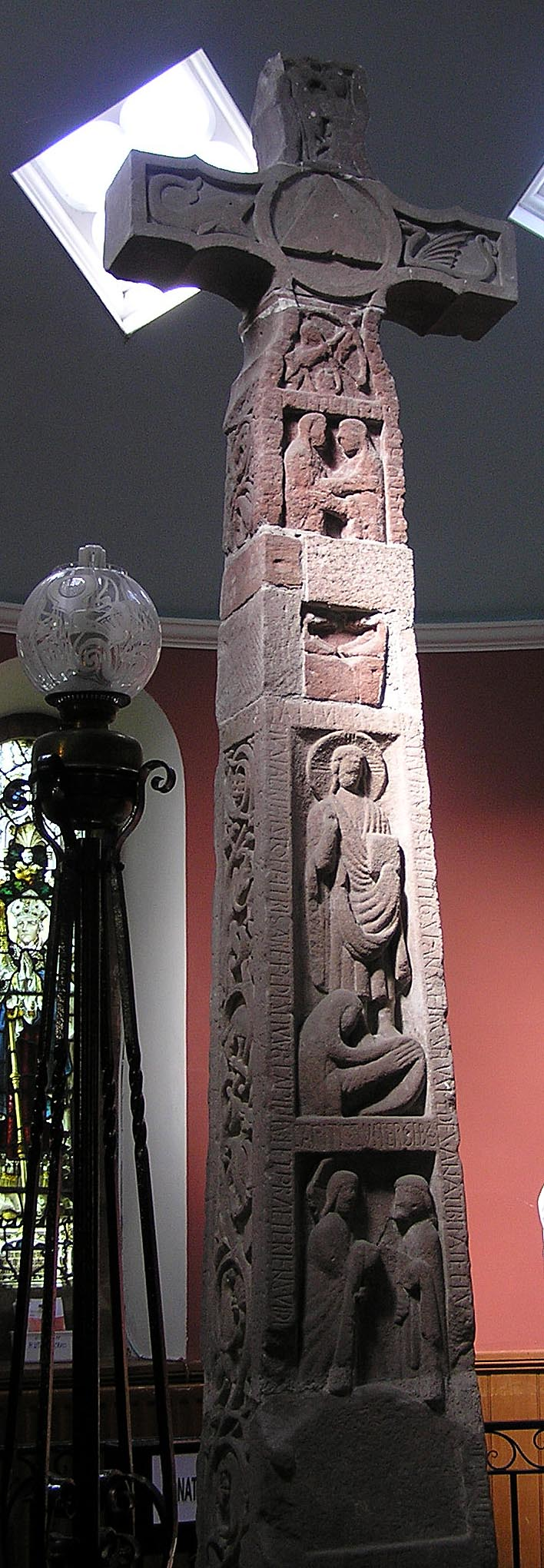
Overall view of the south side

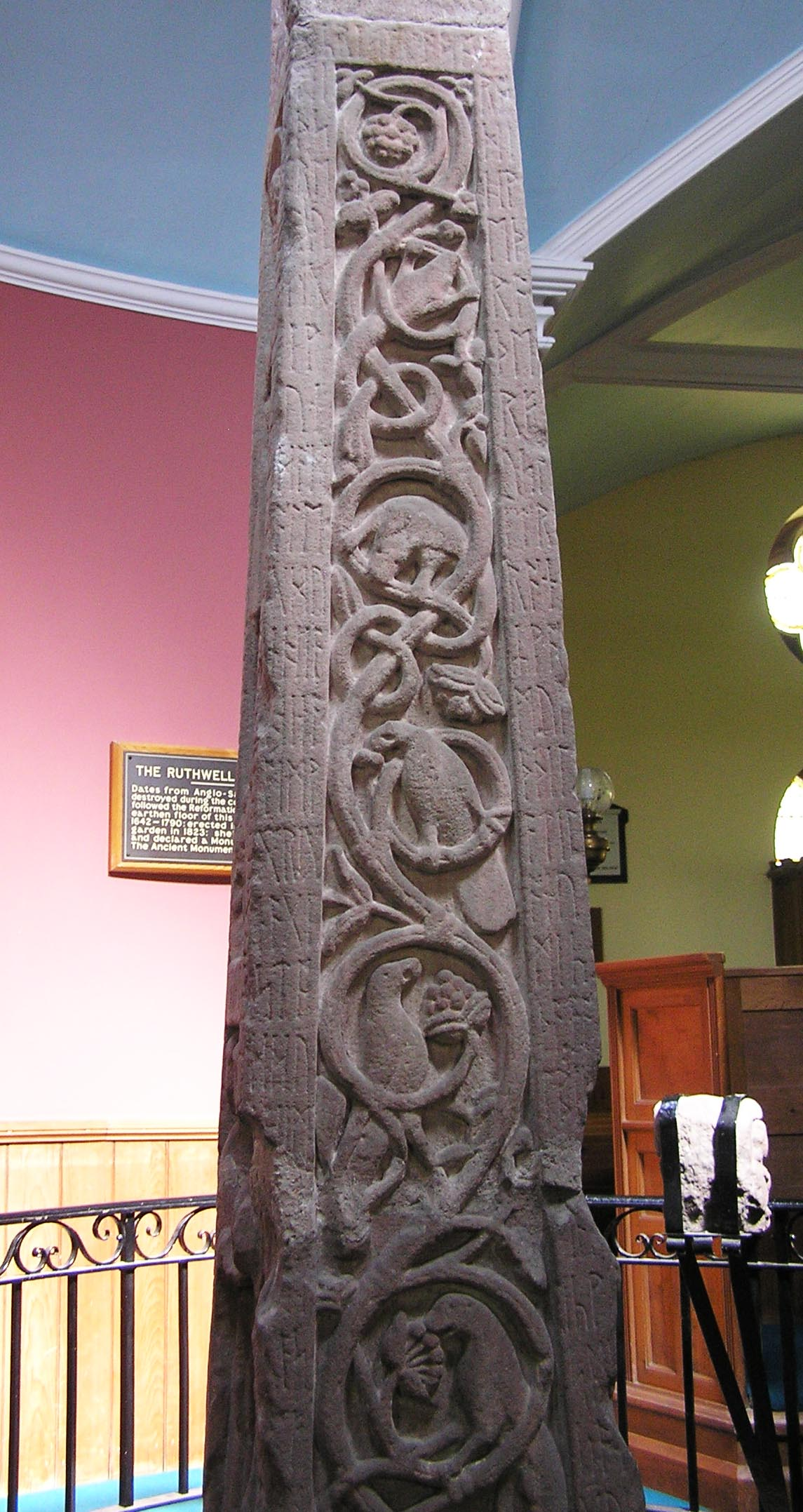
Vine scrolls and creatures on the west side

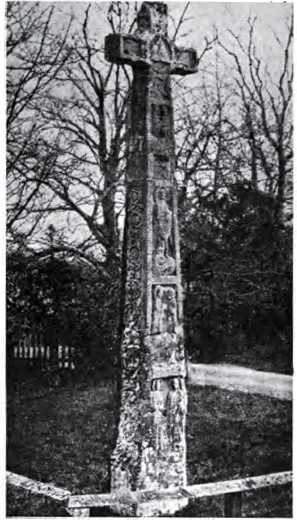
When outside in the 19th century

== See also ==
- Nith Bridge cross
- Easby Cross in the Victoria and Albert Museum, with Bewcastle and Ruthwell the best preserved Northumbrian cross
- Scheduled monuments in Dumfries and Galloway
- Franks Casket

== Digital editions ==
- Old English Poetry in Facsimile Project https://oepoetryfacsimile.org/?document=13208&document=13205, ed. by Foys, Martin et al. (Center for the History of Print and Digital Culture, University of Wisconsin-Madison, 2019-); object text edited with 3D-scanned facsimile images from The Visionary Cross project, with runic transcription and transliteration, editorial notes, and a Modern English translation
