= Brussels Cross =

Anglo-Saxon cross-reliquary

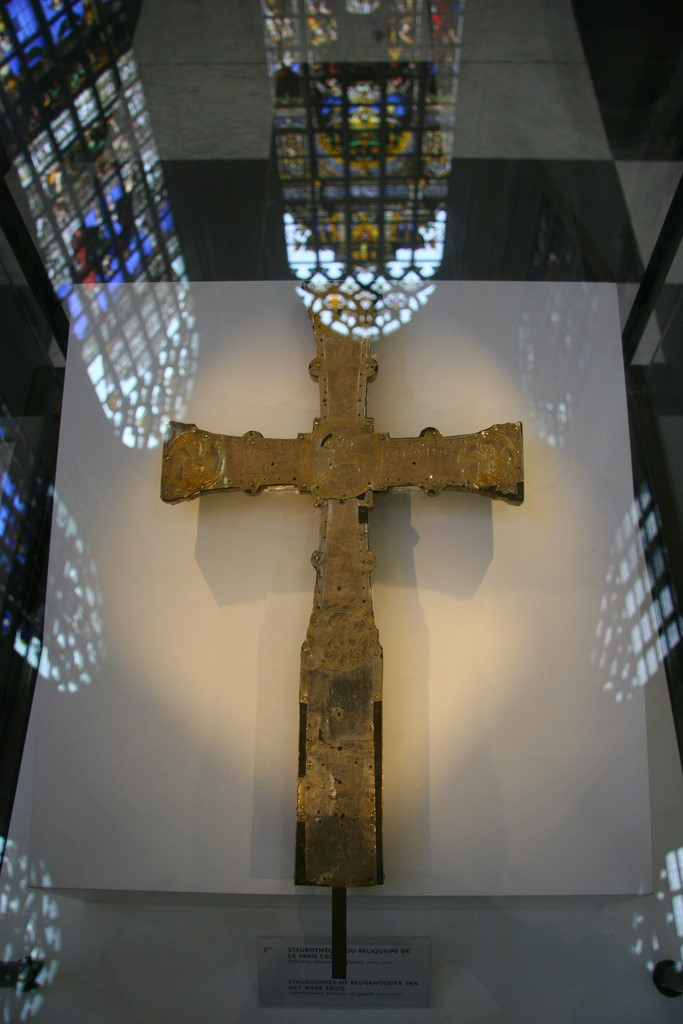
The Brussels Cross on display

The Brussels Cross or Drahmal Cross is an Anglo-Saxon cross-reliquary of the early 11th century, now in the treasury of the Cathedral of St. Michael and St. Gudula in Brussels, that bears engraved images and an inscription in Old English.

== Description ==
Badly damaged and with its once jewelled front missing, the Brussels Cross takes the form of a large piece of cross-shaped wood covered with a silver plate bearing medallions engraved with the evangelists' symbols at the end of the arms and an Agnus Dei at the centre. Across the arms the artist has inscribed his name in large Latin letters: + Drahmal me worhte (‘Drahmal made me’). An inscription around the edges reads: + Rod is min nama; geo ic ricne Cyning bær byfigynde, blod bestemed (‘Rood is my name. Trembling once, I bore a powerful king, made wet with blood’). These lines bear a close relationship to ll. 44 and 48 in the Old English poem, 'The Dream of the Rood'. This is followed by a common form of dedication: þas rod het Æþmær wyrican and Aðelwold hys beroþo[r] Criste to lofe for Ælfrices saule hyra beroþor (‘Æthlmær and Athelwold, his brother, ordered this rood to be made so as to praise Christ for the soul of Ælfric, their brother’). The Anglo-Saxon inscription is contained on a silver strip which runs around the edges of the cross. It is written not in runes, but in Roman letters, in a curious mixture of Latin-style majuscules and minuscules. The letters 'NE' of ricne, 'NG' of cyning and 'ME' of bestemed are written as ligatures. Although it has not proved possible to identify with any certainty the persons named in the inscription, the text is in late West-Saxon which would ascribe it to the late tenth century or perhaps later.

== Provenance ==
The Brussels Cross and its two-line inscription in Anglo-Saxon verse were first brought to public attention in modern times by H. Logeman in 1891. Traditionally reputed to contain the largest extant fragments of the True Cross, it has been preserved at the Cathedral of SS. Michel and Gudule since the middle of the seventeenth century. The cross is 46.5 by 28 cm. (18.3 by 11 inches) in size. The front was once covered by a jewelled gold plate, probably taken away by French soldiers under Dumouriez in 1793; the back is still covered with silver, with the symbols of the four evangelists at the ends of the four arms and the symbol of the Agnus Dei in the centre. The earlier Lothair Cross is a comparable work that is still intact. The name of the craftsman, Drahmal, is probably Norse and from the northern England, but nothing more can be deduced about him. Judging from the language of the inscription as well as from the epigraphy and the style of the images, the cross most likely dates from the beginning of the 11th century. The images are in a "stolid" version of the early "Winchester style".

== The Three Brothers ==
The Brussels Cross was created in England, but the three brothers, Ælfric, Æthelmær and Æthelwold, cited in the prose part of the inscription, have never been positively identified. The language is a fairly regular late West-Saxon, with one Anglian form, bestemed, and a few irregular spellings, such as byfigynde (with 'y' for 'e' in the ending) in the verse, wyrican and beroþor (both with an intrusive vowel) in the prose. The form bestemed (for West-Saxon bestiemed, bestymed) does not necessarily indicate a northern origin for the inscription; it is usually explained as a traditional spelling taken over from older poetic vocabulary.

Some scholars have identified Ælfric, Æthelmær and Æthelwold with Africus, Agelmarus and Agelwardus of Worcester around the year 1007. Others have suggested that the Æthelmær is the well-known patron of Ælfric, who founded the abbey at Eynsham in 1005, but offer no identification of the other two names. It is possible, furthermore, that the holy relic which forms part of the present cross is the same as the lignum Domini ('Wood of the Lord') sent by Pope Marinus to King Alfred in 883 or 885. None of these possibilities is susceptible to proof. The Belgian scholar Simone D’Ardenne offers the most plausible analysis. She favours the identification of the relic with Alfred’s lignum Domini ('Wood of the Lord'), and she has studied all the available evidence to present a highly plausible account of its later history. According to her, the relic remained in the hands of the West-Saxon royal family until near the end of the tenth century, when it left the possession of the direct line. Its new owners had it enclosed in a reliquary (the present cross) and presented it to Westminster Abbey. It later found its way to the Netherlands, probably during the reign of the last Norman King of England, Stephen (1135–1154), when numbers of Flemish soldiers were in England.
