= Heathen Gods in Old English Literature =

1997 book by Richard North

- Cover, depicting a coin from the reign of Offa of Mercia
- Author: Richard North
- Language: English
- Subject: Anglo-Saxon history, Anglo-Saxon literature
- Publisher: Cambridge University Press
- Publication date: 1997
- Publication place: United Kingdom
- Media type: Print (Hardcover and softcover)
- Pages: 374
- ISBN: 978-0-521-03026-7

Heathen Gods in Old English Literature is a historical study of the literary references for several pagan deities in Anglo-Saxon England. Written by the English studies scholar Richard North of University College London, it was first published by Cambridge University Press in 1997. The book was released as the twenty-second monograph in the Press' series Cambridge Studies in Anglo-Saxon England, edited by Simon Keynes, Michael Lapidge and Andy Orchard. Prior to the book's publication, North had previously authored other studies of Anglo-Saxon paganism, such as Pagan Words and Christian Meanings (1991).

Heathen Gods in Old English Literature details North's theory that the god Ing played a prominent role in the pre-Christian religion of Anglo-Saxon England, and highlights references to him in such texts as Beowulf and the sole surviving Anglo-Saxon copy of the Book of Exodus.

The book received mixed reviews in peer reviewed journals such as The Modern Language Review. Critics argued that North's interpretations of the evidence were too speculative.

== Synopsis ==
In the opening chapter, entitled "Nerthus and Terra Mater: Anglian religion in the first century", North begins by describing the approach that he has taken in this particular study of Anglo-Saxon paganism. Highlighting how little information regarding pre-Christian beliefs was recorded in the surviving Old English literature, all of which was produced in the Christian period, he argues that scholars must approach the subject by looking at the literary evidence produced by related Germanic-language societies elsewhere in Europe. He argues that by studying both the 1st-century accounts of Tacitus regarding religion in continental Germania and the Late Medieval accounts from Iceland and Scandinavia, scholars can shed further light on lost aspects of Anglo-Saxon heathenism.

Chapter two, "Ingui of Bernicia" looks at the concept of an Anglo-Saxon god named Ing. He discusses the existence of the Ingvaeones, a tribe in first-century Germania, arguing that they may have been devoted to Ing. Drawing comparisons from the cult of Dionysus in the Classical world, North argues that "Ing- was first a functional term for a human embodiment of Nerthus, then for a man representing Nerthus." Proceeding to discuss the role of the Vanir in Norse mythology, he deals with Ingvi-Freyr of Uppsala in Sweden and then Ingui of Bernicia in Northern England, ultimately concluding that in early Anglo-Saxon history, a deity named Ingui was believed to be the progenitor of Anglian kings.

The third chapter is entitled "Ingui's cult remembered: Ing and the ingefolc" and deals with the literary evidence for a godly figure called Ing in Anglo-Saxon England.

== Arguments ==
=== Ing- ===
North spends much of his book devoted to the argument that there was a god known as Ing in Anglo-Saxon England. He highlights the fact that this Ing-hypostasis appears in various different contexts within Germanic-speaking Europe; it appears in the name of the Ingvaeones, a tribal grouping referred to in Tacitus' Germania, while in the later records of Norse mythology, the son of the god Njǫrð is known as Ignvi-freyr.

From an examination of Tacitus' account, North argues that the Ingvaeone tribe would have worshiped the deity Nerthus, whom Tacitus described as an earth goddess. Although Tacitus never explicitly stated that the Ingvaeone worshiped Nerthus, North considers it likely because they lived proximi Oceano, near the sea, while Tacitus located the temple of Nerthus in insula Oceani, within the land of the Suebi tribe; North believes that these are sufficiently close to one another that they would have worshiped the same deity. North translates "Ingvaeone" as meaning "friends of Ing-".

== Reception and recognition ==
=== Academic reviews ===
North's work was reviewed by T.A. Shippey of Saint Louis University for The Modern Language Review. Taking a critical approach to the book, Shippey was of the opinion that the author's arguments relied "very heavily on assumptions about the precise (one might say gnostic) meanings of sometimes rather common words." He argues that many will not accept some of North's "more complex arguments" and that North's interpretation of Deor, 11. 14-6, via Hdvamdl, stanzas 96-102 as a political satire on Æthelwulf of Wessex was "especially strained". However, on a more positive note Shippey accepted the "intrinsic plausibility" of North's presentation of Anglo-Saxon paganism as a "natural religion" which posed little threat or opposition to the incoming Christianity.

=== Wider influence ===
In his book, The Elder Gods: The Otherworld of Early England (2011), the English Anglo-Saxonist Stephen Pollington noted that North's book had been criticised for being "too free" in the interpretation of sources, but felt that it nonetheless "relieved the researcher from the emasculating fear of making an assumption or two and testing them against the evidence."
