= Jane C. Bonar =

Scottish hymnwriter (1821–1884)

- Born: Jane Catharine Lundie; 1 December 1821; Kelso, Scottish Borders, Scotland
- Died: 3 December 1884 (aged 63); Edinburgh, Scotland
- Occupation: hymnwriter
- Spouse: Horatius Bonar (m. 1843)
- Children: 9
- Relatives: John Grey, Josephine Butler, Henry Duncan
- Writing career
- Language: English
- Notable works: "Pass away, earthly joy!"

Jane C. Bonar (née, Lundie; 1 December 1821 – 3 December 1884) was a Scottish hymnwriter. Her hymn, "Pass away, earthly joy!", first appeared in 1843 in Songs for the Wilderness. Two years after, it reappeared in The Bible Hymn Book, compiled by her husband, Horatius Bonar, and was reprinted in the United States with other names appended.

== Early life and education ==
Jane Catharine (or Catherine) Lundie (or Lundee) was born at Kelso, 1 December 1821, in the old manse by the River Tweed, located by the Abbey. She was a daughter of Robert Lundie, minister of Kelso, who had attained literary accomplishments, and, besides being acquainted with Sir Walter Scott and other literary celebrities, was an early contributor to the Quarterly Review. Her mother, Mary Grey, was a native of Northumberland. She was a daughter of George Grey and Mary Gray. Mrs. Gray, the sister of John Grey and aunt of Josephine Butler, was an intellectual who, besides being the author of several volumes, assisted her husband in matters pertaining to his parishioners. She compiled the memoirs of Matthias Bruen who lived with the Lundie family for some time. Bonar's paternal grandfather, Cornelius Lundie, had also been minister of Kelso, and had preached in Kelso Abbey before its ruined condition required the erection of a new building which was occupied by her father.

In April, 1832, Bonar's father died, and in the autumn, with her widowed mother, her elder sister, Mary Lundie Duncan, and brother, she removed to Edinburgh. In 1835, she was sent to a school in London, and developed a friendship in Mrs. Evans, the friend of her sister Mary. She also spent time with her sister at the manse in Cleish, until 1840, when Mary, a poet and memoirist, died.

An elder brother, George Archibald Lundie, went with a missionary band to Samoa, hoping that the climate might restore his failing health, but died in less than three years. There were two other brothers, Cornelius, engineer and railway manager of a branch in South Wales, and Robert, minister of the Presbyterian Church, Fairfield, Liverpool.

== Career ==
Bonar's poetry possessed a deep spirituality of tone and a submissive glint of piety. Her hymns appeared in Dr. Bonar's Songs for the Wilderness, 1843–4, and his Bible Hymn Book, 1845. She was chiefly known through her hymn, "Pass away, earthly joy, Jesus, all in all", which appeared in the Songs for the Wilderness, 2nd Series, 1844, and again in the Bible Hymn Book 1845, No. 108, in 4 st. of 8 1., including the refrain, “Jesus is mine!” The original text was given in Dr. Edwin Francis Hatfield's Church Hymn Book, 1872, No. 661. Sometimes, this was altered to “Fade, fade, each earthly joy,” as in the American Songs for the Sanctuary, 1865, No. 774, and others. The last stanza of this hymn was also stanza iv. of the cento, “Now I have found a friend,” and others.

== Personal life ==
On 16 August 1843, she married Rev. Horatius Bonar, becoming the first Free Church minister's wife. After marriage, she lived in the manse of Kelso. Intervening years were spent partly in Edinburgh and partly in Ruthwell, her mother having married Rev. Henry Duncan of that parish. These were years of varied financial circumstances. She removed to Edinburgh with her husband and family in 1867.

Of their nine children, five died young.

- Mary Lundie, born 14 June 1844 (married 29 August 1876, George Theophilus Dodds, M'All Mission, Paris)
- James, born 25 May, died 19 July 1847
- Marjory Emily Jane, born 29 August 1849, died 28 June 1850
- Christian Cornelia, born 10 October 1852, died 17 July 1869
- Lucy Jane, born 22 September 1854, died 20 August 1858
- Eliza Maitland, born 10 September 1857
- Horatius Ninian, sometime minister of United Free Church, Saltoun, born 2 April 1860
- Emily Florence, born 26 December 1861 (married 2 August 1894, Duncan Clark MacNicol, minister of Stockbridge United Free Church, Edinburgh)
- Henry Robert, born 17 December 1865, died 26 March 1869.

With health never very strong, Bonar often wore herself out for others. She died at Edinburgh on 3 December 1884. “He giveth me Salvation,” were among her last words.

== "Joyful Trust" ==
1
FADE, fade, each earthly joy;
Jesus is mine.
Break, every tender tie;
Jesus is mine.
Dark is the wilderness,
Earth has no resting-place,
Jesus alone can bless;
Jesus is mine.

2
Farewell, ye dreams of night;
Jesus is mine.
Lost in this dawning bright,
Jesus is mine.
All that my soul has tried
Left but a dismal void;
Jesus has satisfied;
Jesus is mine.

-Mrs. Jane Catharine Lundee Bonar, 1845, Ab.
