= Henry Duncan (minister) =

Scottish minister, banker and social reformer (1774-1846)

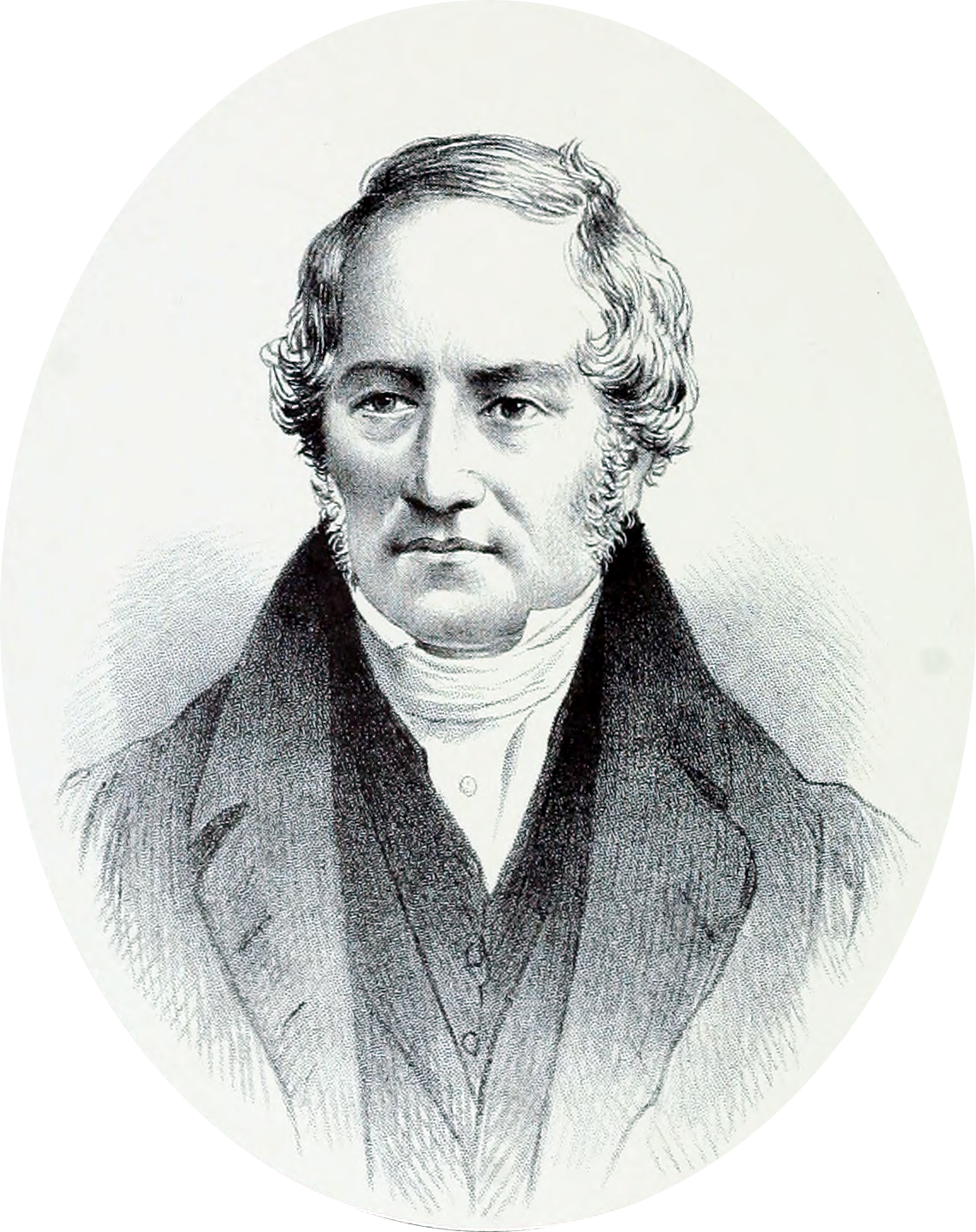
- Henry Duncan from Disruption Worthies

Personal details
- Born: 8 October 1774 Lochrutton, Kirkcudbrightshire, Scotland, U.K.
- Died: 12 February 1846 (aged 71) Scotland, U.K.
- Occupation: minister known for founding the world's first commercial savings bank
- Education: Dumfries Academy; University of St Andrews

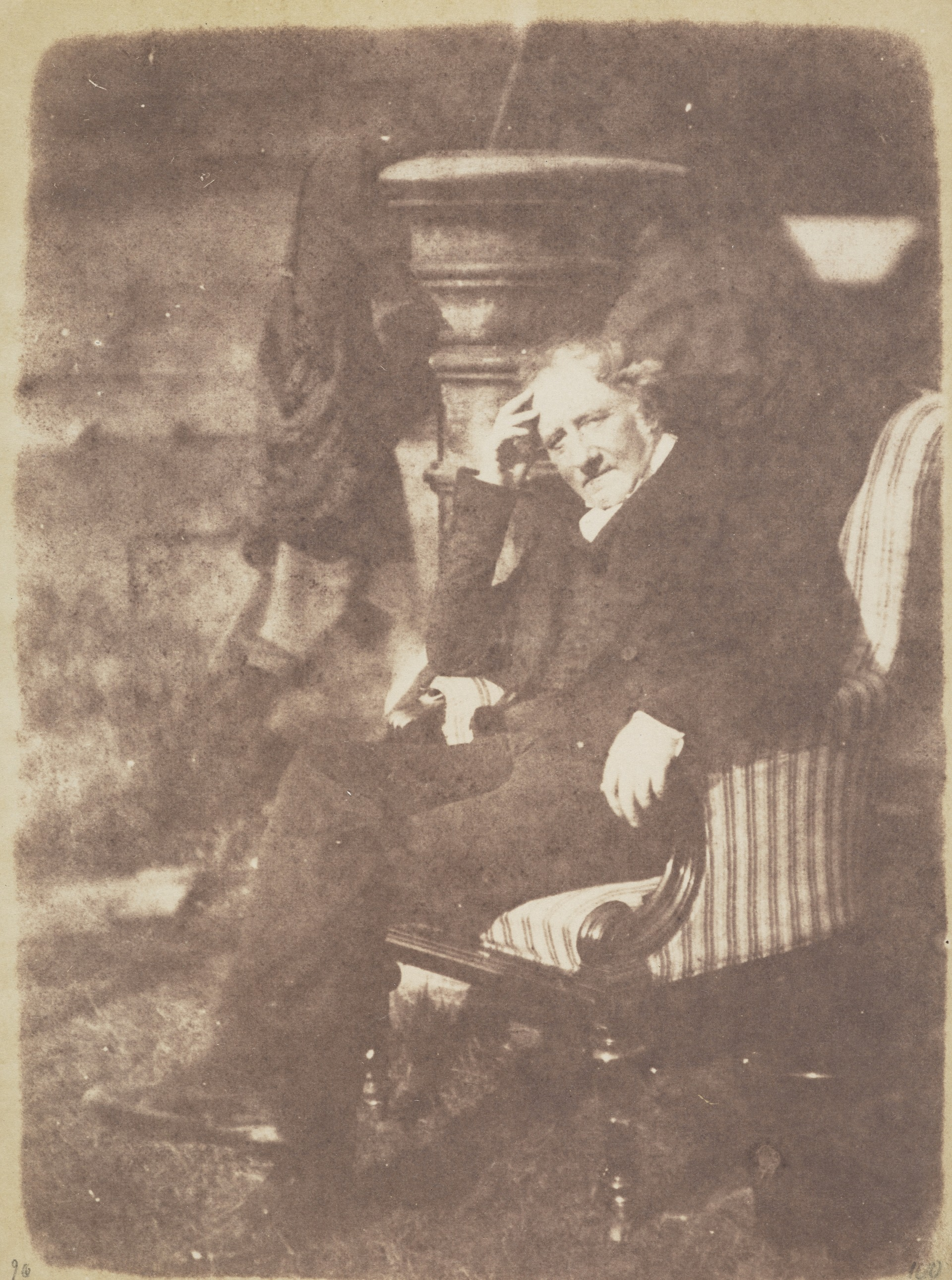
Henry Duncan by Hill & Adamson

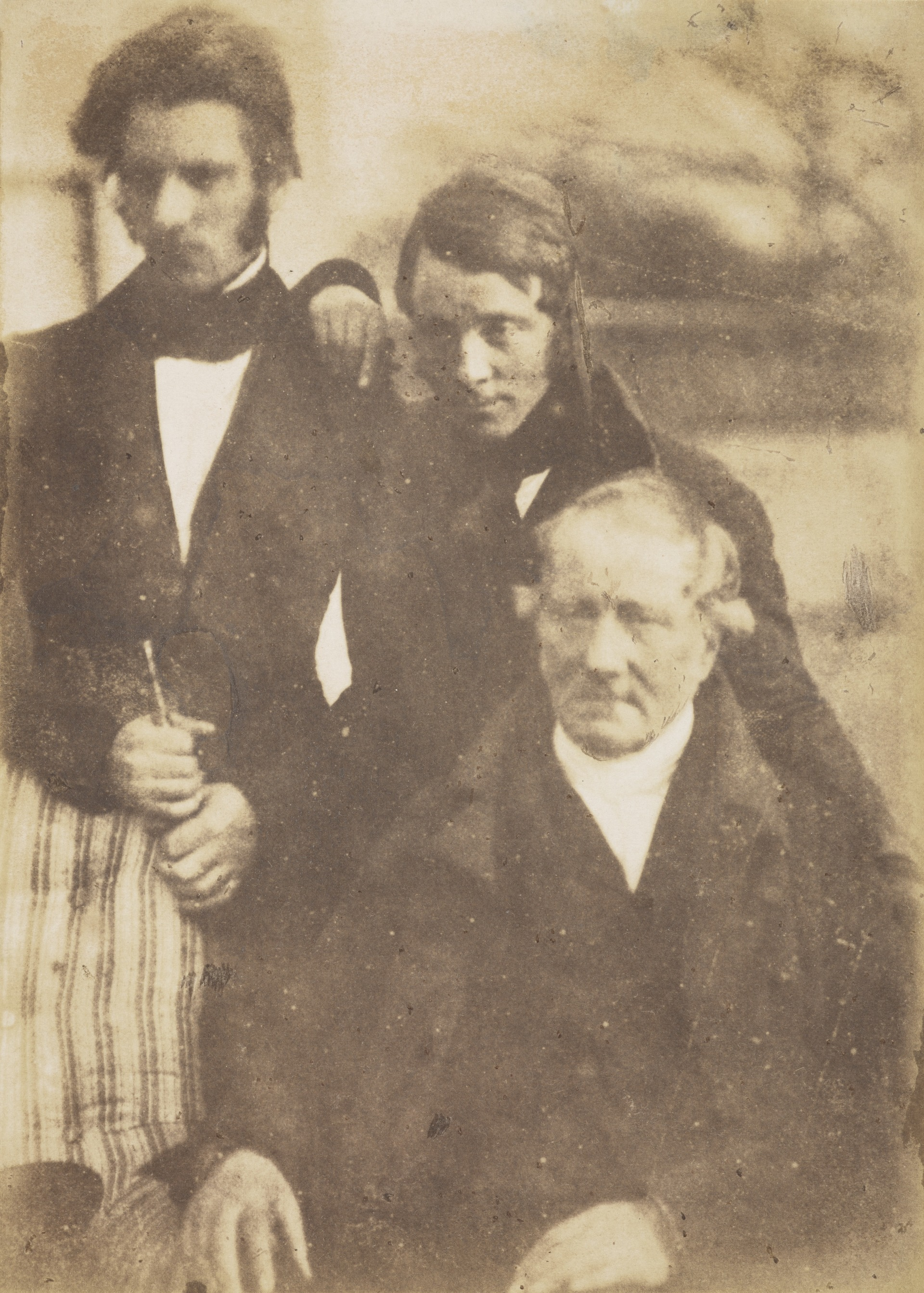
Rev. William Wallace Duncan, Rev. Dr George John Craig Duncan (Henry's son and biographer) and Rev. Henry Duncan

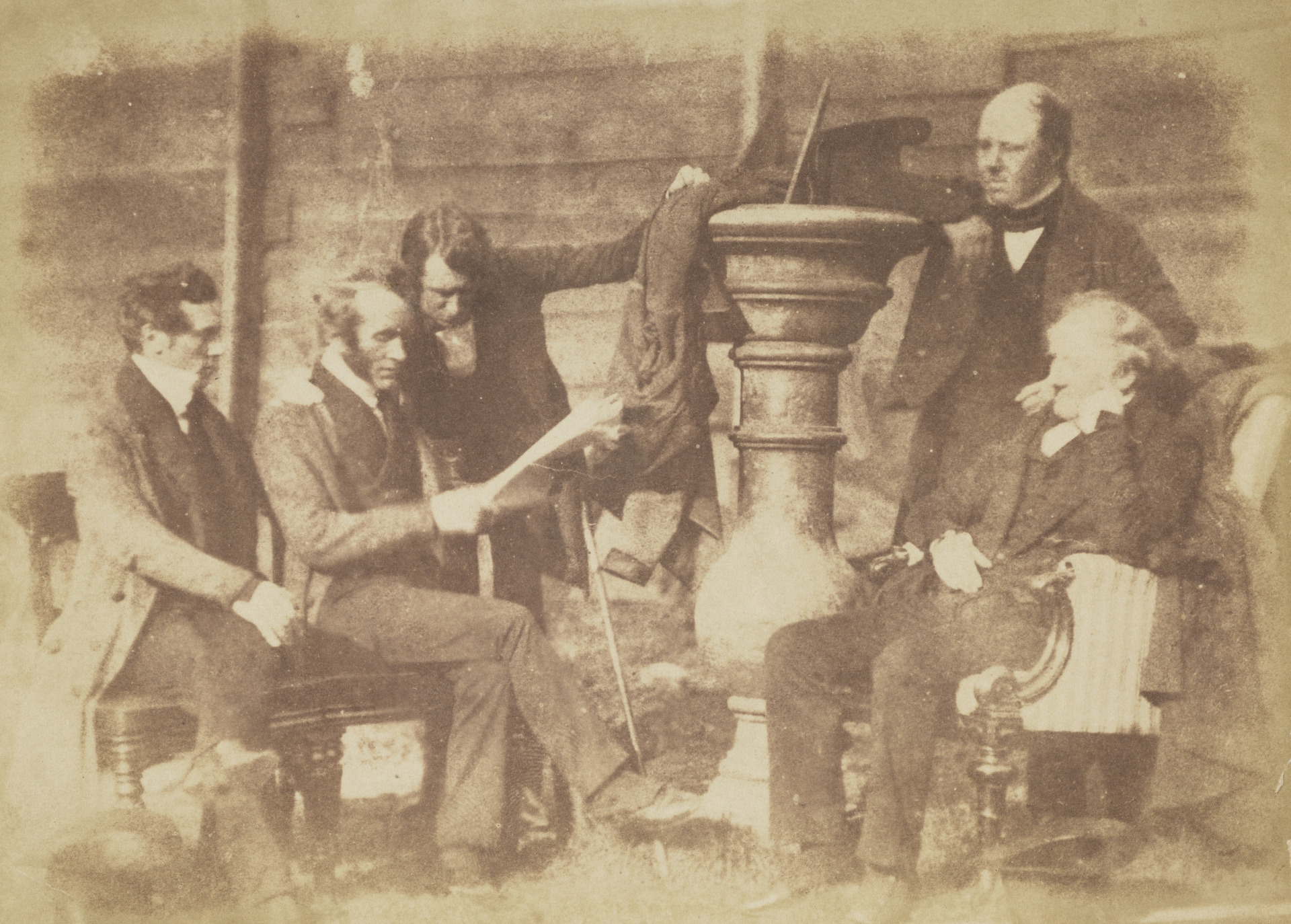
Annan Presbytery by Hill & Adamson from National Galleries Scotland

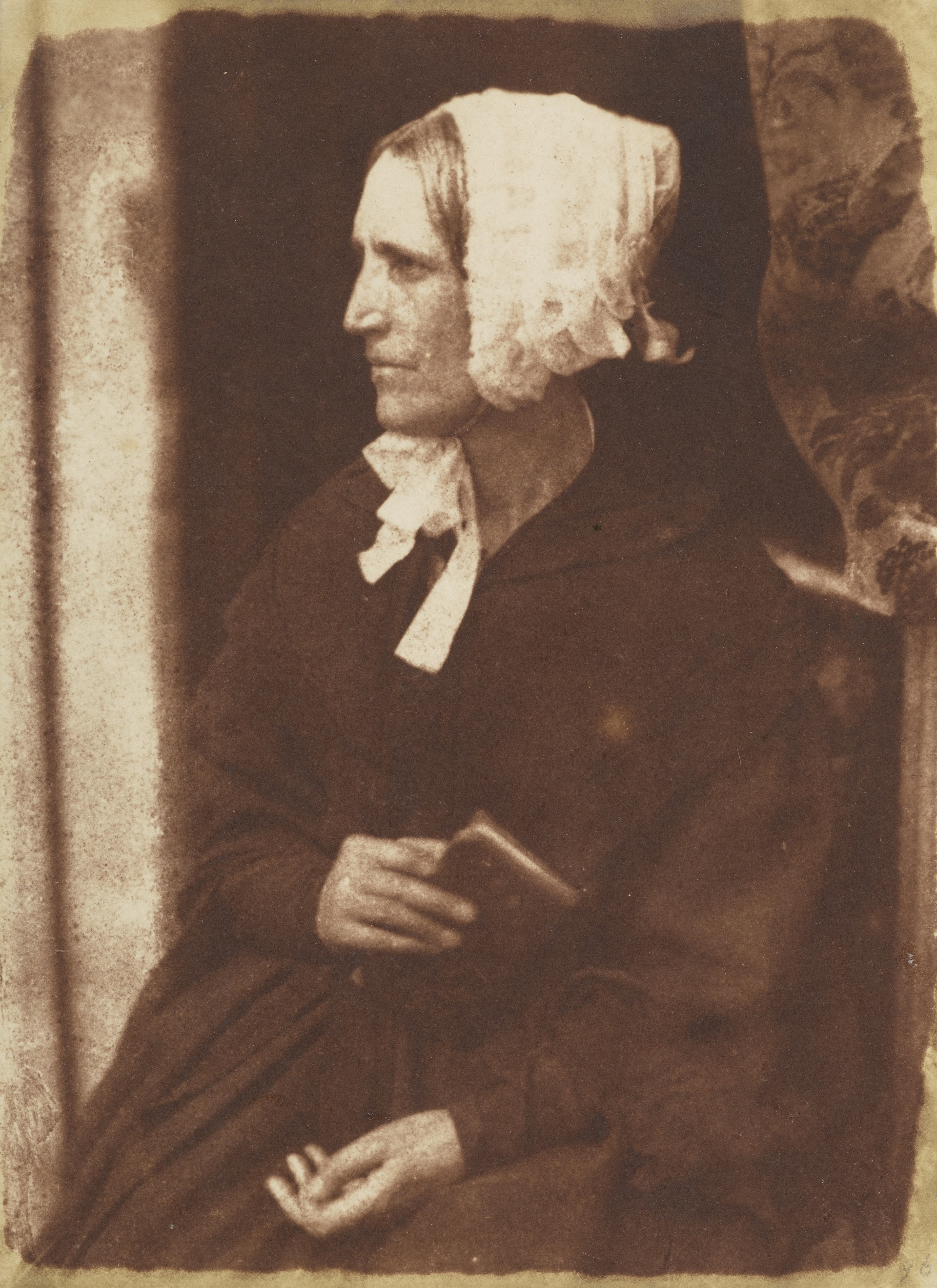
Mrs Mary Duncan wife of Henry Duncan

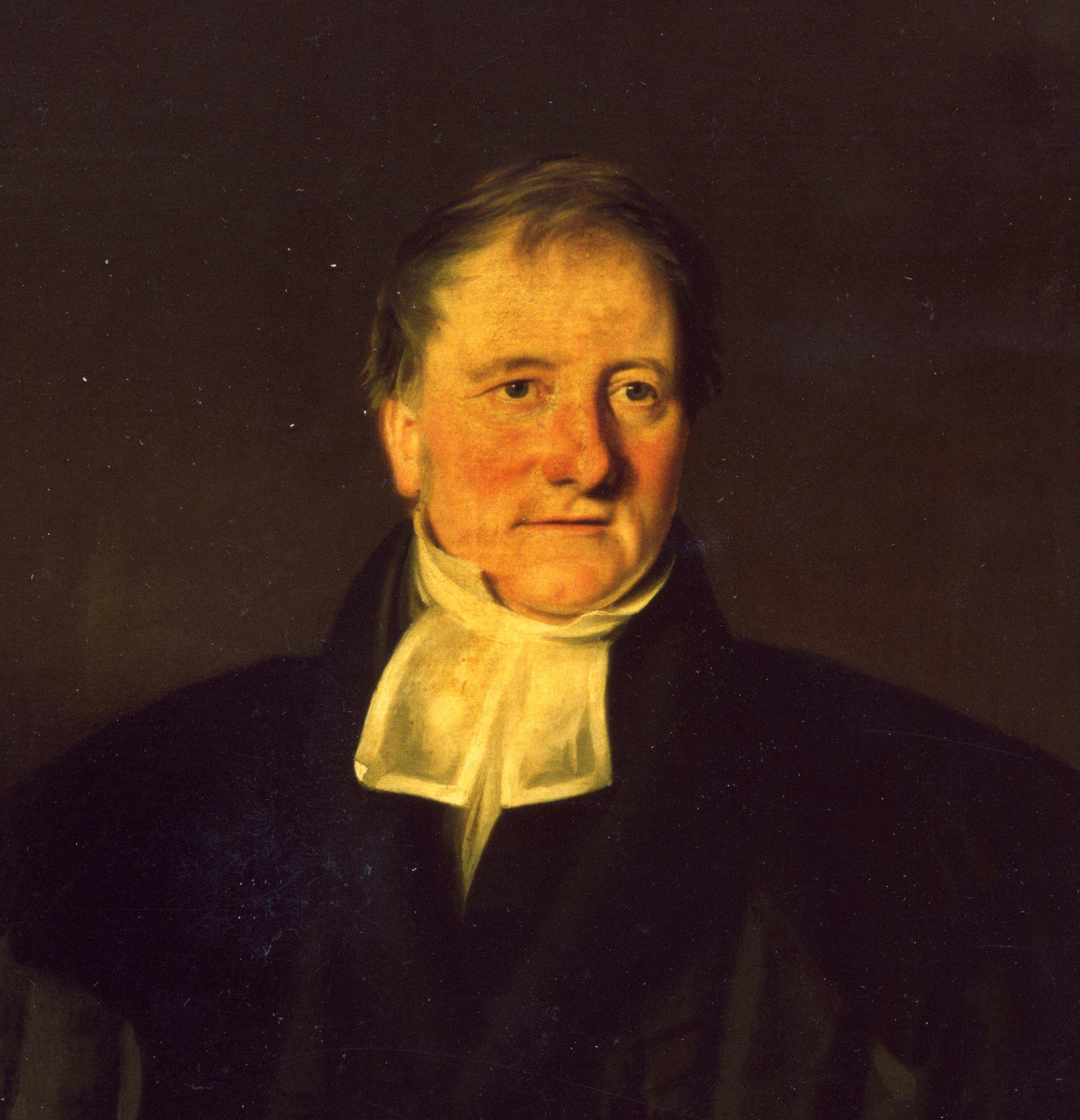
Henry Duncan in oil

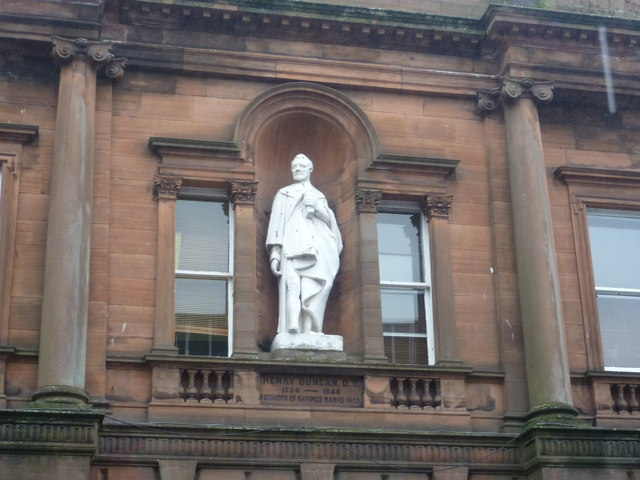
Henry Duncan statue, Church Crescent, Dumfries

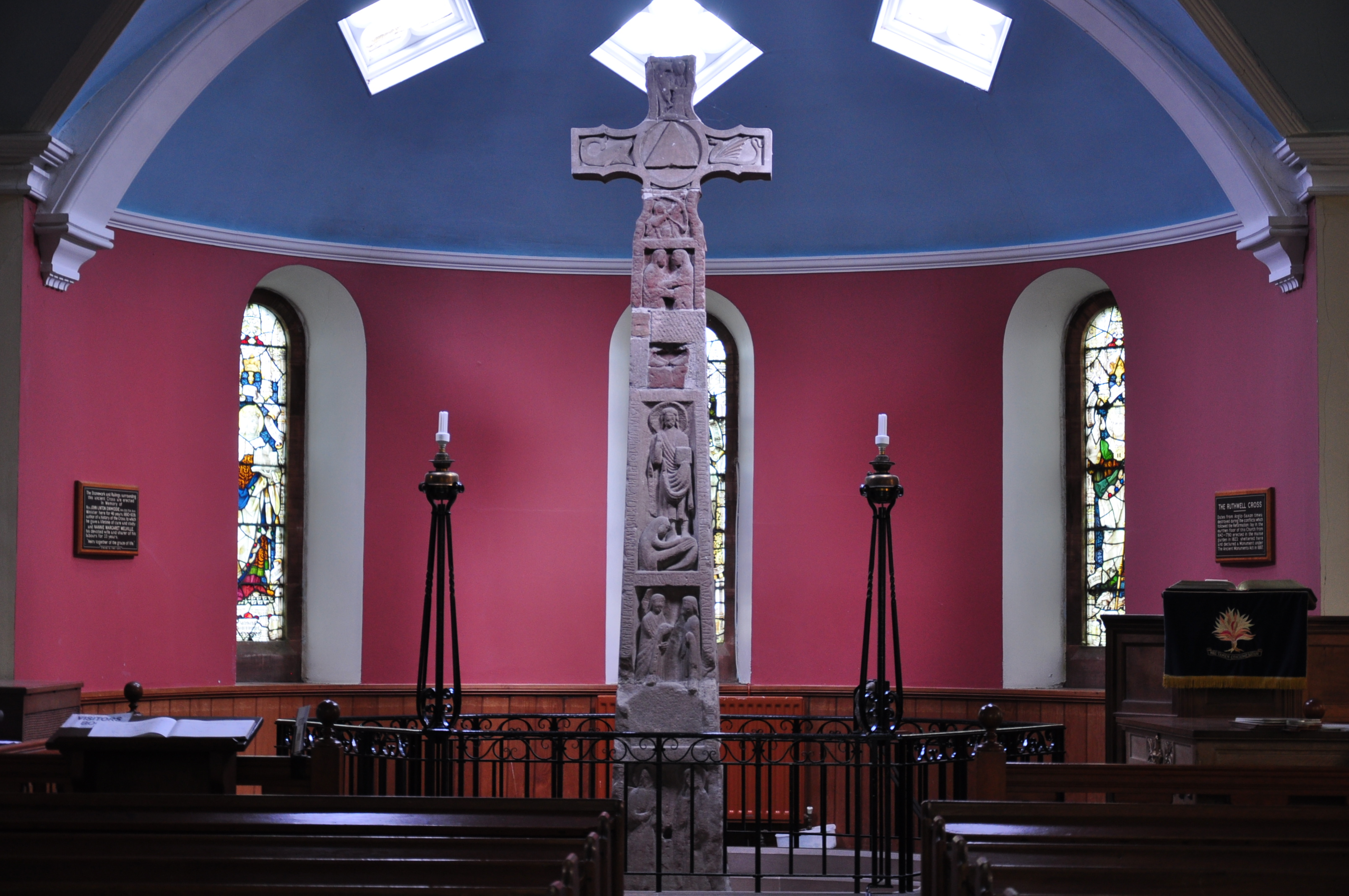
Ruthwell Cross South Face

Henry Duncan FRSE (8 October 1774 – 12 February 1846) was a Scottish minister, geologist and social reformer.

The minister of Ruthwell in Dumfriesshire, he founded the world's first mutual savings bank that would eventually form part of the Trustee Savings Bank. He served as moderator of the General Assembly of the Church of Scotland in 1839. At the Disruption of 1843, he left the Church of Scotland and sided with the Free Church. He was also a publisher, a philanthropist and an author, writing novels as well as works of science and religion.

== Early life ==
Duncan was born in 1774 at Lochrutton, Kirkcudbrightshire, where his father, George Duncan, was minister. As a boy, he met the poet Robert Burns, who visited Lochrutton Manse. Duncan was educated in Dumfries at the Dumfries Academy.

After studying for two sessions at St. Andrews University he was sent to Liverpool to begin commercial life, and under the patronage of his relative, Dr. James Currie (the biographer of Robert Burns), his prospects of success were very fair; but his heart was not in business, and he soon left Liverpool to study at Edinburgh and Glasgow for the ministry of the Church of Scotland.

Whilst in Edinburgh he joined The Speculative Society, and became intimate with the political figures, Francis Horner and Henry Brougham.

== Early ministry and works ==
In 1798, he was ordained as minister of the Church of Scotland and became Minister at Ruthwell in Dumfriesshire in 1799, where he spent the rest of his life. Duncan from the first was remarkable for the breadth of his views, especially in what concerned the welfare of the people, and the courage and ardour with which he promoted measures not usually thought to be embraced in the minister's rôle.

In a time of scarcity, he brought Indian corn from Liverpool. At the time when a French invasion was dreaded, he raised a company of volunteers, of which he was the captain.

He published a series of cheap popular tracts, contributing to the series some that were much prized, afterwards collected under the title The Cottage Fireside. He originated a newspaper, The Dumfries and Galloway Courier, of which he was editor for seven years.

== Savings banks ==
The measure which is most honourably connected with Duncan's name was the institution of savings banks. He is widely acknowledged to have formed the country's first savings bank in 1810 – the Ruthwell Parish Savings Bank – and Duncan was unceasing in his efforts to promote the cause throughout the country.

His influence was used to procure the first act of parliament passed to encourage such savings bank institutions. His messaging was spread through speeches, lectures and pamphlets. The system became very popular and remains in wide use to the present day. Although he dedicated a lot of time and energy to this cause, he never received any official reward or acknowledgement.

Although Duncan and the Ruthwell Savings Bank were hugely influential, the bank itself was not a great success. By 1875, only twenty-nine accounts remained, and these were transferred to Annan Savings Bank.

The bicentenary of this event was celebrated with a conference held by the Centre for Theology and Public Issues at the University of Edinburgh. Speakers investigated Duncan's legacy in light of current social, financial, and religious dynamics. The Savings Bank Museum tells the story of early home savings in Britain.

== Publishing ==
Duncan published some work anonymously. In 1821, he published another tale of humble Scottish life, The Young South-Country Weaver, a fit sequel to The Cottage Fireside.

In 1823, Duncan received a Doctor of Divinity degree from the University of St. Andrews.

A number of years later (1826), he published, anonymously, a work of fiction in three volumes, William Douglas; or, The Scottish Exiles, intended to counteract Sir Walter Scott's aspersions on the Covenanters in Scott's 1816 novel Old Mortality. This was hailed as a work of real genius, and was remarkably well received by the Scottish public.

In 1836, he published the first volume of a work which reached ultimately to four volumes, entitled The Sacred Philosophy of the Seasons. It was well received, and ran through several editions. He also contributed to Tales of the Scottish Peasantry by Henry Duncan, D.D., and others.

== Antiquarian and geological works ==
To the Transactions of the Scottish Antiquarian Society, he contributed a description of a celebrated runic cross: the Ruthwell Cross (now in Ruthwell church), one of the finest Anglo-Saxon crosses in Britain. This late 7th-/early 8th-century cross, which he discovered in his parish and restored in 1818, and on which volumes have since been written, is remarkable for its runic inscription, which contains excerpts from The Dream of the Rood, an Old English poem.

He made a memorable contribution likewise to geological science. In 1828, Duncan presented a paper to the Royal Society of Edinburgh describing the discovery of the fossil footmarks of four-legged vertebrate animals in the Permian red sandstone of Corncockle Quarry, near Lochmaben. The paper, published in 1831, was one of the first two scientific reports of a fossil track (the other being made by Mr. J. Grierson). Duncan also corresponded with the palaeontologist Rev William Buckland about the tracks. A cast of the tracks of Chelichnus duncani can be found in the National Museum of Scotland in Edinburgh. The original fossils can be seen at Dumfries Museum.

== Church parties and the Disruption ==
While at first not very decided between the moderate and the evangelical party in the church, Duncan soon sided with the latter, and became the intimate friend of such men as Dr. Thomas Chalmers and Dr. Andrew Thomson. In the earlier stages of the controversy connected with the Scottish church he addressed letters on the subject to his old college friends Lord Brougham and the Marquis of Lansdowne, and to Lord Melbourne, home secretary.

In 1839, Duncan became Moderator of the General Assembly of the Church of Scotland, and at the time of the Disruption of 1843 became one of the founding ministers of the Free Church of Scotland leaving a manse and grounds that had been rendered very beautiful by his taste and skill.

Duncan was visited by Robert Murray M'Cheyne during his vacations in Ruthwell.

Duncan was president of a Missionary Society. He also campaigned on behalf of Catholic Relief and on the Emancipation of Slaves.

== Family ==
Duncan's first wife, whom he married in November 1804, was Agnes Craig, daughter of his predecessor, the Rev. John Craig. They had two sons and a daughter. Agnes Duncan died of influenza in 1832.

Duncan's second wife, whom he married in 1836, was Mary Grey, daughter of George Grey of West Ord, sister of John Grey of Dilston, Northumberland, a well-known Northumbrian gentleman (see memoir by his daughter, Mrs. Josephine Butler) and Henry Grey (a minister), widow of the Rev. R. Lundie of Kelso, and mother of Mary Lundie Duncan and Jane Lundie Bonar. She was a lady of considerable accomplishments and force of character, and author of several books.

Duncan's son, George John Craig Duncan, was born in 1806. He became the minister at Kirkpatrick Durham. His wife was Isabelle Wight Duncan, who was a notable author.

His second son, William Wallace Duncan, born in 1808, was the minister of Cleish and husband of his step-sister Mary Lundie Duncan.

Henry Duncan's daughter, Barbara – referred to by Thomas Carlyle as "the bonny little Barbara Duncan" – married the Rev. James Dodds of Dunbar.

== Death and legacy ==
Duncan was a man of most varied accomplishments – manual, intellectual, social, and spiritual. With the arts of drawing, modelling, sculpture, landscape-gardening, and even the business of an architect, he was familiar, and his knowledge of literature and science was varied and extensive. In private and family life he was highly estimable, while his ministerial work was carried on with great earnestness and delight. The stroke of paralysis that ended his life on 19 February 1846 fell on him while conducting a religious service in the cottage of an elder.

The headquarters of TSB Bank (a descendant of the original Trustee Savings Bank) at 120 George Street is named Henry Duncan House.

== Selected publications ==
The following is a full list of Duncan's publications:

1. Pamphlet on Socinian controversy, Liverpool, 1791.
2. Three single sermons (Edinburgh, 1803–40)
3. Some Interesting Particulars of the Life and Character of Maitland Smith, who was executed in Dumfries for the Crimes of Robbery and Murder (Edinburgh, 1807)
4. The Scotch Cheap Repository (Dumfries, 1808; 2nd ed., 1815)
5. Rides and Regulations of Dumfries Parish Bank Friendly Society for Savings for the Industrious (Dumfries, 1815)
6. "Essay on Nature and Advantages of Parish Banks", 1815.
7. Letter to John H. Forbes, esq. [on parish banks, and in answer to his letter to editor of Quarterly Review], 1817.
8. "Letter to W. R. K. Douglas, Esquire, M.P., on Bill in Parliament for Savings Banks", 1819.
9. Letter to same advocating abolition of commercial restrictions, 1820.
10. Letter to Managers of Banks for Savings in Scotland.
11. The Cottage Fireside.
12. The Young South Country Weaver
13. "William Douglas, or the Scottish Exiles", 3 vols., 1826.
14. Letter to Parishioners of Ruthwell on Roman Catholic Emancipation, 1829.
15. 'Presbyter's Letters on the West India Question', 1830.
16. "Account of the remarkable Runic Monument preserved at Ruthwell Manse", 1833.
17. "Letters to Rev. Dr. George Cook on Patronage and Calls", 1834.
18. Sacred Philosophy of the Seasons, 4 vols., 1835–6.
19. Letter to his flock on the resolutions of the convocation, 1842.
20. Tales of the Scottish Peasantry [by Henry Duncan, D.D., and others] (Edinburgh, n.d.)
21. Articles in "Edinburgh Encyclopædia"—"Blair", "Blacklock", "Currie".
22. Account of tracks and footmarks of animals found in Corncockle Muir ('Transactions Royal Society of Edinburgh', xi.).
23. Many articles in Edinburgh Christian Instructor.
24. Account of the Parish (New Statistical Account, iv.).

== Notes ==
=== Sources ===
- Anderson, William (1877). "Duncan, Henry". The Scottish nation: or, The surnames, families, literature, honours, and biographical history of the people of Scotland. Vol. 2. A. Fullarton & co. p. 90-92.
- Blaikie, William Garden (1888). "Duncan, Henry". In Stephen, Leslie (ed.). Dictionary of National Biography. Vol. 16. London: Smith, Elder & Co. pp. 165–166.
- Chambers, Robert (1855). Thomson, Thomas (ed.). A biographical dictionary of eminent Scotsmen. New ed., rev. under the care of the publishers. With a supplementary volume, continuing the biographies to the present time. Vol. 8. Glasgow: Blackie. pp. 201-211.
- Dodds, James (1873). The Eminent Men of Dumfriesshire. A Lecture. Edinburgh: Maclaren & Macniven. p. 51.
- Dodds, James (1888). Personal reminiscences and biographical sketches. Edinburgh: MacNiven & Wallace. pp. 44-58.
- Duncan, Henry (1821). The Young South Country Weaver, Or, A Journey to Glasgow - A Tale for the Radicals; And, Maitland Smith, the Murderer : a True Narrative. Edinburgh: Waugh & Innes.
- Duncan, Henry (1821b). The Cottage Fireside. Edinburgh: Waugh & Innes.
- Duncan, Henry (1826a). William Douglas, or the Scottish Exiles. An historical novel. Vol. 1. Edinburgh: Oliver & Boyd.
- Duncan, Henry (1826b). William Douglas, or the Scottish Exiles. An historical novel. Vol. 2. Edinburgh: Oliver & Boyd.
- Duncan, Henry (1826c). William Douglas, or the Scottish Exiles. An historical novel. Vol. 3. Edinburgh: Oliver & Boyd.
- Duncan, Henry (1847a). Sacred philosophy of the seasons : illustrating the perfections of God in the phenomena of the year. Vol. 1. New York: R. Carter.
- Duncan, Henry (1847b). Sacred philosophy of the seasons : illustrating the perfections of God in the phenomena of the year. Vol. 2. New York: R. Carter.
- Duncan, Henry (1847c). Sacred philosophy of the seasons : illustrating the perfections of God in the phenomena of the year. Vol. 3. New York: R. Carter.
- Duncan, Henry (1847d). Sacred philosophy of the seasons : illustrating the perfections of God in the phenomena of the year. Vol. 4. New York: R. Carter.
- Duncan, Henry (1862). Tales of the Scottish peasantry, by H. Duncan and others. Edinburgh: William Oliphant and Co.
- Hall, Sophy (1910). Dr Duncan of Ruthwell, Founder of Saving's Banks, by his great Granddaughter. Edinburgh: Oliphant, Anderson and Ferrier.
- Mitchell, Rosemary (2004). "Duncan, Henry". Oxford Dictionary of National Biography (online ed.). Oxford University Press. doi:10.1093/ref:odnb/8217. (Subscription, Wikipedia Library access or UK public library membership required.)
- Scott, Hew (1917). Fasti ecclesiae scoticanae; the succession of ministers in the Church of Scotland from the reformation. Vol. 2. Edinburgh: Oliver and Boyd. pp. 255-256.
- Wylie, James Aitken, ed. (1881). Disruption worthies : a memorial of 1843, with an historical sketch of the free church of Scotland from 1843 down to the present time. Edinburgh: T. C. Jack. pp. 223–229.

=== References ===
- Duncan, George John C., Memoir of the Rev. Henry Duncan, D.D., Minister of Ruthwell, founder of savings banks, author of Sacred philosophy of the seasons, &c., &c.. – Edinburgh : London : W. Oliphant Hamilton, Adams, 1848.

Attribution

- This article incorporates text from a publication now in the public domain: Blaikie, William Garden (1888). "Duncan, Henry". In Stephen, Leslie (ed.). Dictionary of National Biography. Vol. 16. London: Smith, Elder & Co. pp. 165–166. Endnotes:
  - Life of Henry Duncan, D.D., by his son, Rev. G. J. C. Duncan
  - Pratt's Hist. of Savings Banks
  - Lewin's Hist. of Savings Banks
  - Notice of Dr. Duncan in Savings Bank Magazine, by John Maitland, esq., with note by Dr. Chalmers
