= Mary Lundie Duncan =

Scottish poet and hymnwriter

- Born: Mary Lundie; 26 April 1814; Kelso, Scottish Borders, Scotland
- Died: January 5, 1840 (aged 25); Edinburgh, Scotland
- Occupation: hymnwriter
- Spouse: W. Wallace Duncan (m. 1836),
- Children: 2
- Relatives: John Grey, Henry Grey, Jane Lundie Bonar, Henry Duncan
- Writing career
- Language: English
- Notable works: "Jesus, tender Shepherd, hear me"

Mary Lundie Duncan (26 April 1814 – 5 January 1840) was a Scottish poet and hymnwriter from Kelso, Scotland.

== Family ==
Mary Lundie Duncan was the eldest daughter of Rev. Robert Lundie, minister of Kelso, and Mary Grey. Her sister was the hymnwriter Jane Lundie Bonar. A brother, George Archibald Lundie, went with a missionary band to Samoa, hoping that the climate might restore his failing health, but died in less than three years. There were two other brothers, Cornelius, engineer and railway manager of a branch in South Wales, and Robert, minister of the Presbyterian Church, Fairfield, Liverpool.

Born in the old manse by the River Tweed, located by the Abbey, she spent her early years in Kelso. At the age of 16, sent to school in London. During her time in London, she attended meetings of religious societies, hearing from some of the great philanthropists of the era such as William Wilberforce, Henry Brougham and Charles Buxton.

Upon her father’s death in April 1832, the family left the manse in Kelso, and moved to Edinburgh. She joined the congregation of her uncle Dr. Henry Grey who had an influence upon her spiritual views.

In 1834 she became engaged to Rev. W. Wallace Duncan (1888, p. 65), the youngest son of Rev. Henry Duncan, D.D., founder of the Savings Bank movement and minister in Ruthwell and also the second husband of Mary’s mother, Mary Grey. W. Wallace Duncan became minister of Cleish, Kinross-shire. They married in July 1836. As a minister’s wife, Duncan carried out parochial work such as visiting the poor and teaching classes to young girls. The couple had two children – Mary (married to Rev. Alex. Campbell of Lockerbie) and Henry (a minister of the Spanish Protestant Church).

== Death ==
In December 1839 Duncan developed a chill which resulted in a brief illness. She died on 5 January 1840.

After her death, her mother Mary Grey published a biography Memoir of Mrs. Mary Lundie Duncan, which included passages of Duncan’s diaries, correspondence and poems. The American Tract Society published an abridged version in 1851 which caused some discussion as it omitted Duncan’s views on the abolition of slavery and infant baptism.

Duncan is buried in the graveyard at Cleish parish church, where there is also a plaque dedicated to her in the chancel. It was at the Cleish manse that Duncan wrote the hymn Jesus, tender Shepherd, hear me.

== Works ==
Duncan wrote poetry and hymns for her children. Some of her works are published in the Memoir by her mother and in posthumous collection, Rhymes for my children (1842).

Duncan also contributed an article The orphan's stay to The Christian keepsake and missionary annual, 1835. (1835)

Jesus, tender Shepherd, hear me

Jesus, tender Shepherd, hear me,

Bless Thy little lamb tonight;

Through the darkness be Thou near me,

Watch my sleep till morning light...
