= Charles Callahan Perkins =

American art critic

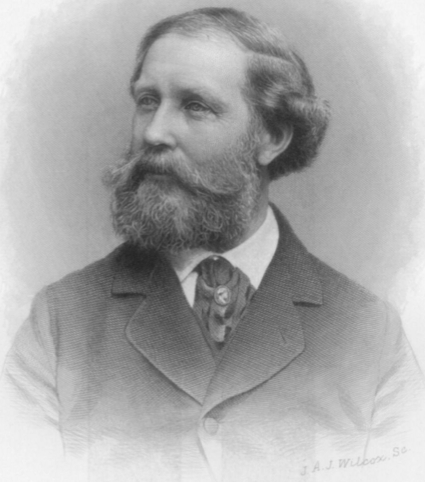
Portrait of Charles C. Perkins, 19th century

Charles Callahan Perkins (March 1, 1823 – August 25, 1886) was an art critic, writer, organizer of cultural activities, and an influential friend of design and of music in Boston.

== Biography ==
Charles C. Perkins was born in Boston on March 1, 1823, to James and Eliza Greene (Callahan) Perkins. His father, descended from Edmund Perkins who emigrated to New England in 1650, was a wealthy and philanthropic merchant. The family was wealthy. Perkins was the great nephew of Thomas Handasyd Perkins, who founded the Perkins shipping empire J. & T.H Perkins with Charles' grandfather James.

Perkins attended several schools before entering Harvard College, where he found the prescribed academic course irksome. He graduated in 1843. He had previously drawn and painted and went abroad soon after graduation to study art. In Rome he became friendly with and encouraged the sculptor Thomas Crawford, then struggling economically. In 1846, Perkins took a studio at Paris, where he had instruction from Ary Scheffer. Later he pursued studies in the history of Christian art in Leipzig. Returning to Paris he took up etching with Bracquemond and Lalanne. He made many etchings to illustrate his own books.

Perkins, independently wealthy, devoted his life to interpreting the art of others. In 1850-51 and from 1875 until his death he was president of the Handel and Haydn Society, Boston, and sometimes conducted their concerts and wrote music the ensemble performed. (The German publisher Breitkopf and Härtel, the world's oldest music publishing house, issued Perkins's Piano Trio and two string quartets in 1854 and 1855 respectively; Perkins's compositions were the first works by an American ever published by that firm.) He married on June 12, 1855, Frances Davenport Bruen, daughter of the Rev. Matthias Bruen, of New York. They gave many concerts and recitals at their home. Perkins was the largest subscriber to the construction of the Boston Music Hall, for which he also contributed the great bronze statue of Beethoven, modeled by his friend Crawford, which since 1902 has stood in the entrance hall of the New England Conservatory of Music, Boston. An invitation extended to Perkins in 1857 to give some lectures at Trinity College, Hartford, on "The Rise and Progress of Painting," started him as a lecturer.

After another European sojourn ended in 1869, he lectured frequently on Greek and Roman art before Boston school teachers, and on sculpture and painting at the Lowell Institute. he served for thirteen years on the Boston school committee. He brought to Boston the South Kensington methods of teaching drawing and design to children, and he was instrumental in founding the Massachusetts Normal Art School, now the Massachusetts College of Art and Design. As a committeeman he was also assigned the third division of the school system, comprising the North and West Ends. He took pains to know personally all teachers of his division, often entertaining them at his home.

Prior to 1850, Perkins had proposed an art museum for Boston but had found the plan premature. When others revived this project twenty years later he supported it. He was second among the incorporators of the Museum of Fine Arts, secured for its opening a gift of Egyptian antiquities, and made valuable suggestions for arranging its exhibits. He advocated showing contemporary work as well as the arts of antiquity. He was also elected president of the Boston Art Club, a post he held for ten years. He systematically devoted part of each day to writing Tuscan Sculptors, published in London in 1864, which brought him a European reputation. It was followed in 1868 by Italian Sculptors, with illustrations drawn and etched by the author. He edited, with notes, Charles Locke Eastlake's Hints on Household Taste (1872), Art in Education (1870), Art in the House (1879) from the original of Jakob von Falke, and Sepulchral Monuments in Italy (1885).

In 1878 he brought out, with illustrative woodcuts which he had designed, Raphael and Michaelangelo, dedicated to Henry W. Longfellow, and included Longfellow's previously unpublished translations of the sculptor's sonnets. His Historical Handbook of Italian Sculpture appeared in 1883, and in 1886, in French, Ghiberti et son École. At the time of his death he had nearly finished his closely documented History of the Handel and Haydn Society of Boston, Massachusetts, which others completed. He was also critical editor of the Cyclopedia of Painters and Paintings, edited by Champlin.

He was the grandfather of editor Maxwell Perkins and the great-grandfather of Archibald Cox. Perkins died on August 25, 1886, in Windsor, Vermont in a carriage accident while he was driving with U.S. Senator William M. Evarts of New York.

== Sources ==
- "Charles Callahan Perkins. "Dictionary of American Biography Base Set. American Council of Learned Societies, 1928-1936.
