= David Lamont (moderator) =

Church of Scotland minister

David Lamont of Erncrogo and Culshand (1753–1837) was a Church of Scotland minister, who served as Moderator of the General Assembly in 1822. He was Chaplain in Ordinary to King George IV from 1821. At his death he was a Father of the Church.

== Life ==
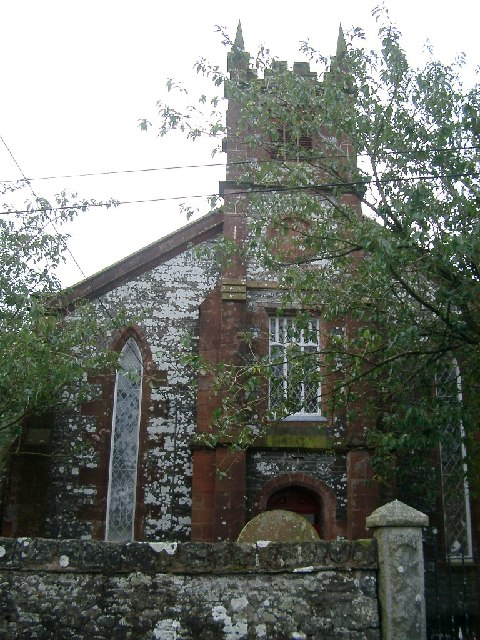
Kirkpatrick Durham Parish Church

He was born on 20 April 1753 the son of Margaret (d.1795), daughter of John Affleck of Whitepark, and Rev John Lamont (1700–1776) minister of Kelton in Kirkcudbrightshire. He was licensed to preach by the Presbytery of Kirkcudbright in May 1772. He was presented to the congregation of Kilpatrick by King George III in January 1774 and ordained there in August 1774. He spent his entire lifetime in this role. In June 1780 the University of Edinburgh awarded him an honorary Doctor of Divinity. In 1785 he became private Chaplain to George, Prince of Wales. In 1785 in his parish he founded the new village of Kirkpatrick Durham by feuing his own land and selling plots for cottages very cheaply.

In 1822 he succeeded Duncan Mearns as Moderator of the General Assembly of the Church of Scotland the highest position in the Scottish church.

In his capacity as Moderator he preached to King George IV in St Giles Cathedral during the King's visit of 1822. In 1824 he was created a Chaplain in Ordinary to the King.

He died a Father of the Church on 7 January 1837, aged 83.

== Family ==
He married Anne Anderson (d. 1857) daughter of David Anderson, Examiner of Customs in Scotland. Their only child John Lamont (1805-1873) was an advocate then a brewer in London, and died in Wangaratta, Australia.
