= Horatius Bonar =

Scottish churchman and poet

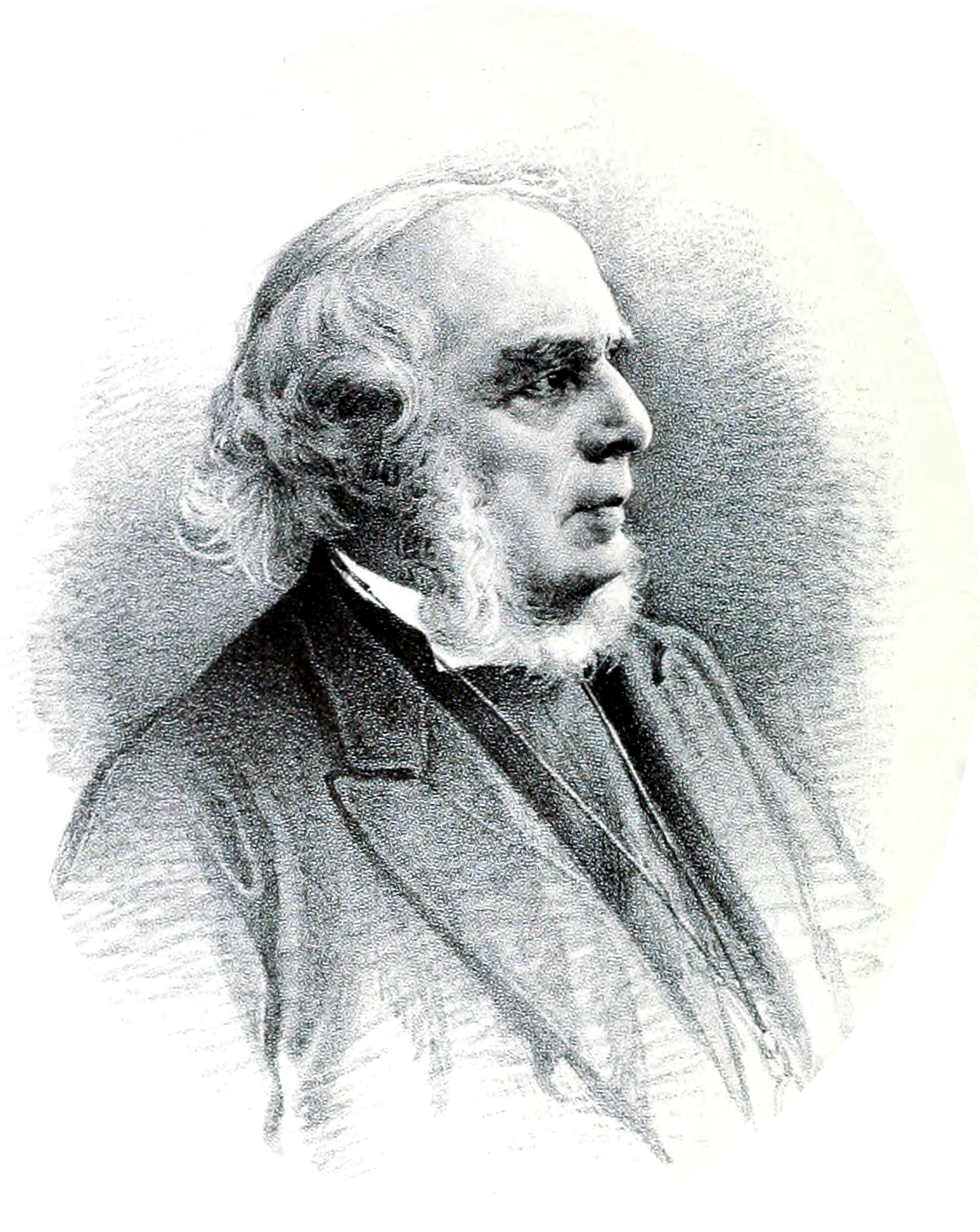
- Horatius Bonar from Disruption Worthies

Personal details
- Born: 19 December 1808
- Died: 31 July 1889 (aged 80)
- Occupation: churchman, poet

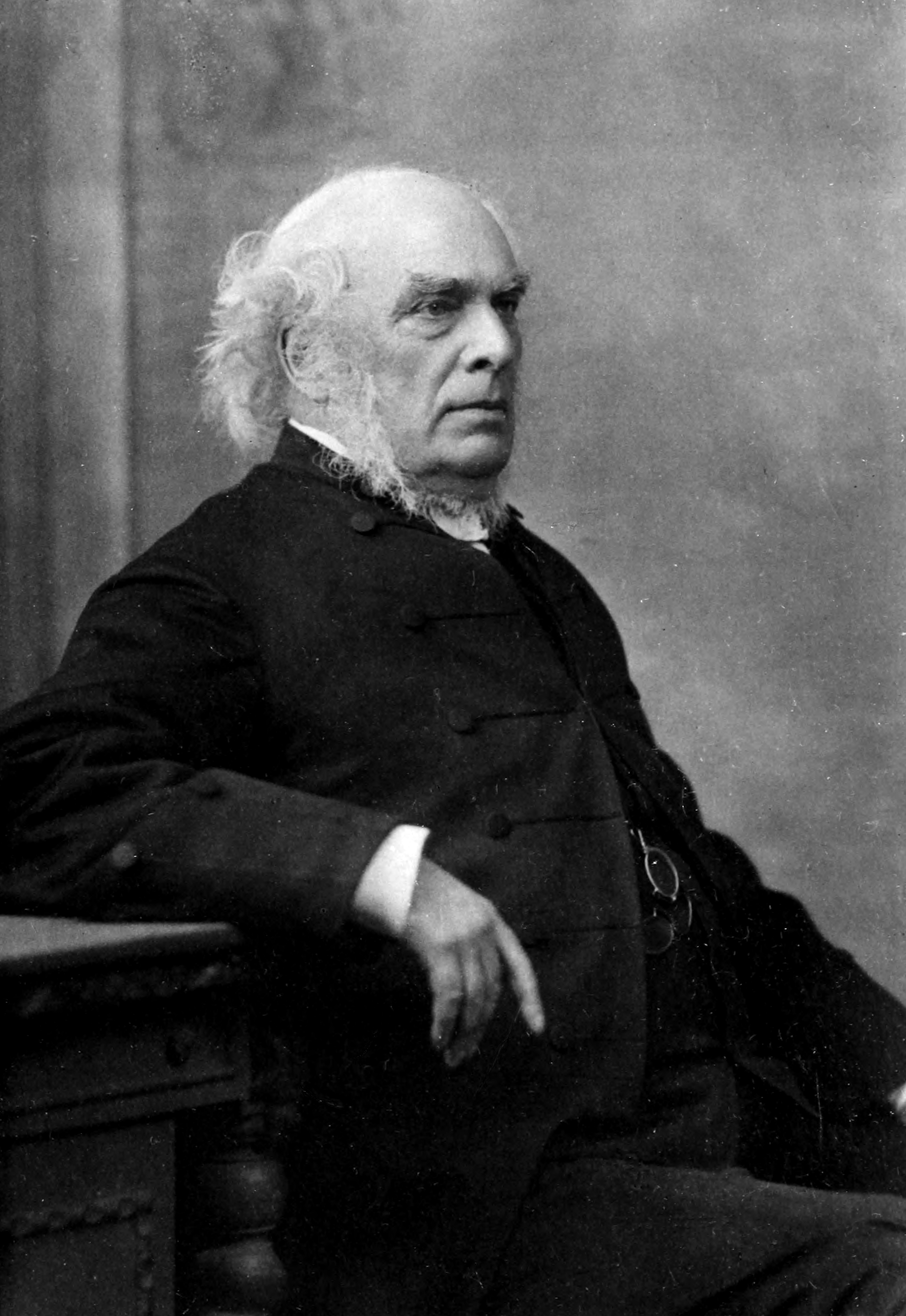
Horatius Bonar from memorial

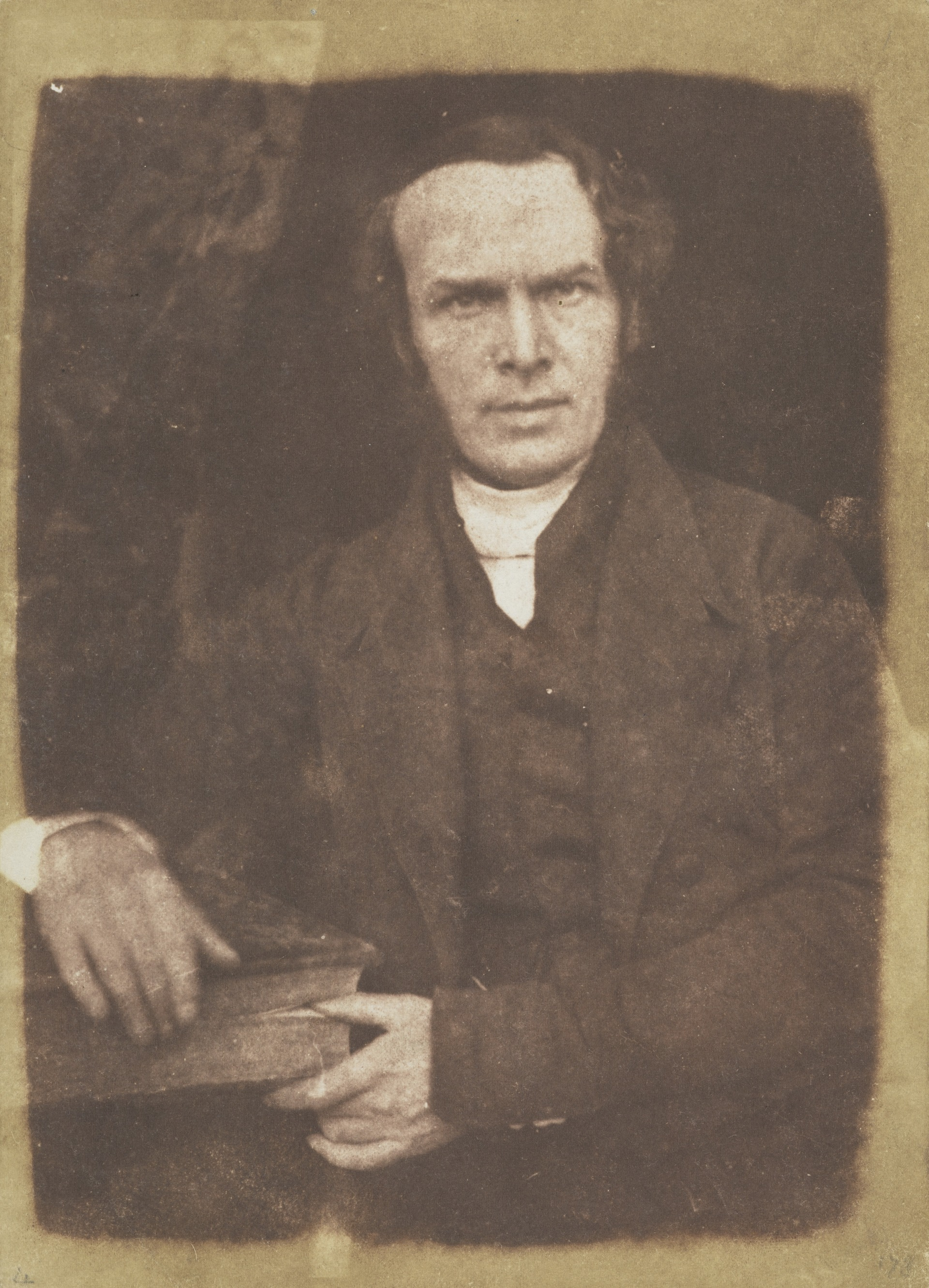
Horatius Bonar by Robert Adamson & David Octavius Hill 1808 - 1889. Of Kelso and Edinburgh; Free Church minister and poet

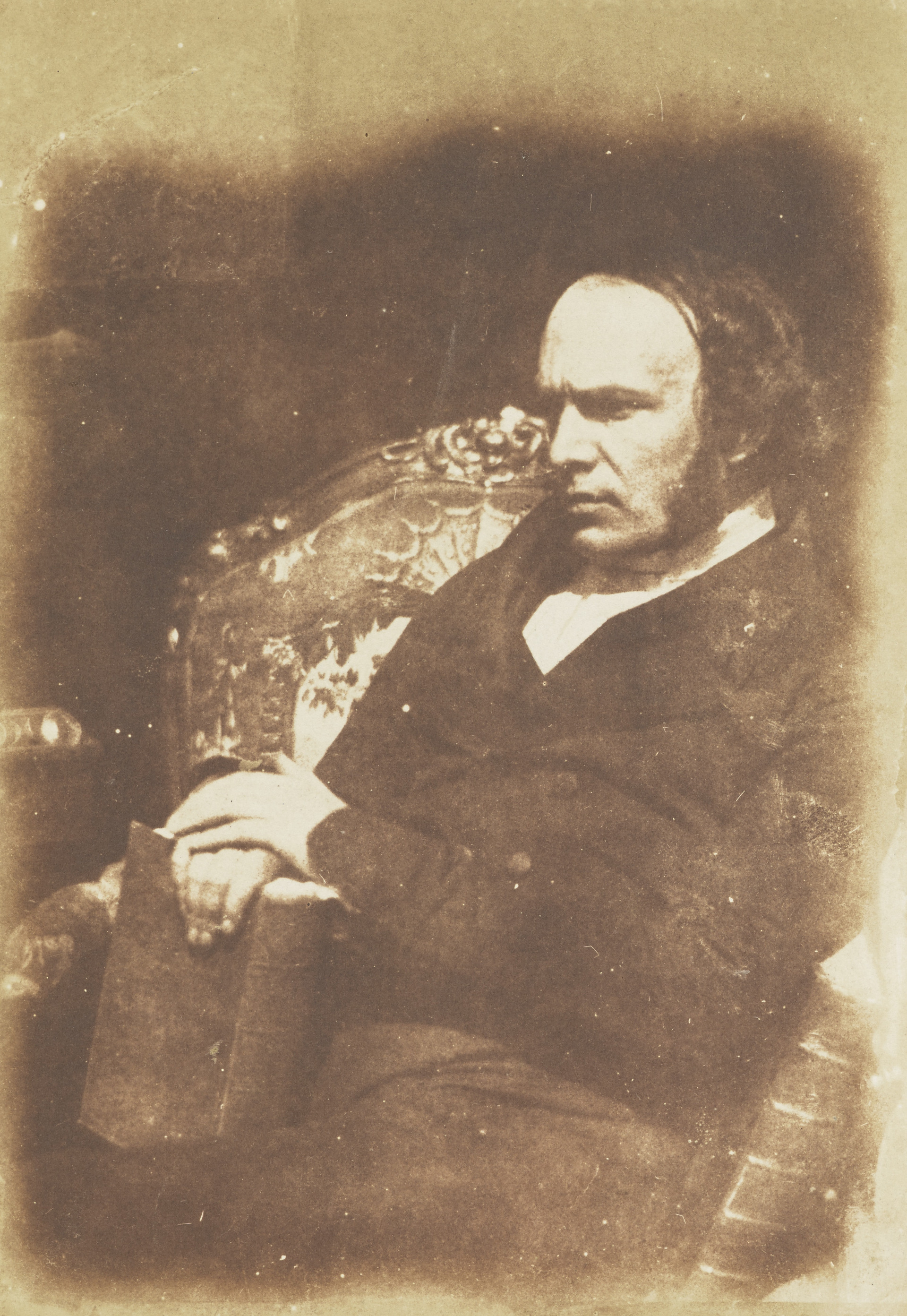
Robert Adamson & David Octavius Hill - Rev. Dr Horatius Bonar, 1808 - 1889. Of Kelso and Edinburgh; Free Church minister and poet

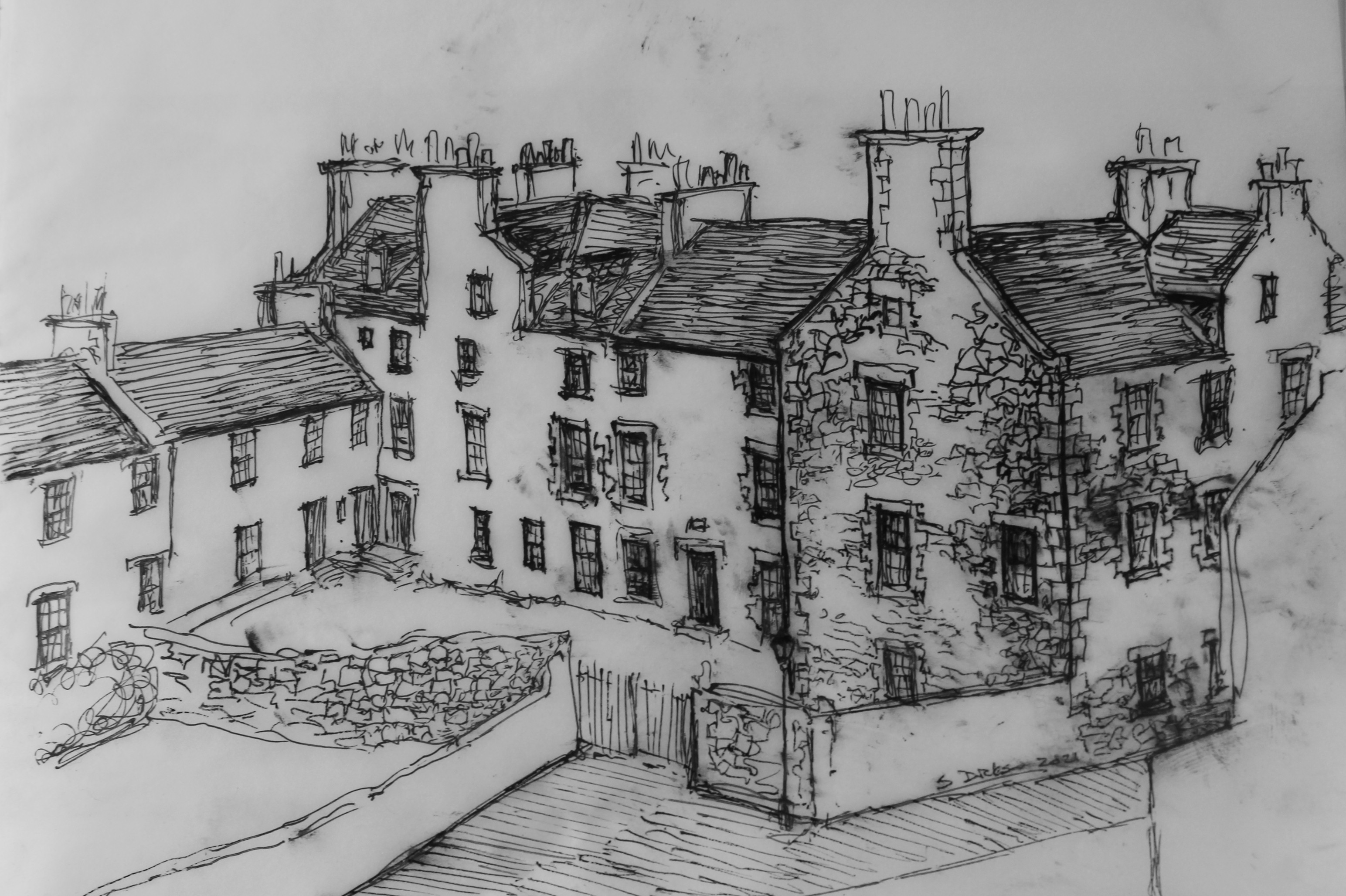
Paterson's Yard, Broughton, Edinburgh c. 1850

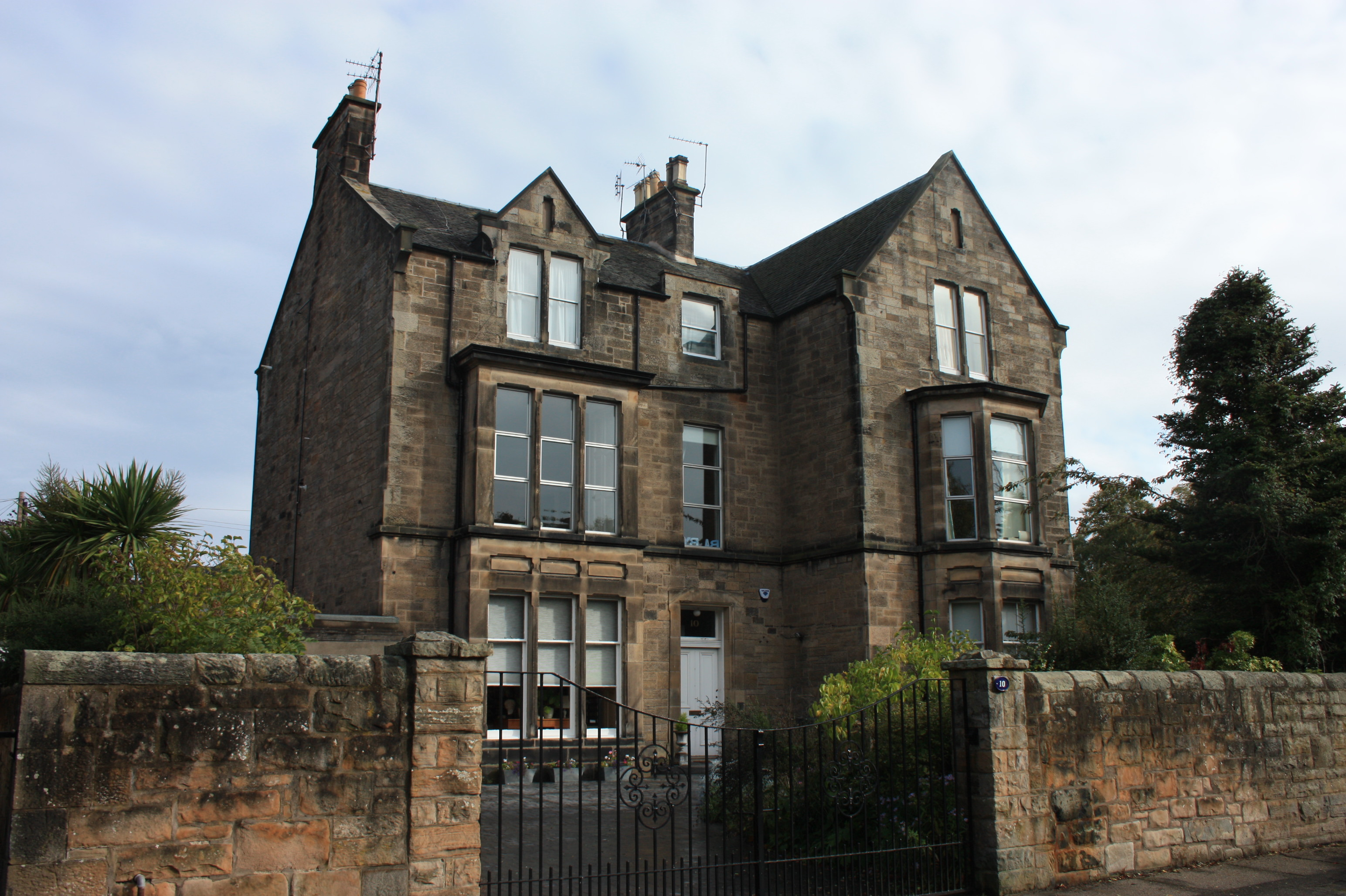
10 Palmerston Road, Edinburgh

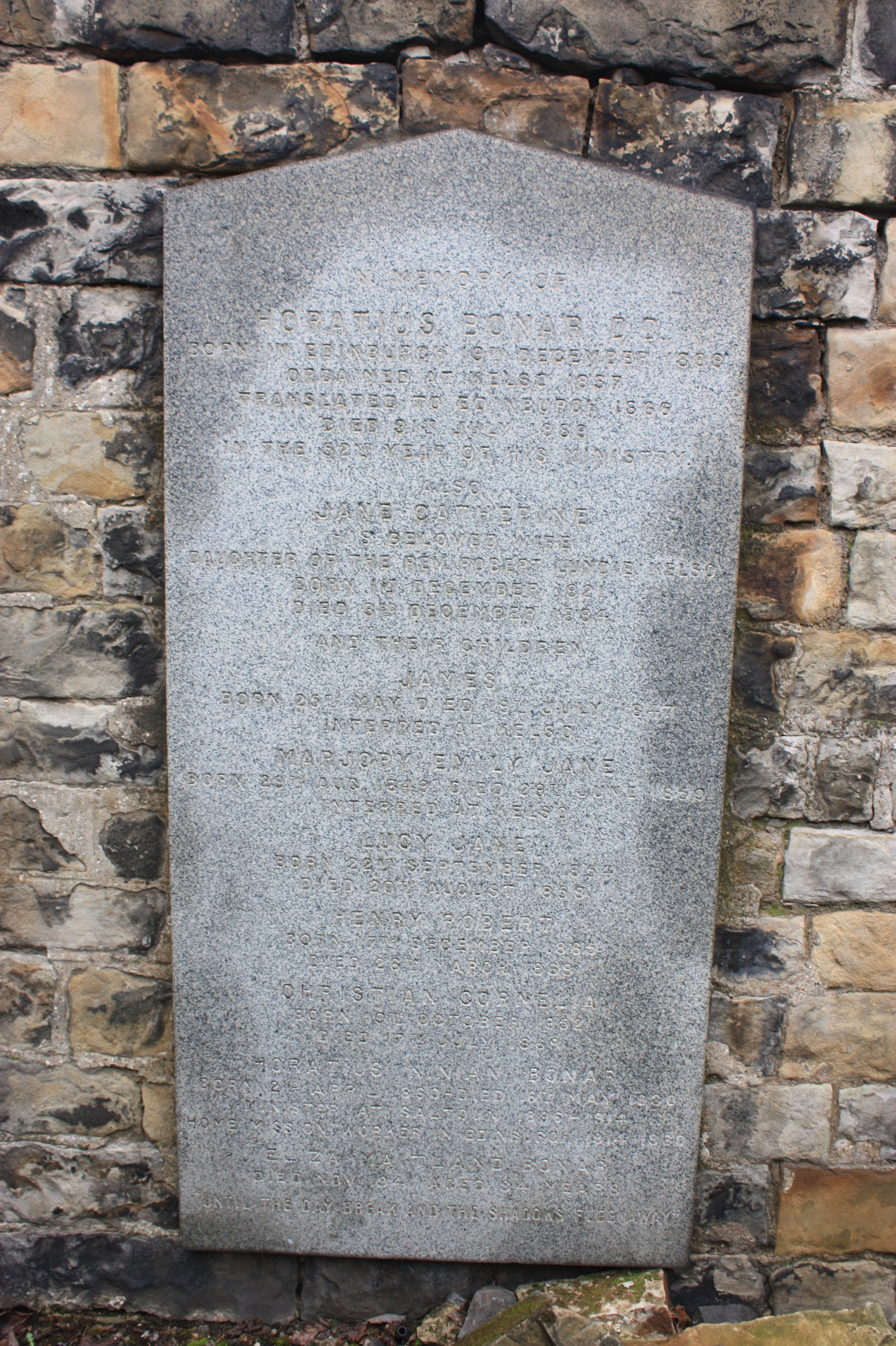
The grave of Horatius Bonar, Canongate Kirkyard

Horatius Bonar (/həˈreɪʃəs ˈbɒnˌɑːr, ˈbɒnər/; 19 December 1808 – 31 July 1889) was a Scottish churchman and poet is principally remembered as a prodigious hymnodist. Friends knew him as Horace Bonar. Licensed as a preacher, he did mission work in Leith for a time, and in November 1837 he settled at Kelso as minister of the new North Church founded in connection with Thomas Chalmers's scheme of church extension. He became exceedingly popular as a preacher, and was soon well known throughout Scotland.

== Life ==
He was the son of James Bonar (1758–1821), Solicitor of Excise for Scotland, and his wife Marjory Pyott Maitland. The family lived in the Broughton district of Edinburgh.

He came from a long line of ministers who served a total of 364 years in the Church of Scotland. One of eleven children, his brothers John James and Andrew Alexander were also ministers of the Free Church of Scotland. Horatius studied Divinity at University of Edinburgh and was ordained as a minister for the Church of Scotland in 1838 at the North Church in Kelso. In the Disruption of 1843 he left the established church and joined the Free Church of Scotland. In 1866 he moved to the newly built Chalmers Memorial Church in Edinburgh.

He married Jane Catherine Lundie in 1843 and five of their (nine) young children died in succession. Towards the end of their lives, one of their surviving daughters was left a widow with five small children and she returned to live with her parents.

In 1853, Bonar received an honorary Doctor of Divinity degree from the University of Aberdeen.

He died at this home, 10 Palmerston Road in The Grange, Edinburgh, 31 July 1889. They are buried together in the Canongate Kirkyard in the lair of Alexander Bonar (and his parents), near the bottom of the eastern extension.

== Family ==
He married 16 August 1843, Jane Catherine (died 3 December 1884), third daughter of Robert Lundie, minister of Kelso, and had issue —

- Mary Lundie, born 14 June 1844 (married 29 August 1876, George Theophilus Dodds, M'All Mission, Paris)
- James, born 25 May, died 19 July 1847
- Marjory Emily Jane, born 29 August 1849, died 28 June 1850
- Christian Cornelia, born 10 October 1852, died 17 July 1869
- Lucy Jane, born 22 September 1854, died 20 August 1858
- Eliza Maitland, born 10 September 1857
- Horatius Ninian, sometime minister of United Free Church, Saltoun, born 2 April 1860
- Emily Florence, born 26 December 1861 (married 2 August 1894, Duncan Clark MacNicol, minister of Stockbridge United Free Church, Edinburgh)
- Henry Robert, born 17 December 1865, died 26 March 1869.

He was brother to the Rev. John James Bonar of Greenock (1803–1891).

== Service ==
He entered the Ministry of the Church of Scotland. At first he was put in charge of mission work at St John's parish in Leith and settled at Kelso. He joined the Free Church at the time of the Disruption of 1843, and in 1867 was moved to Edinburgh to take over the Chalmers Memorial Church (named after his teacher at college, Thomas Chalmers). In 1883, he was elected Moderator of the General Assembly of the Free Church of Scotland.

== Works ==
He was a voluminous and highly popular author. He also served as the editor for The Quarterly Journal of Prophecy from 1848 to 1873 and for the Christian Treasury from 1859 to 1879. In addition to many books and tracts was a prolific hymnodist; many of his hymns, e.g., "I heard the voice of Jesus say" and "Blessing and Honour and Glory and Power," became known all over the English-speaking world. A selection of these was published as Hymns of Faith and Hope (3 series). His last volume of poetry was My Old Letters. Bonar was also author of several biographies of ministers he had known, including The Life of the Rev. John Milne of Perth in 1869, and in 1884 The Life and Works of the Rev. G. T. Dodds, who was married to Bonar's daughter and who died in 1882 while serving as a missionary in France.

His hymns, which number over 140, include:

- All Praise to Him Who Built the Hills
- All That I Was
- Fill thou my life, O Lord, my God
- I heard the Voice of Jesus say
- I Was a Wandering Sheep
- Thy way, not mine, O Lord
- Not What I Am, O Lord, but What Thou Art
- Here, O my Lord, I see Thee face to face
- A few more years shall roll
- Come Lord and tarry not
- O love of God, how strong and true
- Go, Labour on: Spend and Be Spent

Some of his books include:

- Words to Winners of Souls. Nabu Press. 2011. ISBN 978-1-24772-723-3.
- The Everlasting Righteousness. Banner of Truth. 1996. ISBN 978-0-85151-655-4.
- God's Way of Holiness. Christian Focus Publications. 1999. ISBN 978-1-85792-503-6.
- How Shall I Go to God. Baker Book House. 1977. ISBN 978-0-8010-0713-2.
- Night of Weeping. Christian Focus Publications. 1999. ISBN 978-1-85792-441-1.
- God's Way of Peace. ISBN 1-4590-9630-4
- Follow the Lamb. ISBN 0-906731-63-1
- Light & Truth: Bible Thoughts and Themes on The Acts & Larger Epistles. – commentary on Acts, Romans, and 1 Corinthians and 2 Corinthians ASIN B002ZJRS9K
- Light & Truth: Bible Thoughts and Themes on Revelation. – commentary on the Book of Revelation ASIN B002ZRQ55U
