= Isabelle Wight Duncan =

Scottish author and evolutionary theorist (1812–1878)

Isabelle Duncan
- Born: 2 July 1812; Dumfries, Scotland
- Died: 26 December 1878 (aged 66); Bayswater, London, England
- Known for: Theological Theories
- Notable work: Pre-Adamite man : or, the story of our old planet & its inhabitants, told by Scripture & science

Isabelle Duncan (2 July 1812 – 26 December 1878) was a British author known for her book which explained scientific theories in terms of the accounts known from the Bible.

== Life and Career ==
=== Career ===
Isabelle Wight was born on 2 July 1812 in Dumfries, Scotland.. She wrote a book, Pre-Adamite man : or, the story of our old planet & its inhabitants, told by Scripture & science, about the creation which combined scientific theories with the stories from Genesis in the Bible. This pre-Adamite theory postulated a race of people before Adam, and also explained the origin of angels. The book was published just after Darwin published On the Origin of Species and after the evidence that mammoths and humans lived at the same time. At that time, the Bible gave evidence that the earth was thousands and not millions of years old. She explained the recent findings from geology but surmising that chapter one of Genesis described a race before Adam and the second chapter described the classical story of biblical creation.

Her husband, a minister, did not agree with the main idea of her book, but he offered his expertise with theology and created some illustrations. This was uncredited as the book went through many editions by an unknown author.

Isabelle was annoyed that the author was assumed to be male. For later editions, it was published under her name.

=== Personal life and death ===
She married George John Craig Duncan, a was minister of Kirkpatrick Durham, whose father was Scottish banker, minister and social reformer Henry Duncan. She relocated to London with her husband and bore nine children. Duncan died in Bayswater, London on 26 December 1878.
