= William MacMorine =

William MacMorine (1756–1832) was a Church of Scotland minister, who served as Moderator of the General Assembly in 1812.

== Life ==
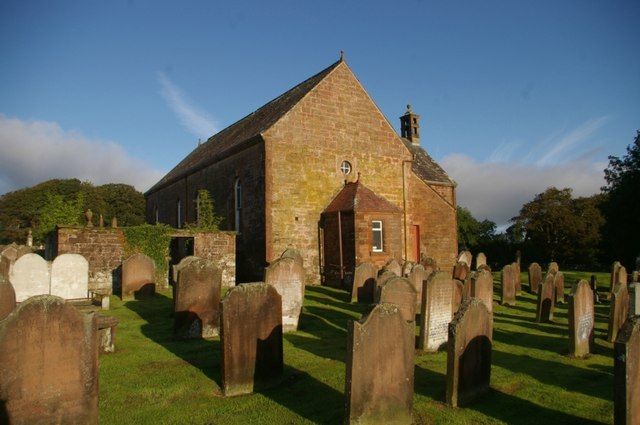
Caerlaverock Parish Church of Scotland

He was born on 7 May 1756 in the manse at Kirkpatrick Durham the son of Robert MacMorine, the parish minister. He studied divinity at the University of Edinburgh and was licensed to preach by the Presbytery of Kirkcudbright in February 1791.

In March 1784, he was presented to the congregation of Caerlaverock Parish Church under the patronage of William Duke of Queensberry in place of James Kilpatrick. He was accepted by the congregation and ordained as their minister in August 1784. He spent his entire 48-year-career in this position.

In December 1793 he was the minister called to Alloway by Robert Burns to christen his illegitimate daughter, Elizabeth Riddell, a task which most ministers resisted.

In 1811 the University of Edinburgh awarded him an honorary Doctor of Divinity. In 1812 he succeeded Alexander Ranken as Moderator of the General Assembly of the Church of Scotland the highest position in the Scottish church.

He died in Caerlaverock manse on 3 November 1832. His position at Caerlaverock was filled by Robert Gillies.

== Publications ==
- Account of the Parish of Caerlaverock
