= Cleish =

Village in Perth and Kinross, Scotland, UK

Coordinates: 56.167°N 3.459°W

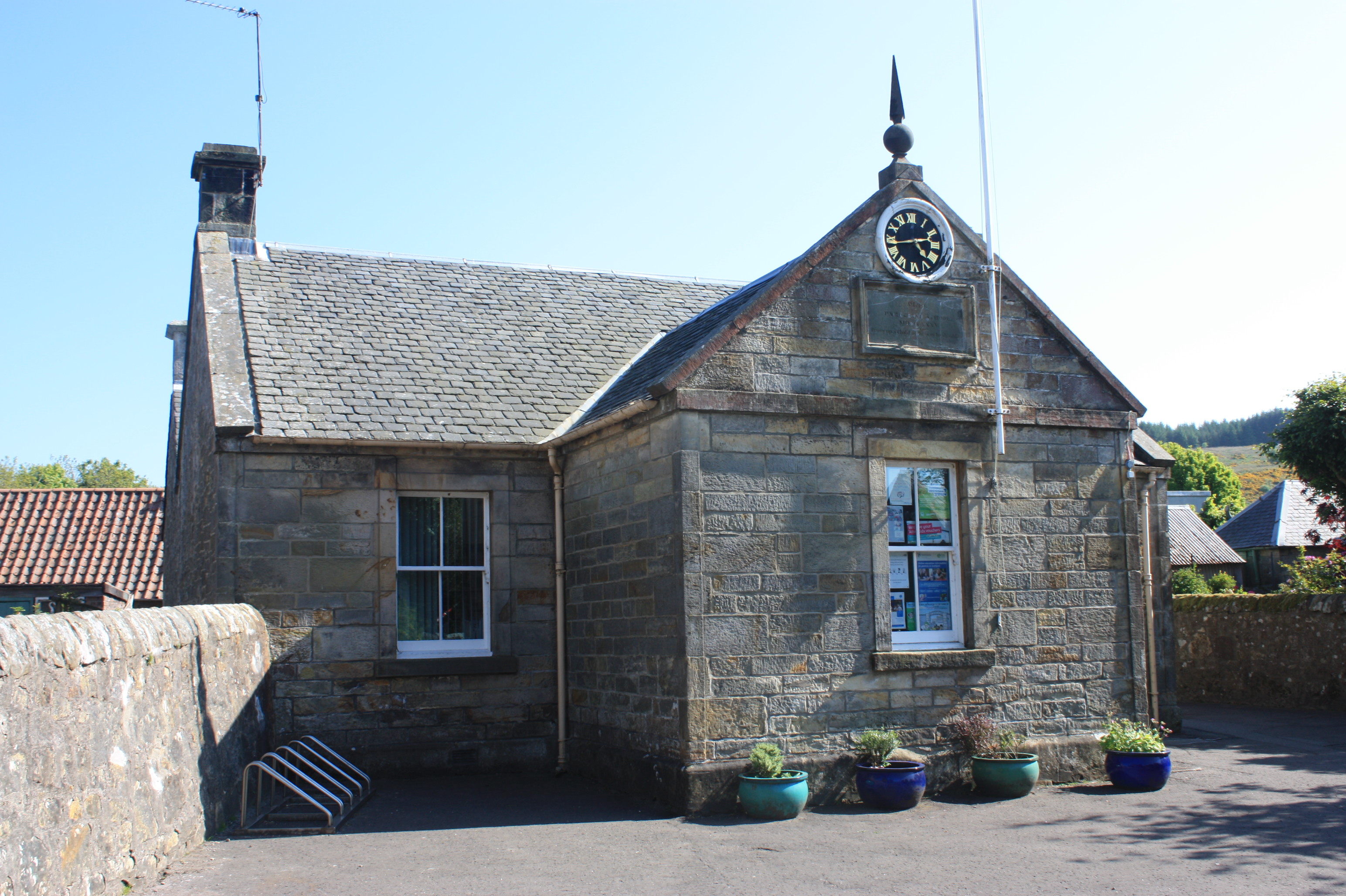
Cleish Parish School 1835

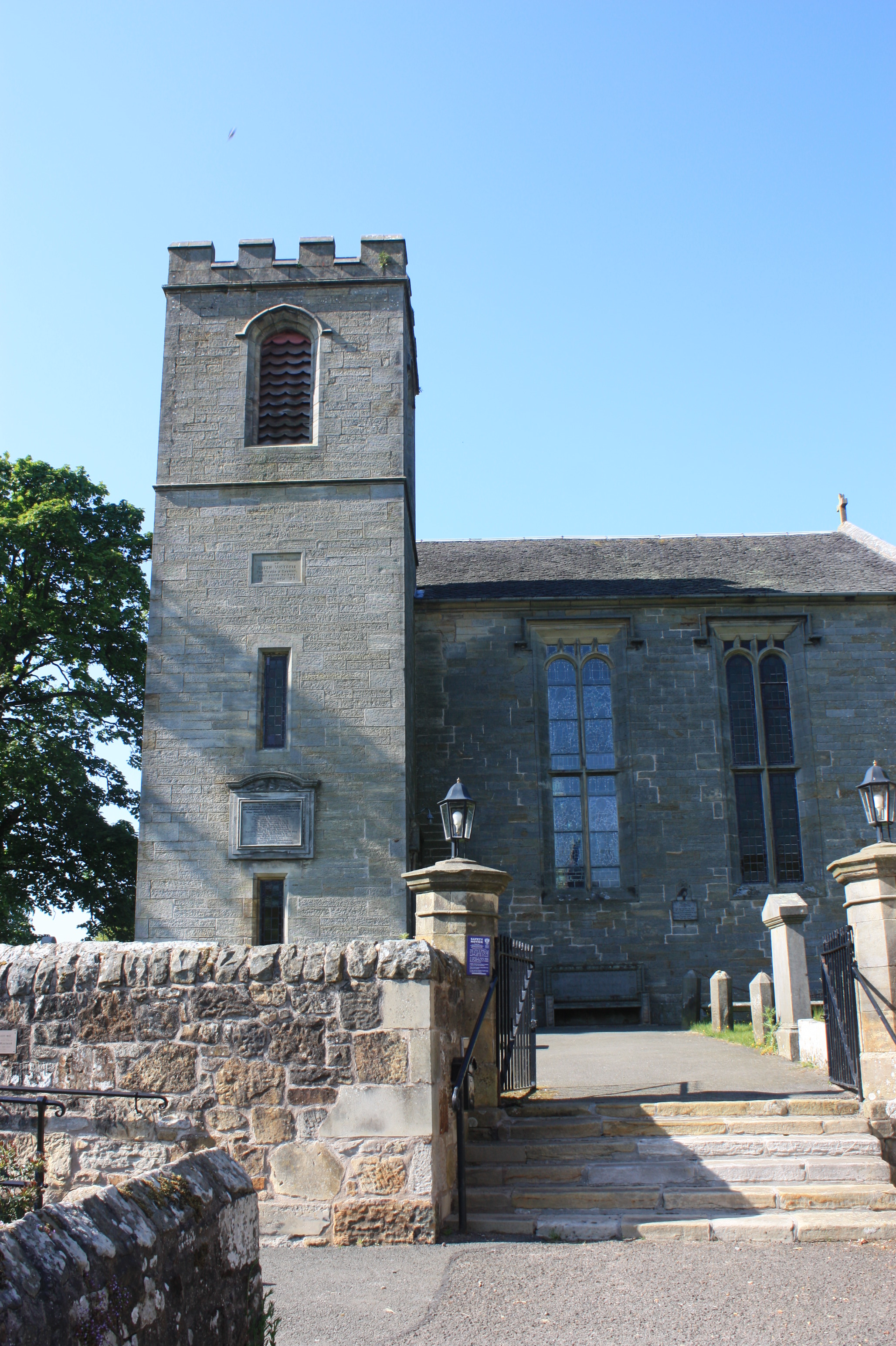
Cleish Parish Church

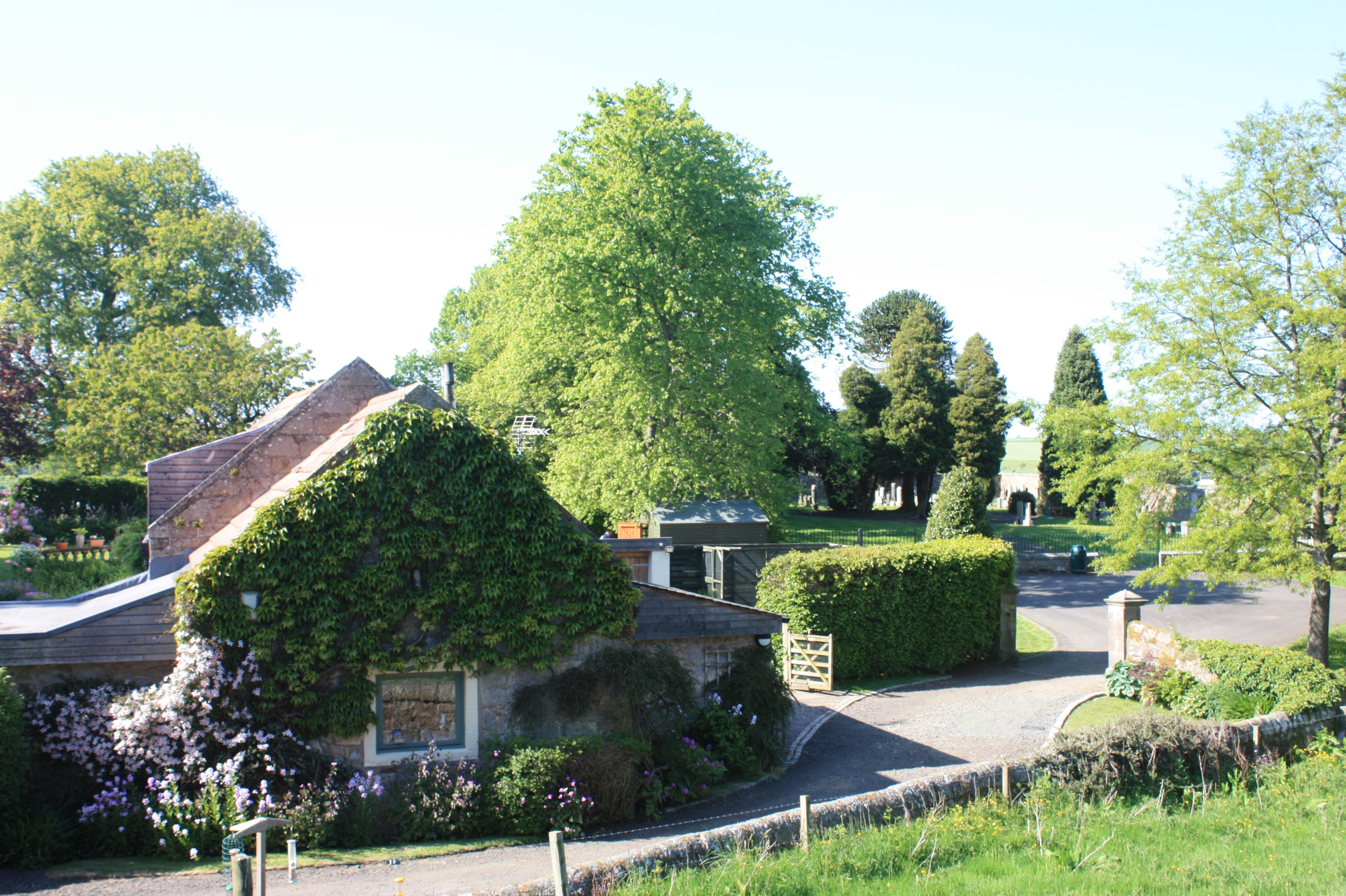
A typical house in Cleish with Cleish Cemetery beyond

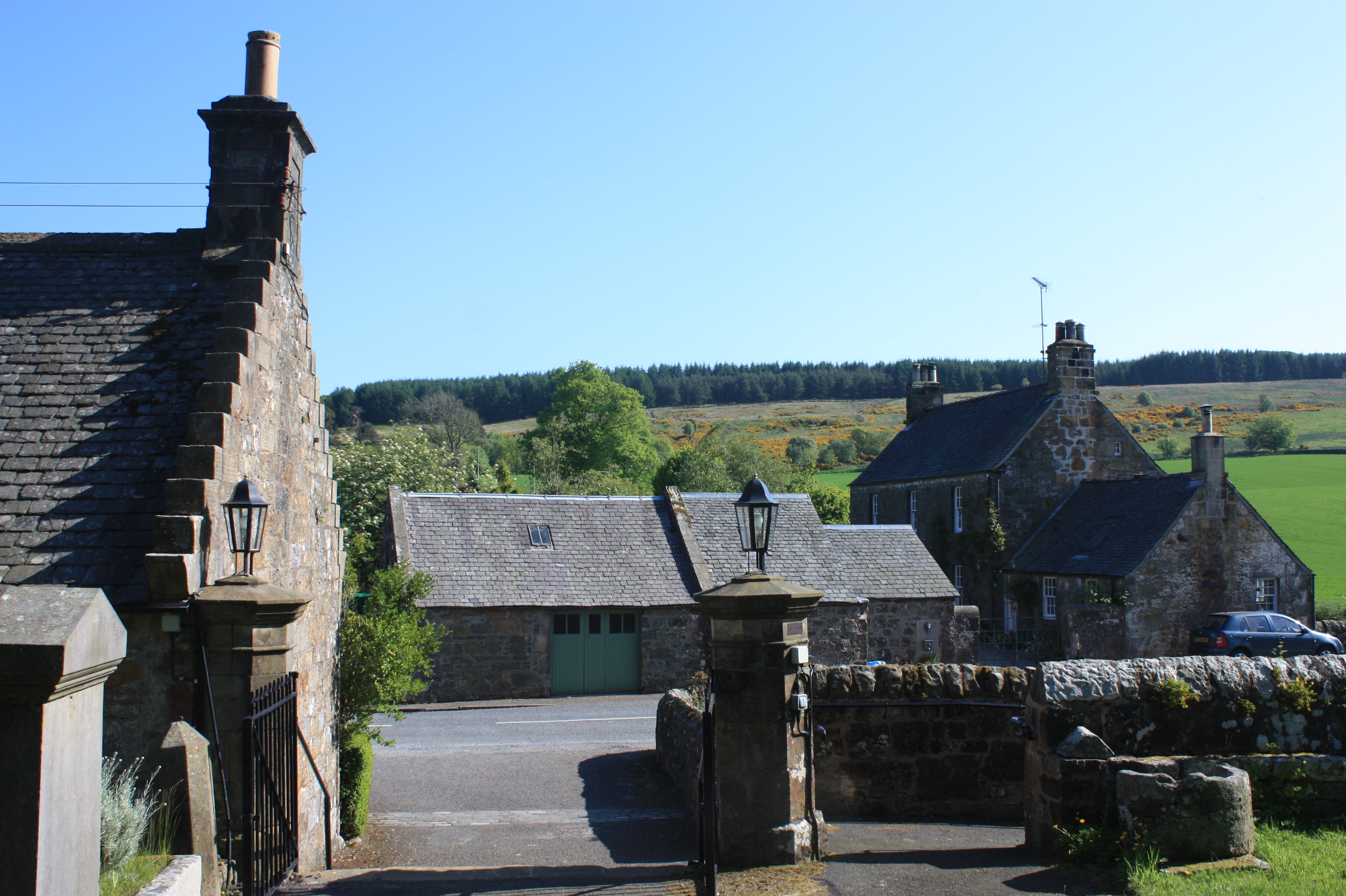
Houses in Cleish with the Cleish Hills behind

Cleish is a rural hamlet off the B9097 between Crook of Devon and the M90 motorway, three miles south-west of Kinross in central Scotland. It lies in the historic county of Kinross-shire.

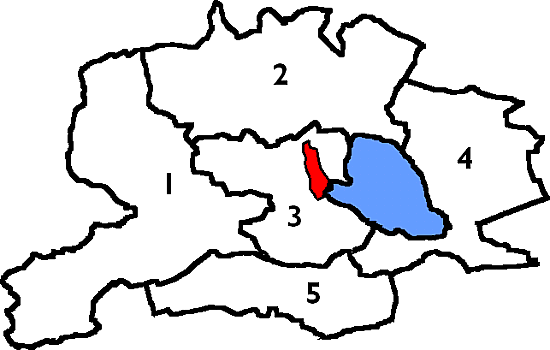
Parishes of Kinross-shire. Cleish is no. 5

At the last census (2011), the population of the civil parish was 685.

The village is mentioned in Sir Walter Scott's novel The Abbot. The majority of buildings date from the 18th century and the village retains much charm. The school dates from 1835.

It is a designated conservation area.

Cleish Castle lies to the west of the hamlet.

== Cleish Church ==
The church can trace its roots to the 13th century and was originally dedicated to St. Cuthbert.

The current church was built in 1775 by John Adam who lived nearby at Blair Adam. The church was again rebuilt following a fire in 1832 and the tower was added in 1897, nominally to mark Queen Victoria's diamond jubilee. It is a Category B listed building.

Thomas James was ordained here in 1691 but left in 1698 to be official chaplain to the ill-fated Darien Expedition to colonise Panama, all in the employ of the Company of Scotland. He died at sea on 23 October 1698 and was buried at sea en route to Darien.

John Gib, (not Adam Gib's father) was minister of Cleish from 1701 to 1741. His successor, Alexander Dalling, was minister from 1743 to 1790 and was succeeded by his son William Dalling who served until 1835 - a span of 92 years between father and son.

The minister 1836 to 1843 was the William Wallace Duncan (1808-1864) the son of Henry Duncan founder of the TSB. He left to serve in Peebles Free church and died there of smallpox. Duncan was replaced in 1843 by Charles Ross who resigned in 1893 and died in Wolverhampton in 1897.

== Notable Interments ==
- Lady Emily Jane Adam of Blair Adam (1833–1906)
- Robert Curror of Nivingston (1686–1768) and his son John Curror (1717–1809)
- Ebenezer Michie (died 1813), friend of Robert Burns
- Mary Lundie Duncan, author of the "Cleish Hymn", Jesus Tender Shepherd Hear Me (wife of Rev William Wallace Duncan)

== Nivingston House ==
Nivingston is of long-standing but the current Nivingston House dates from the late 19th century and operates as a country house hotel. It lies to the south-east of the village.

== Cleish Hills ==
The low rolling hills to the south extend to Dunfermline which are less dramatic than the Lomond Hills to their east. Several small lochs including Loch Glow and the Black Loch lie amongst the hills. Loch Fitty lies on the southern side of the hills. The highest point is Dumglow (379m). The hills are geologically complex consisting of a variety of sedimentary rocks of Carboniferous age within which are some volcanic rocks and into which other igneous rocks have been intruded. The sedimentary rocks are a collection of mudstones and sandstones and limestones assigned to the Strathclyde and Inverclyde groups. Two separate sills are identified; one forming a part of the Midland valley Sill-complex consisting of quartz-microgabbro and to the south, the Hawkcraig Point Sill of analcime-microgabbro, part of a wider Carboniferous to Permian set of intrusions. Knockhill Racing Circuit lies at the western end of the hills.
