= Kirkpatrick Durham =

Coordinates: 55°0′39.74″N 3°53′46.63″W

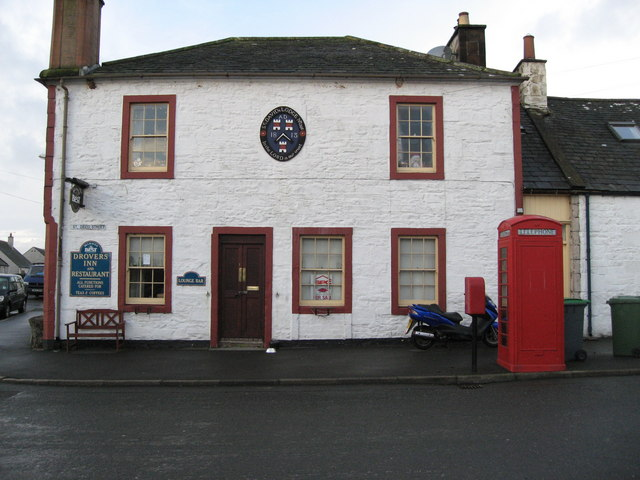
Drovers Inn, Kirkpatrick Durham

Kirkpatrick Durham (Scottish Gaelic: Cill Phàdraig) is a village and parish in the historical county of Kirkcudbrightshire, Dumfries and Galloway, south-west Scotland. It is located 6 miles (9.7 km) north of Castle Douglas.

== History ==
An old church dedicated to St Patrick gives the first element of the name: Kirk Patrick. The name Durham indicates barren land and distinguishes the village from another Kirkpatrick in the area.

The village lay in the parish of Kilpatrick and was developed from 1785 by Rev David Lamont on his own ground and named Kirkpatrick Durham operating as a handloom weaving centre.

A curling club was formed in the village in 1838.

The present church was built in 1850 by Dumfries-based architect Walter Newall.

== Notable residents ==
- William MacMorine born here in 1756. Served as Moderator of the General Assembly of the Church of Scotland in 1812.
- David Lamont was minister of the parish from 1774 to 1837 and served as Moderator of the General Assembly of the Church of Scotland in 1822.
- In the 19th century the minister was nominally George Duncan. Isabelle Wight Duncan was his wife and mother to nine of their children. In 1860 she published a book that went up against On the Origin of Species. Her book reconciled the emerging geological discoveries with the stories of Genesis.
- John Gerrond (1765-1832) the self-styled "Galloway Poet", was born at Gateside of Bar in Kirkpatrick Durham. His works include Poems on Several Occasions, Chiefly in the Scottish Dialect (1802), The Poetical and Prose Works of John Gerrond (1812), and The New Poetical Works of John Gerrond, the Galloway Poet (1818). He died in the cholera epidemic in Dumfries in 1832.
