= Matthias Bruen =

Rev Matthias Bruen
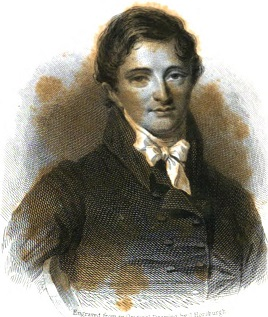
- Elected: Minister, Bleecker Street Presbyterian Church
- In office: June 14, 1825 to September 6, 1829
- Successor: Rev Erskine Mason

Orders
- Ordination: November 4, 1818 in London

Personal details
- Born: April 11, 1793
- Died: September 6, 1829 (aged 36)
- Education: Columbia College

Rev. Matthias Bruen (Newark, New Jersey April 11, 1793 - September 6, 1829) was a Presbyterian minister in New York City. Bruen was a founder of the Bleecker Street Presbyterian Church in lower Manhattan, formally chartered in 1825, and served as the first Minister of that church until his death. In the 1850s, the church moved to Fourth Avenue and 22nd Street, becoming the Fourth Avenue Presbyterian Church, in 1910 moving to become the Broadway Presbyterian Church.

== Early life ==
Matthias Bruen was born to Matthias Bruen Sr. and Hannah (Coe) Bruen into an established family of Newark, New Jersey. His direct ancestor, Obadiah Bruen, being one of the founders of that city. His father was a wealthy businessman who was thought at one point to be one of the richest men in New York.

== Studies ==
In his youth, Bruen had an unusual interest in books: starting as a six year old he would shut himself in a room to focus on his reading. In 1808 at age 15 he attended Columbia College and graduated from there in 1812 with high honors. It was at this point that he chose to pursue a religious life and enrolled in the Theological Seminary of the Associate Reformed Church under the direction of Dr John M. Mason, who was also the head of the seminary. In 1816 Bruen was licensed to preach by the Presbyterian Classis of New York.

Bruen was first troubled by a chronic illness by 1812. When later the opportunity to travel to Europe was presented to him he chose to go partly with the hope of a benefit to his health.

== Travels in Europe ==
In 1816 Bruen traveled to Europe with Mason and remained there for more than two years. Very soon after arriving in England the two men traveled to Scotland and spent time with a noted Presbyterian leader there. Bruen was introduced to Rev. Robert Lundie and his wife, Mary Grey Lundie, with whom he carried on a religious correspondence over several years. In 1831 it was Mary (now Mrs Duncan) who published a collection of Bruen's letters as a memorial to his life and service to the church.

== Ministry ==
Just before returning from Europe in 1818 Bruen received an invitation to officiate in the church of the Oratoire in Paris. After taking his ordination in London on November 4 he traveled to Paris and served there until May 1819 before resigning to return to America. He preached in several places before settling in Manhattan and applying to the Presbyterian Church of New York to serve as a missionary there in the vicinity of Bleecker Street in the fall of 1822.

== Family ==
Coat of Arms of Matthias Bruen

Bruen was married to Mary Anne Davenport on January 2, 1823. They had four children, two of whom died young. The two surviving daughters were Frances Davenport Bruen, born in 1825 and Mary Lundie Bruen who was born in 1828 and lived many years with her mother after Matthias's death. Frances married Charles Callahan Perkins on June 12, 1855, and they had three children.

== Death ==
On Sunday August 30, 1829, while opening the morning service, Bruen was attacked by a sudden illness which forced him to retire from the church. His condition worsened during the week and he died the following Sunday. On Monday, September 7, 1829, his remains were laid in the vault at the foot of the pulpit from which he had addressed the members of his congregation.

After Bruen's death, a large collection of his letters was published as a memorial to his life, first in the United States in 1831. and then a very similar volume was published Scotland in 1832.
