= John Grey (land agent) =

English Agriculturalist

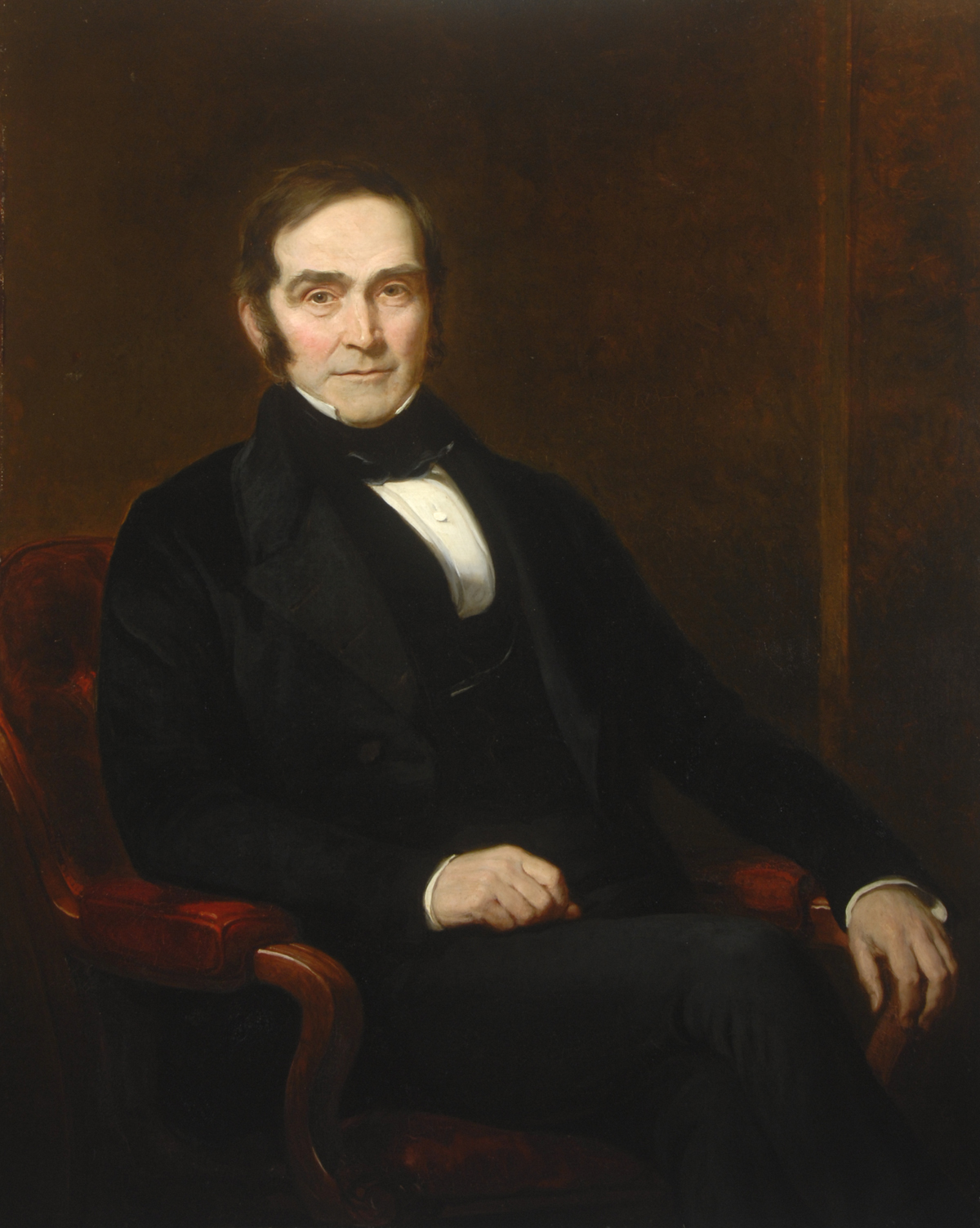
- John Grey, 1852 portrait by George Patten
- Born: August 1785; Millfield Hill, Glendale, Northumberland, England, Kingdom of Great Britain
- Died: January 22, 1868 (aged 82–83); River Tyne, England, United Kingdom of Great Britain and Ireland
- Resting place: England, United Kingdom
- Occupation: Land agent
- Spouse: Hannah Eliza
- Children: Josephine Butler
- Parent(s): George Grey; Mary Grey

John Grey (1785–1868), of Dilston, was an English land agent and agriculturist. He was the father of Josephine Butler, the feminist campaigner.

== Life ==
The eldest son of George Grey of West Ord, near Berwick-on-Tweed, who died in 1793, by Mary, daughter of John Burn of Berwick, he was born at Millfield Hill, Glendale, Northumberland, in August 1785, and was educated at Richmond grammar school. While still young he met Francis Jeffrey, Thomas Chalmers, Edward Irving, and Sir Walter Scott, and entered public life when seventeen years old.

The first public question that Grey took part in was the abolition of slavery. He was entrusted by Thomas Clarkson in 1823 with the task of collecting petitions in some of the towns of the Borders. He accompanied Lord Brougham in his abolitionist tour in Northumberland and Cumberland in 1826, and seconded him with speeches. He took part in the agitation for Catholic Emancipation, and in the struggle which preceded the Reform Bill of 1832. He enjoyed the confidence of Earl Grey and Lord Althorp (Lord Spencer), and spoke on the hustings at Alnwick.

In 1833 Sir James Graham placed under Grey's sole management the northern estates belonging to Greenwich Hospital in Northumberland and Cumberland. Grey then ceased to take an active part in politics; but was consulted on some measures, such as the Tithe Commutation Act, the land drainage scheme, and free trade. From early years (1803) he had concentrated on agricultural improvement. He had originally farmed in north Northumberland, where, with others, he created a new system of agriculture, both in breeding cattle and cultivating the land.

In the administration of the agricultural and mining estates of Greenwich Hospital, Grey was raised the net rental of the property in twenty years from £30,000 to £40,000. He was visited by foreigners, and Baron Liebig saw on visiting Dilston his own discoveries applied to the improvement of the Northumbrian crops. Grey's management was denounced in some newspapers. In the autumn of 1857 he lost the greater part of his savings by the failure of the Newcastle bank.

Grey retired from the management of the Greenwich Hospital estates in 1863, aged 77. He moved to Lipwood House on the banks of the River Tyne, near Haydon Bridge, where he died on 22 January 1868.

== Family ==
Grey married, in 1815, Hannah Eliza, daughter of Ralph Annette of The Fence, near Alnwick, by whom he had a family of three sons and seven daughters, who included Josephine Butler. Hannah Grey died at Dilston on 15 May 1860. Charles Grey succeeded to his father's position in the management of the Greenwich Hospital estates. His niece was the hymnwriter, Jane Lundie Bonar.

== Notes ==
Attribution

This article incorporates text from a publication now in the public domain: Stephen, Leslie; Lee, Sidney, eds. (1890). "Grey, John (1785-1868)". Dictionary of National Biography. Vol. 23. London: Smith, Elder & Co.
